= Tue Rechnung! Donnerwort, BWV 168 =

Church cantata by Johann Sebastian Bach

Tue Rechnung! Donnerwort
- BWV 168
- Church cantata by J. S. Bach
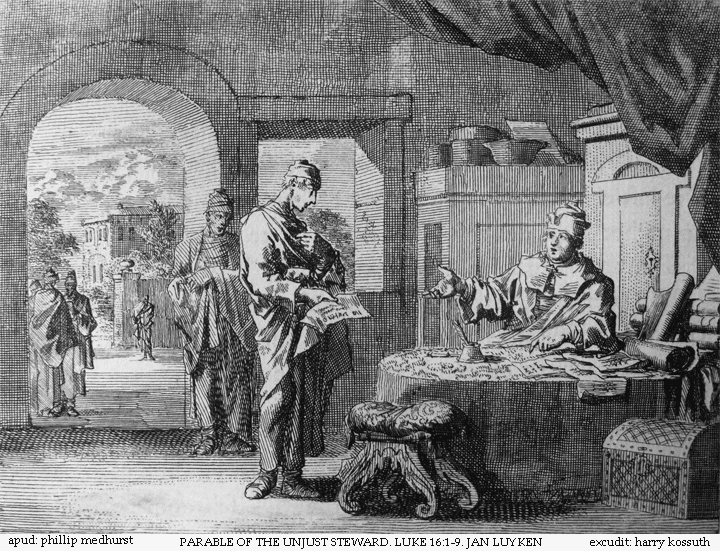
- Parable of the Unjust Steward
- Occasion: Ninth Sunday after Trinity
- Cantata text: Salomon Franck
- Chorale: "Herr Jesu Christ, du höchstes Gut" by Bartholomäus Ringwaldt
- Performed: 29 July 1725: Leipzig
- Movements: 6
- Vocal: SATB solo and choir
- Instrumental: 2 oboes d'amore; 2 violins; viola; continuo

Johann Sebastian Bach composed the church cantata Tue Rechnung! Donnerwort (Settle account! Word of thunder), BWV 168 in Leipzig for the ninth Sunday after Trinity and first performed it on 29 July 1725.

Bach set a text by Salomo Franck, a librettist with whom he had worked in Weimar. The text, which Franck had published in 1715, uses the prescribed reading from the Gospel of Luke, the parable of the Unjust Steward, as a starting point for thoughts about the debt of sin and its "payment", using monetary terms. He concluded the text with a stanza from Bartholomäus Ringwaldt's hymn "Herr Jesu Christ, du höchstes Gut". Bach structured the cantata in six movements and scored it intimately, as he did for many of Franck's works, for four vocal parts, combined only in the chorale, two oboes d'amore, strings and basso continuo. It is the first new composition in his third year as Thomaskantor in Leipzig.

== History and words ==
Bach composed the cantata in Leipzig for the Ninth Sunday after Trinity as the first cantata of his third cantata cycle, being the first new composition in his third year as Thomaskantor in Leipzig. The libretto is by Salomon Franck who was a court poet in Weimar. Bach had often set Franck's texts when he was Konzertmeister (concertmaster) there from 1714 to 1717. Franck published the text of Tue Rechnung! Donnerwort in 1715 as part of the collection Evangelisches Andachts-Opffer, and Bach would probably have used at the time had it not been for a period of mourning for Prince Johann Ernst of Saxe-Weimar.

The prescribed readings for the Sunday were from the First Epistle to the Corithians, a warning of false gods and consolation in temptation (1 Corinthians 10:6–13), and from the Gospel of Luke, the parable of the Unjust Steward (Luke 16:1–9). Franck's text is closely related to the Gospel, beginning with a paraphrase of verse 2 in the opening aria. The situation of the unjust servant is generalized; he is seen wanting mountains and hills to fall on his back, as mentioned in Luke 23:30. Franck uses explicit monetary terms to speak about the debt, such as "Kapital und Interessen" (capital and interest). A turning point is reached in the fourth movement, referring to the death of Jesus which "crossed out the debt". The cantata is concluded by the eighth stanza of Bartholomäus Ringwaldt's hymn "Herr Jesu Christ, du höchstes Gut" (1588). Bach had treated the complete chorale a year before in his chorale cantata Herr Jesu Christ, du höchstes Gut, BWV 113, for the eleventh Sunday after Trinity.

Bach first performed the cantata on 29 July 1725. The cantata was first published in 1887 in a volume edited by Franz Wüllner, part of the first complete edition of the works of Bach, Joh. Seb. Bach's Werke. Besides Bach's autograph score, there are original performing parts copied by Bach's circle.

== Music ==
=== Structure and scoring ===
Bach structured the cantata in six movements and scored it intimately, as he did for many of Franck's works. The singers consist of four vocal soloists (soprano (S), alto (A), tenor (T), and bass) (B) plus a four-part choir only in the chorale. The instrumental parts are for two oboes d'amore (Oa), two violins (Vl), viola (Va) and basso continuo (Bc). The title of the autograph score reads: "9 post Trinit. / Thue Rechnung! Donner Wort / a / 4 Voci / 2 Hautb. d'Amour / 2 Violini / Viola / e / Continuo / di / J.S.Bach". The duration is given as 17 minutes.

In the following table of the movements, the scoring and keys and time signatures are taken from Alfred Dürr, using the symbol for common time (4/4). The instruments are shown separately for winds and strings, while the continuo, playing throughout, is not shown.

Movements of Tue Rechnung! Donnerwort
No.	Title	Text	Type	Vocal	Winds	Strings	Key	Time
1	Tue Rechnung! Donnerwort	Franck	Aria	B		2Vl Va	B minor	common time
2	Es ist nur fremdes Gut	Franck	Recitative	T	2Oa			common time
3	Kapital und Interessen	Franck	Aria	T	2Oa (unis.)		F-sharp minor	3/8
4	Jedoch, erschrocknes Herz, leb und verzage nicht	Franck	Recitative	B				common time
5	Herz, zerreiß des Mammons Kette	Franck	Aria	S A			E minor	6/8
6	Stärk mich mit deinem Freudengeist	Ringwaldt	Chorale	SATB	2Oa	2Vl Va	B minor	common time

=== Movements ===
==== 1 ====
The work opens with a bass aria, accompanied by the strings, "Tue Rechnung! Donnerwort" (Settle account! Word of thunder). Christoph Wolff notes:

Bach translates Franck's baroque poetry into an extraordinarily gripping musical form. The virtuoso string writing in the opening aria prepares and then underscores the emphatically articulated "word of thunder, that can shatter even the rocks" ("Donnerwort, das die Felsen selbst zerspaltet"), and which causes the blood to "run cold" ("Blut erkaltet").

==== 2 ====
The recitative, "Es ist nur fremdes Gut" (It is only an alien good) is the first movement with the full orchestra. The oboes first play long chords, but finally illustrate the text figuratively, speaking of toppling mountains and "the flash of His countenance". The musicologist Julian Mincham notes that Bach's recitative is "both melodic and dramatic throughout", showing his familiarity with "the best contemporary operatic styles".

==== 3 ====
A tenor aria with the oboes in unison develops "Kapital und Interessen" (Capital and interest). Klaus Hofmann calls the movement dance-like.

==== 4 ====
A secco recitative for bass demands: "Jedoch, erschrocknes Herz, leb und verzage nicht!" (Nevertheless, terrified heart, live and do not despair!).

==== 5 ====
A duet of the upper voices, only accompanied by the continuo, reflects "Herz, zerreiß des Mammons Kette" (Heart, rend the chains of Mammon). Hofmann notes the dotted rhythm of the dance Canarie to the often canonic imitation of the voices. The word "zerreiß" (tear asunder) is depicted by a rest afterwards. The fetters (Kette) are illustrated with "slurred coloraturas", the term "Sterbebett" (deathbed) appears in "darkening of the harmony."

==== 6 ====
The closing chorale, "Stärk mich mit deinem Freudengeist" (Strengthen me with Your joyful Spirit), is a four-part setting.

== Recordings ==
The listing is taken from the selection on the Bach Cantatas Website. Ensembles playing period instruments in historically informed performance are marked by green background.

Recordings of Tue Rechnung! Donnerwort
Title	Conductor / Choir / Orchestra	Soloists	Label	Year	Orch. type
Die Bach Kantate Vol. 45	Helmuth Rilling Gächinger Kantorei Bach-Collegium Stuttgart	Nancy Burns; Verena Gohl; Theo Altmeyer; Siegmund Nimsgern	Hänssler	1970	
J. S. Bach: Das Kantatenwerk · Complete Cantatas · Les Cantates, Folge / Vol. 39 – BWV 164–169	Nikolaus Harnoncourt Tölzer Knabenchor Leonhardt-Consort	soloists of the Tölzer Knabenchor; Kurt Equiluz; Robert Holl	Telefunken	1987	Period
Bach Edition Vol. 8 – Cantatas Vol. 3	Pieter Jan Leusink Holland Boys Choir Netherlands Bach Collegium	Ruth Holton; Sytse Buwalda; Knut Schoch; Bas Ramselaar	Brilliant Classics	1999	Period
J. S. Bach: Trinity Cantatas I	John Eliot Gardiner Monteverdi Choir English Baroque Soloists	Katharine Fuge; Daniel Taylor; James Gilchrist; Peter Harvey	Archiv Produktion	2000	Period
J. S. Bach: Complete Cantatas Vol. 15	Ton Koopman Amsterdam Baroque Choir Amsterdam Baroque Orchestra	Johannette Zomer; Bogna Bartosz; Christoph Prégardien; Klaus Mertens	Antoine Marchand	2002	Period
J. S. Bach: Cantatas Vol. 40 – Cantatas from Leipzig 1724 - BWV 79, 137, 164, 168	Masaaki Suzuki Bach Collegium Japan	Yukari Nonoshita, Robin Blaze; Makoto Sakurada; Peter Kooy	BIS	2007	Period
