= Aus der Tiefen rufe ich, Herr, zu dir, BWV 131 =

Church cantata by Johann Sebastian Bach (c. 1707)

Aus der Tiefen rufe ich, Herr, zu dir
- BWV 131
- Church cantata by J. S. Bach
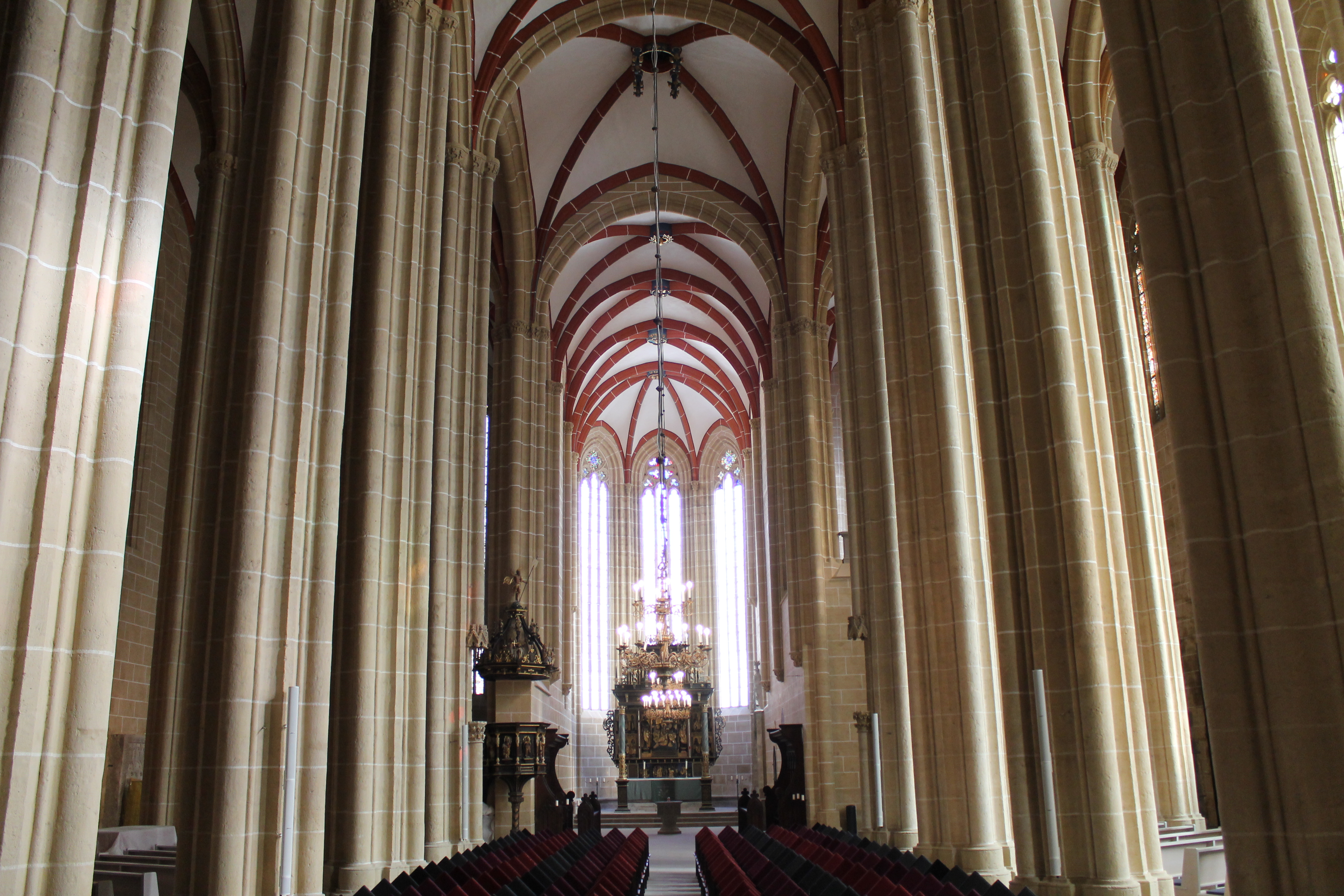
- The Marienkirche, Mühlhausen, whose minister commissioned the cantata
- Bible text: Psalms 130
- Chorale: "Herr Jesu Christ, du höchstes Gut" by Bartholomäus Ringwaldt
- Composed: 1707?: Mühlhausen
- Movements: 5
- Vocal: SATB choir; tenor and bass solo
- Instrumental: oboe; bassoon; violin; 2 violas; continuo

Aus der Tiefen rufe ich, Herr, zu dir (Out of the depths I call, Lord, to You), BWV 131, (Note: "BWV" is Bach-Werke-Verzeichnis, a thematic catalogue of Bach's works.) is a church cantata by the German composer Johann Sebastian Bach. It was composed in either 1707 or 1708, which makes it one of Bach's earliest cantatas. Some sources suggest that it could be his earliest surviving work in this form, but current thinking is that there are one or two earlier examples.

The cantata was commissioned by the minister of one of the churches in Mühlhausen, the city where Bach worked at the time. It was possibly written for a special occasion. The text is based on Luther's German version of Psalm 130 and also incorporates the words of a chorale. Bach's music integrates melodies from the chorale into larger structures. Bach also shows his interest in counterpoint, something which was characteristic of him throughout his career.

== History and words ==
A note on the autograph score of the cantata indicates that the work was commissioned by Georg Christian Eilmar, minister of the Marienkirche (St. Mary's church) in Mühlhausen. This allows the work to be dated to 1707–08, which is the period when Bach was living in Mühlhausen. Bach was employed as organist at the city's other main church, Divi Blasii,. He was also involved to some extent with performances at the Marienkirche, where civic ceremonies were held. One service there which Bach would have attended was that for the city council's inauguration in 1708 during which his cantata Gott ist mein Konig, BWV 71 had its premiere. He may have had a closer personal relationship with Eilmar than with the minister of his own church. Eilmar was godfather to his daughter Catharina Dorothea (born 1708).

Aus der Tiefen rufe ich, Herr, zu dir has been described as possibly Bach's first surviving cantata. For it to be the first, it has to be assumed not only that it predates other cantatas written in Mühlhausen (we know that he wrote at least one other there), but also that there is not a surviving cantata from his previous post at Arnstadt. It seems likely that Bach was composing choral music at Arnstadt. Although Bach was only 22 when he took up the appointment at Mühlhausen, the performance of a work of his own composition appears to have been part of the selection process. Recent scholarship suggests that another surviving cantata Nach dir, Herr, verlanget mich, BWV 150 could have been composed at Arnstadt.

The libretto is based on Psalm 130, one of the penitential psalms. The incipit of the psalm, "Aus der Tiefen rufe ich, Herr, zu dir", gives the cantata its name. Originally a Hebrew text, the incipit has variants in translation. While Psalms 130:1–6 is rendered "Out of the depths..." in the English King James Version, a closer translation of the German text used by Bach would be "deep" rather than "depths". The anonymous librettist, possibly Eilmar, includes in two of the movements verses from "Herr Jesu Christ, du höchstes Gut", a Lutheran hymn by Bartholomäus Ringwaldt. The hymn is also penitential. Bach later used it as the basis for the cantata Herr Jesu Christ, du höchstes Gut, BWV 113, where the words form a counterpart to the tax collector's prayer in the parable of the Pharisee and the Publican, the gospel reading for the eleventh Sunday after Trinity.

In his Bach Cantata Pilgrimage, Sir John Eliot Gardiner performed and recorded the work with cantatas for the Fifth Sunday after Trinity, but it is not known for sure when in the liturgical year Bach performed it, and there has been speculation that it was written for a special occasion.

=== Publication ===
Bach's ability as a composer was recognised by the city council of Muhlhausen who paid for the printing of the cantata Gott ist mein Konig, BWV 71. They may also have arranged the publication of a later cantata now lost. None of the other cantatas was published in the composer's lifetime. Aus der Tiefen rufe ich, Herr, zu dir was first published in 1881 as part of the Bach-Gesellschaft-Ausgabe, the first complete edition of Bach's works. The editor was Wilhelm Rust, who edited many volumes for the Bach-Gesellschaft. At the time of publication of this volume, he held the position of Thomaskantor in Leipzig.

== Scoring and structure ==
=== Singers ===
Bach scored the work for tenor and bass soloists and a four-part choir. Bach gives his soloists an arioso and an aria. As in other early cantatas, there are no recitatives. (Bach later came more under the influence of Italian music, combining recitatives and arias).

Bach did not give a direct indication of how many singers he envisaged in the choir. The cantata can be performed with only four singers, as in the recording by Joshua Rifkin, who is well known in the world of Bach performance for his "one voice to a part" approach. However, most recordings feature a choir with multiple voices to a part. Another choice to be made is whether to use women singers: Bach's original singers were probably all male. Most recordings of the cantata, however, feature mixed choirs: an exception is the version conducted by Nikolaus Harnoncourt, which deploys boys' voices as the top lines of the choir.

=== Instruments ===
The singers are accompanied by an instrumental group consisting of oboe, bassoon, violin, two violas and basso continuo. As in the case of the singers, the question arises as to whether Bach used one or more players per part. The oboe and the violin are given some important solos, suggesting that there may well have been only one of each. Ton Koopman, for example, uses one oboist and one violinist in his recording. The role of the violas is more to provide accompaniment, filling in harmonies and sometimes doubling vocal lines. The bassoon sometimes supports the continuo section, doubling its bass line, and sometimes plays an independent line.

=== Musical forms ===
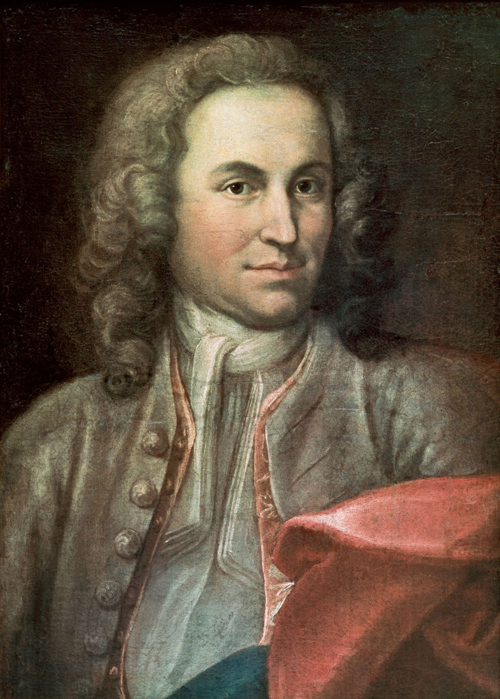
Portrait of the young Bach (disputed)

Bach used some musical forms which reappear in later cantatas. For example, two of the choral movements have a fugue, a style of composition in which Bach excelled. Also, the two movements for soloists are developed as a type of chorale fantasia with the soloist singing the psalm text and an upper voice singing the chorale in long notes as a cantus firmus. Craig Smith called the chorale settings "a window on the future". However, he criticised the structure of the cantata, saying that it offers evidence that at this stage in his career the composer had difficulty with large forms. On the other hand, the musicologist Julian Mincham regards the piece as being different from later cantatas rather than inferior to them.

=== Structure and scoring ===
Bach structured the cantata in five movements, three choral movements interspersed by an arioso and an aria. In both solo movements, a chorale stanza sung simultaneously by the soprano intensifies the Psalm text. He scored it for two soloist (tenor and bass), a four-part choir, and a small Baroque instrumental ensemble of oboe (Ob), bassoon (Fg), violin (Vl), two violas (Va), and basso continuo.

In the following table of the movements, the scoring follows the New Bach Edition (Neue Bach-Ausgabe). The keys and time signatures are taken from Alfred Dürr, using the symbol for common time (4/4). The continuo, playing throughout, is not shown.

Movements of Aus der Tiefen rufe ich, Herr, zu dir, BWV 131
No.	Title	Text	Type	Vocal	Winds	Strings	Key	Time
1	Aus der Tiefen rufe ich, Herr, zu dir	Ps. 130:1–2	Chorus	SATB	Ob Fg	Vl 2Va	G minor	3/4
2	So du willst, Herr, Sünde zurechnen	Ps. 130:3–4; Ringwaldt	Arioso e chorale	B; S	Ob		G minor	common time
3	Ich harre des Herrn, meine Seele harret	Ps. 130:5	Chorus	SATB	Ob Fg	Vl 2Va	E♭ major; G minor	common time
4	Meine Seele wartet auf den Herrn von einer Morgenwache	Ps. 130:6; Ringwaldt	Aria e chorale	T; A			C minor	12/8
5	Israel hoffe auf den Herrn; denn bei dem Herrn	Ps. 130:7–8	Chorus	SATB	Ob Fg	Vl 2Va	G minor	common time

== Recordings ==
The following entries are taken from the listing on the Bach Cantatas Website. Choirs with one voice per part (OVPP) and ensembles playing period instruments in historically informed performances are marked by green background.

Recordings of Aus der Tiefen rufe ich, Herr, zu dir, BWV 131
Title	Conductor / Choir / Orchestra	Soloists	Label	Year	Choir type	Instr.
J. S. Bach: Cantatas BWV 131 & BWV 140	Robert Shaw Robert Shaw Chorale RCA Victor Orchestra	William Hess; Paul Matthen	RCA	1949		
Bach Made in Germany Vol. 1 – Cantatas IX	Günther Ramin Thomanerchor Gewandhausorchester	Gert Lutze; Johannes Oettel	Eterna	1952		
Les Grandes Cantates de J. S. Bach Vol. 17	Fritz Werner Heinrich-Schütz-Chor Heilbronn Pforzheim Chamber Orchestra	Georg Jelden; Jakob Stämpfli	Erato	1964		
J. S. Bach: Cantatas BWV 93 & BWV 131	Hans Thamm Windsbacher Knabenchor Das Corsortium Musicum	Teresa Żylis-Gara; Ingeborg Ruß; Peter Schreier; Franz Crass	EMI	1966		
Die Bach Kantate Vol. 15	Helmuth Rilling Gächinger Kantorei Bach-Collegium Stuttgart	Adalbert Kraus; Wolfgang Schöne	Hänssler	1975		
J. S. Bach: Das Kantatenwerk • Complete Cantatas • Les Cantates, Folge / Vol. 32	Nikolaus Harnoncourt Tölzer Knabenchor Concentus Musicus Wien	soloist of the Tölzer Knabenchor; Paul Esswood; Kurt Equiluz; Robert Holl	Teldec	1981		Period
Bach: Actus Tragicus – Cantatas 106, 131, 99, 56, 82 & 158	Joshua Rifkin The Bach Ensemble	Jan Opalach; Edmund Brownless	Decca	1985	OVPP	Period
J. S. Bach: Kantaten BWV 131, 73 & 105	Philippe Herreweghe Collegium Vocale Gent	Howard Crook; Peter Kooy	Harmonia Mundi France	1990		Period
Deutsche Barock Kantaten (VIII): Aus der Tiefe	Erik Van Nevel Ricercar Consort	Greta De Reyghere; James Bowman; Guy de Mey; Max van Egmond	Ricercar	1991	OVPP	Period
J. S. Bach: Cantatas Vol. 2 – (BWV 71, 106, 131)	Masaaki Suzuki Bach Collegium Japan	Midori Suzuki; Yoshikazu Mera; Gerd Türk; Peter Kooy	BIS	1995		Period
J. S. Bach: Complete Cantatas Vol. 1	Ton Koopman Amsterdam Baroque Orchestra & Choir	Barbara Schlick; Kai Wessel; Guy de Mey; Klaus Mertens	Antoine Marchand	1997		Period
Bach Edition Vol. 20 – Cantatas Vol. 11	Pieter Jan Leusink Holland Boys Choir Netherlands Bach Collegium	Ruth Holton; Sytse Buwalda; Nico van der Meel; Bas Ramselaar	Brilliant Classics	2000		Period
Bach Cantatas Vol. 3: Tewkesbury/Mühlhausen	John Eliot Gardiner Monteverdi Choir English Baroque Soloists	Lisa Larsson, Daniel Taylor, James Gilchrist; Stephen Varcoe	Soli Deo Gloria	2000		Period
Bach – Purcell: Motetten – Kantaten	Thomas Hengelbrock Balthasar-Neumann-Chor & Ensemble	Hans Jörg Mammel; Marek Rzepka	Deutsche Harmonia Mundi	2007		Period

== See also ==
- The Fugue in G minor, BWV 131a is a transcription for organ of the fugue from the closing movement of the cantata. Although the work has a BWV number, it is not certain that the arranger was Bach.

== Bibliography ==
- Dürr, Alfred (2006). The Cantatas of J. S. Bach: With Their Librettos in German-English Parallel Text. Translated by Richard D. P. Jones. Oxford University Press. ISBN 0-19-929776-2.
- Geck, Martin (2006). Johann Sebastian Bach: Life and Work. Translated by John Hargraves. Harcourt. ISBN 978-0-15-100648-9.
- Wolff, Christoph (2002). Johann Sebastian Bach: The Learned Musician. Oxford University Press. ISBN 978-0-393-32256-9.
