= Wer da gläubet und getauft wird, BWV 37 =

Church cantata by Johann Sebastian Bach

Wer da gläubet und getauft wird
- BWV 37
- Church cantata by J. S. Bach
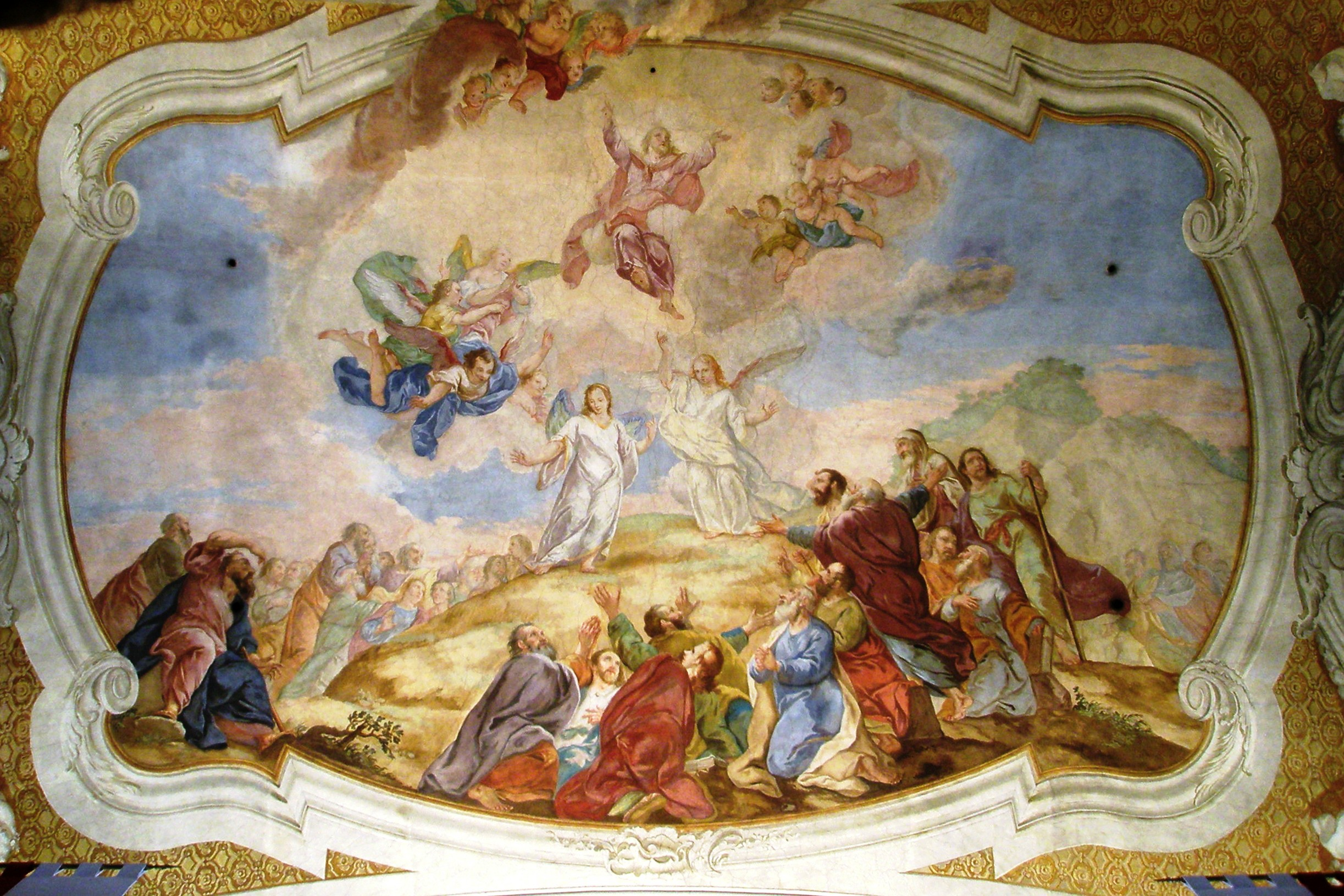
- Ascension, Church of the Holy Cross in Jelenia Góra
- Occasion: Feast of the Ascension
- Bible text: Mark 16:16
- Chorale: Nicolai's "Wie schön leuchtet der Morgenstern"; Johannes Kolrose's "Ich dank dir, lieber Herre"
- Performed: 18 May 1724: Leipzig
- Movements: 6
- Vocal: SATB choir and solo
- Instrumental: 2 oboes d'amore; 2 violins; viola; continuo

Wer da gläubet und getauft wird (He who believes and is baptised), BWV 37, (Note: "BWV" is Bach-Werke-Verzeichnis, a thematic catalogue of Bach's works.) is a cantata by Johann Sebastian Bach, a church cantata for the feast of the Ascension of Jesus. Bach composed it in Leipzig and first performed it on 18 May 1724.

The work is Bach's first cantata composition for the feast of the Ascension. Surprisingly for a high feast day, it is modestly scored; only two oboes d'amore add to the sound of the regular strings and basso continuo, accompanying four vocal parts. An anonymous poet derived thoughts from the prescribed Gospel, even quoting a verse, but excluded the Ascension itself and concentrated on the Lutheran idea of justification by faith alone. The poet structured the six movements of the cantata in two parts, each concluded by a chorale.

== History and words ==
Bach composed the cantata in Leipzig for Ascension. The prescribed readings for the feast day were from the Acts of the Apostles, the prologue and Ascension (Acts 1:1–11), and from the Gospel of Mark, Jesus telling his disciples to preach and baptize, and his Ascension (Mark 16:14–20).

An unknown poet began with the quotation of verse 16 from the Gospel. Werner Neumann suggests that Christian Weiss may be this anonymous poet. Klaus Hofmann notes that the pattern of the text is the same as in Wo gehest du hin? BWV 166, and Wahrlich, wahrlich, ich sage euch, BWV 86, performed the two previous Sundays. While the Gospel contains both the request to preach and baptise, and the ascension, the cantata text excludes the ascension and concentrates on the justification of the baptised Christian by faith. The cantata is short, but nonetheless in two parts, each closed by a chorale, the fifth stanza of Philipp Nicolai's hymn "Wie schön leuchtet der Morgenstern" (1599) as movement 3 and for the closing chorale the fourth stanza of the hymn "Ich dank dir, lieber Herre" (c. 1535) by Johannes Kolrose. Part I (movements 1 through 3) reflects the love of Jesus, with the chorale expressing thanks for it. Part II (movements 4 through 6) argues like a sermon, reminiscent of Paul's teaching in Romans 3:28, that good works alone are not enough for a blessed life if they are not founded in faith. The closing chorale is another song of thanks.

Bach first performed the cantata on 18 May 1724, and again on 3 May 1731. It was his first composition for the feast of the Ascension.

== Scoring and structure ==
The cantata in six movements is scored rather modestly: the four vocal soloists (soprano, alto, tenor and bass) and a four-part choir are accompanied only by two oboes d'amore, two violins, viola and basso continuo. Bach's cantatas for the occasion in later years, Auf Christi Himmelfahrt allein, BWV 128, and Gott fähret auf mit Jauchzen, BWV 43, and his Ascension Oratorio use a more festive orchestra including horns or trumpets.

Movements of Wer da gläubet und getauft wird, BWV 37
No.	Title	Type	Vocal	Winds	Strings	Key	Time
1	Wer da gläubet und getauft wird	Chorus	SATB	2ObDa	2Vl Va Bc	A major	3/2
2	Der Glaube ist das Pfand der Liebe	Aria	Tenor		(Vl) Bc	A major	common time
3	Herr Gott Vater, mein starker Held	Choral	Soprano, alto		Bc	D major	12/8
4	Ihr Sterblichen, verlanget ihr	Recitative	Bass		2Vl, Va, Bc		common time
5	Der Glaube schafft der Seele Flügel	Aria	Bass	1ObDa	2Vl, Va, Bc	B minor	common time
6	Den Glauben mir verleihe	Chorale	SATB	1ObDa (col Soprano), 1ObDa (coll'Alto)	1Vl (col Soprano), 1Vl (coll'Alto), Va (col Tenore), Bc	A major	common time

== Music ==
Although the text for the first movement is a quotation of Jesus, it is not given to the bass as the vox Christi but to the choir. John Eliot Gardiner notes that Bach treats it as a "statement by the faithful, as though to demonstrate that they had already absorbed its message to 'go into all the world, and preach the gospel to every creature". The movement begins with an extended instrumental Sinfonia which introduces three melodic lines that occur simultaneously. The first motif is played by the oboes and later taken by the choir, According to Gardiner, it suggests "steadfastness of faith". The second motif in the violins is reminiscent of Luther's hymn "Dies sind die heiligen zehn Gebot" (These are the holy Ten Commandments), which opened two other cantatas. Gardiner describes it as "emollient and graceful, a halfway house between a minuet and a waltz, affirming a more serene side to faith." The third motif is part of the hymn "Wie schön leuchtet der Morgenstern" and appears in the continuo. In two vocal sections, the voices are embedded in a repetition of the Sinfonia.

Movement 2 is an aria with a solo violin part missing, as the Neue Bach-Ausgabe reported. Reconstructions have been made, and are often included in performances. In movement 3, the chorale appears in the form of a chorale concerto, an Italianate form that Johann Hermann Schein had used a century earlier. The chorale melody is changed according to the meaning of the words; only the continuo accompanies two voices. The following recitative is accompanied by the strings. They appear also in the last aria, in which an oboe comes and goes, with interesting effects. The closing chorale is a four-part setting.

== Recordings ==
- J. S. Bach: Cantatas BWV 37, BWV 76, Wilhelm Ehmann, Westfälische Kantorei, Deutsche Bachsolisten, Nelly van der Spek, Frauke Haasemann, Johannes Hoefflin, Wilhelm Pommerien, Cantate 1965
- J. S. Bach: Das Kantatenwerk (2), Hans Grischkat, Schwäbischer Singkreis Stuttgart, Bach-Orchester Stuttgart, Csilla Zentai, Elisabeth Wacker, Kurt Huber, Michael Schopper, FSM Candide 1972
- J. S. Bach: Das Kantatenwerk – Sacred Cantatas Vol. 3, Nikolaus Harnoncourt, Wiener Sängerknaben, Chorus Viennensis, soloist of the Wiener Sängerknaben, Chorus Viennensis, Paul Esswood, Kurt Equiluz, Ruud van der Meer, Teldec 1974
- J. S. Bach: Ascension Cantatas, John Eliot Gardiner, Nancy Argenta, Monteverdi Choir, English Baroque Soloists, Michael Chance, Anthony Rolfe Johnson, Stephen Varcoe, Archiv Produktion 1996
- J. S. Bach: Complete Cantatas Vol. 9, Ton Koopman, Amsterdam Baroque Orchestra & Choir, Sibylla Rubens, Bernhard Landauer, Christoph Prégardien, Klaus Mertens, Antoine Marchand 1998
- Bach Edition Vol. 4 – Cantatas Vol. 1, Pieter Jan Leusink, Holland Boys Choir, Netherlands Bach Collegium, Ruth Holton, Sytse Buwalda, Knut Schoch, Bas Ramselaar, Brilliant Classics 1999
- J. S. Bach: Cantatas Vol. 19 – Cantatas from Leipzig 1724, Masaaki Suzuki, Bach Collegium Japan, Yukari Nonoshita, Robin Blaze, Makoto Sakurada, Stephan MacLeod, BIS 2001

== Sources ==
- Wer da gläubet und getauft wird, BWV 37: Scores at the International Music Score Library Project
- Cantata BWV 37 Wer da gläubet und getauft wird: history, scoring, sources for text and music, translations to various languages, discography, discussion, Bach Cantatas Website
- BWV 37 Wer da gläubet und getauft wird: English translation, University of Vermont
- Luke Dahn: BWV 37.6 bach-chorales.com
