= Wo gehest du hin? BWV 166 =

1724 church cantata by Johann Sebastian Bach

Wo gehest du hin?
- BWV 166
- Church cantata by J. S. Bach
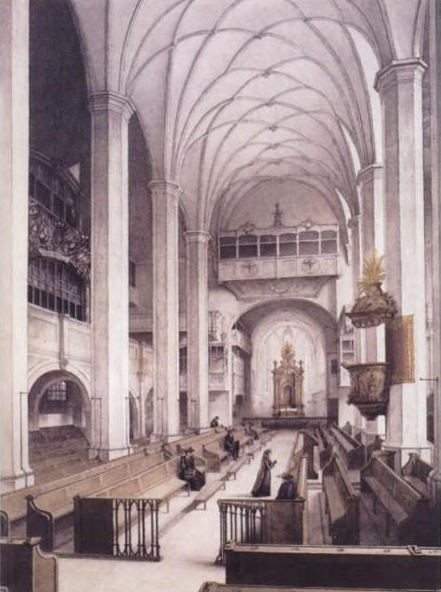
- Thomaskirche, Leipzig, 1885
- Occasion: Cantate Sunday
- Bible text: John 16:5
- Chorale: by Bartholomäus Ringwaldt; "Wer weiß, wie nahe mir mein Ende"
- Performed: 7 May 1724: Leipzig
- Movements: 6
- Vocal: SATB soloists and choir
- Instrumental: oboe; 2 violins; viola; continuo

Wo gehest du hin? ("Where are you heading?", literally: "Where do you go?"), BWV 166, is a church cantata by Johann Sebastian Bach for Cantate Sunday, the fourth Sunday after Easter. Bach composed the work as part of his first cantata cycle for Leipzig and first performed it on 7 May 1724. The topic of the cantata is based on the Farewell Discourse from the Gospel of John, when Jesus announces a Comforter. Based on his question quoted from the narration, "Where do you go?", the cantata explores the direction in which life should go.

Bach structured the work in six movements. The first movement is not the usual extended chorus, but an arioso for a bass setting a question from the gospel. It is followed by an aria for tenor, a hymn stanza for soprano, a recitative for bass and an aria for alto. The closing chorale is a four-part setting of the first stanza of the 1688 hymn "Wer weiß, wie nahe mir mein Ende". The text of the recitative and the arias was written by an unknown librettist. Bach scored the cantata for four voices and a Baroque instrumental ensemble of oboe, strings and continuo.

== History and words ==
Bach had assumed his position as Thomaskantor in Leipzig in May 1723. He composed Wo gehest du hin? as part of his first cantata cycle there for the fourth Sunday after Easter, called Cantate. The prescribed readings for the Sunday were from the Epistle of James, "Every good gift comes from the Father of lights" (James 1:17–21), and from the Gospel of John, Jesus announcing the Comforter in his Farewell Discourse (John 16:5–15).

The identity of the person who was writing Bach's librettos during his first year in Leipzig is not known. The poet began by posing a question, a quotation from the gospel. The answer to the question is the theme of the cantata, which explores the direction in which life should go. The poet inserted as movement 3 the third stanza of Bartholomäus Ringwaldt's hymn "Herr Jesu Christ, ich weiß gar wohl" (1582). As the closing chorale the first stanza of Ämilie Juliane von Schwarzburg-Rudolstadt's "Wer weiß, wie nahe mir mein Ende" (1688).

Bach first performed the cantata on 7 May 1724. There is no information about later performances by Bach.

== Music ==
=== Scoring and structure ===
Bach structured the cantata in six movements, scored for soprano (S), alto (A), tenor (T) and bass (B) soloists, a four-part choir SATB, and a Baroque instrumental ensemble of oboe (Ob), two violins (Vl), viola (Va) and basso continuo.

In the following table of the movements, the scoring follows the Neue Bach-Ausgabe. The keys and time signatures are taken from Alfred Dürrs's standard book The Cantatas of J. S. Bach, using the symbol for common time (4/4). He gives the duration as 17 minutes. The cantus firmus of movement 3 is typically sung by the soprano of the choir.

Movements of Wo gehest du hin?
No.	Title	Text	Type	Vocal	Winds	Strings	Key	Time
1	Wo gehest du hin	Bible	Arioso	B	Ob	2Vl Va	B-flat major	3/8
2	Ich will an den Himmel denken	anon.	Aria	T	Ob	Vl solo	G minor	common time
3	Ich bitte dich, Herr Jesu Christ		Chorale	S		2Vl Va	C minor	common time
4	Gleichwie die Regenwasser bald verfließen	anon.	Recitative	B				common time
5	Man nehme sich in acht	anon.	Aria	A	Ob	2Vl Va	B-flat major	3/4
6	Wer weiß, wie nahe mir mein Ende		Chorale	SATB	Ob	2Vl Va	G minor	common time

=== Movements ===
==== 1 ====
The first movement, an arioso for the bass as the voice of Christ, takes the text "Wo gehest du hin?" from the gospel, part of "But now I am going to him who sent me. None of you asks me, 'Where are you going?'". This simple question is one of the shortest lyrics for a movement in a Bach cantata. It is given it a broader meaning, as if Jesus asked each individual about the destination of life. Its form is between arioso and aria. John Eliot Gardiner, who conducted the Bach Cantata Pilgrimage in 2000, noted that the movement, with shifting stresses in a triple metre, is "an understated yet deeply affecting prelude to the cantata".

==== 2 ====
In the second movement, an aria for tenor, "Ich will an den Himmel denken", the answer to the broader question is given, in a serene meditation, according to Gardiner. Bach illustrated the contrast of "going" versus "staying" in the middle section by rising scales and long notes.

==== 3 ====
The third movement is a hymn stanza, "Ich bitte dich, Herr Jesu Christ", with the cantus firmus, the melody of "Herr Jesu Christ, du höchstes Gut" sung unadorned by the soprano as a prayer for the right faith. The melody is accompanied by the violins and viola in unison, for an impression "of great vigour and determination, urged on by steady continuo quavers", described by Gardiner as "a strong collective and committed response". The music is a precursor of Christe eleison duet in the Mass in B minor.

==== 4 ====
In the fourth movement, a recitative for bass, the singer reflects "Gleichwie die Regenwasser bald verfließen", warning to live alone for earthly pleasures. The bass is now the "counsel of wisdom".

==== 5 ====
The fifth movement is an aria for alto, "Man nehme sich in acht" that reinforces the thought. The oboe reinforces the first violin. The musical illustration is mostly devoted to the word "lacht" (laughs), although the text warns that a fall may come "wenn das Glück lacht" (when fortune winks). The laughter is pictured in "the various oscillating semi-quaver figures in the strings" and in melismas on the word "lacht". The orchestra plays a minuet, interrupted by "frivolous cascades of paired semiquavers" supporting the melismas of the soloist. As Gardiner noted, the "giggling is infectious: voice, oboe and the complete string band at one point erupt in gales of unison laughter".

==== 6 ====
The cantata is concluded by a four-part setting of the first stanza of the hymn "Wer weiß, wie nahe mir mein Ende", a prayer for support in the hour of death. It is sung to the melody of "Wer nur den lieben Gott läßt walten".

=== Manuscripts and publication ===
While the autograph score of Wo gehest du hin? is lost, manuscripts of parts survived, handed down by C. P. E. Bach.

The cantata was published by the Bach-Gesellschaft in the Bach-Gesellschaft Ausgabe (BGA), the first attempt at a complete edition of Bach's works a century after the composer's death, in vol. 33 in 1887. It was edited by Franz Wüllner.

The New Bach Edition (Neue Bach-Ausgabe, NBA) published the work in 1960, edited by Dürr, with critical commentary added the following year. This edition tried to "complete" the tenor by a reconstruction, based on the assumption that a part had been lost. Carus-Verlag published a critical edition in German and English as part of its Stuttgarter Bach-Ausgaben in 2014, edited by Ute Poetzsch. It restored the tenor aria to a three-part accompaniment.

== Recordings ==
The Bach Cantatas Website lists 27 recordings of the cantata as of 2024, including:

Recordings of Wo gehest du hin?
Title	Conductor / Choir / Orchestra	Soloists	Label	Year
Die Bach Kantate Vol. 32	Helmuth Rilling Gächinger Kantorei Bach-Collegium Stuttgart	Helen Watts; Aldo Baldin; Wolfgang Schöne	Hänssler	1978
J. S. Bach: Das Kantatenwerk • Complete Cantatas • Les Cantates, Folge / Vol. 96	Gustav Leonhardt: Tölzer Knabenchor; Collegium Vocale Gent; Leonhardt-Consort	soloist of the Tölzer Knabenchor; Paul Esswood; Kurt Equiluz; Max van Egmond	Teldec	1987
J. S. Bach: Complete Cantatas Vol. 9	Ton Koopman Amsterdam Baroque Orchestra & Choir	Bernhard Landauer; Christoph Prégardien; Klaus Mertens	Antoine Marchand	1998
Bach Cantatas Vol. 24: Altenburg/Warwick	John Eliot Gardiner Monteverdi Choir English Baroque Soloists	Robin Tyson; James Gilchrist; Stephen Varcoe	Soli Deo Gloria	2000
J. S. Bach: Cantatas Vol. 19 (Cantatas from Leipzig 1724)	Masaaki Suzuki Bach Collegium Japan	Robin Blaze; Makoto Sakurada; Stephan MacLeod	BIS	2001
J. S. Bach: Kantate BWV 166 "Wo gehest du hin?"	Rudolf Lutz Chor der J. S. Bach-Stiftung Orchester der J. S. Bach-Stiftung	Terry Wey; Gerd Türk; Markus Volpert	Gallus Media	2008
