= Was frag ich nach der Welt, BWV 94 =

Chorale cantata by Johann Sebastian Bach

Was frag ich nach der Welt
- BWV 94
- Chorale cantata by J. S. Bach
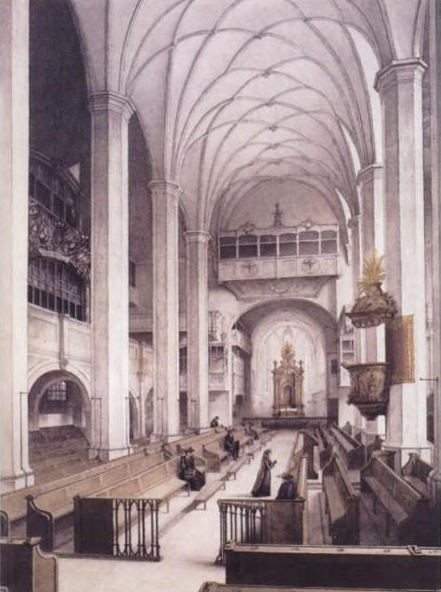
- Thomaskirche, Leipzig
- Occasion: Ninth Sunday after Trinity
- Chorale: "Was frag ich nach der Welt" by Balthasar Kindermann
- Performed: 6 August 1724: Leipzig
- Movements: eight
- Vocal: SATB choir and solo
- Instrumental: flauto traverso; 2 oboes; 2 violins; viola; organ; continuo

Was frag ich nach der Welt (What should I ask of the world), BWV 94 is one of many church cantatas composed by Johann Sebastian Bach. He composed it in Leipzig, setting a text appropriate for the Ninth Sunday after Trinity Sunday, and first performed it on 6 August 1724.

Bach aimed to produce more than one cantata for each occasion in the liturgical year, and Was frag ich nach der Welt belongs to the second cantata cycle that he started after being appointed Thomaskantor in 1723. The work is a chorale cantata, like most of the second cycle, and the work thus also belongs to another cycle, the chorale cantata cycle. The cantata is based on the eight stanzas of the 1664 hymn of the same name by Balthasar Kindermann, with a melody by Ahasverus Fritsch. An unknown librettist retained five chorale stanzas, expending two of those by madrigal text for recitatives, and rephrased the other three into aria texts. The cantata is framed by choral movements, a chorale fantasia at the beginning and a closing chorale setting.

The cantata is scored for four vocal soloists (soprano, alto, tenor and bass), a four-part choir, and a baroque instrumental ensemble of a flauto traverso, two oboes, two violins, viola, organ and continuo. The flute plays a prominent concertante role.

== History and words ==
The cantata is the ninth work of Bach's second annual cycle in Leipzig, the chorale cantata cycle. He composed it for the Ninth Sunday after Trinity. The prescribed readings for the Sunday were from the First Epistle to the Corinthians, a warning of false gods and consolation in temptation (1 Corinthians 10:6–13), and from the Gospel of Luke, the parable of the Unjust Steward (Luke 16:1–9). The cantata is based on the chorale in eight stanzas of the poet Balthasar Kindermann (1664), on a melody by Ahasverus Fritsch. An unknown poet transformed the chorale into a cantata text, retaining stanzas 1, 3, 5, 7 and 8, expanding 3 and 5 by inserted recitatives, and rewriting 2, 4 and 6 into arias. The cantata text is only generally connected to the readings, referring to the statement in the Gospel "for the children of this world are in their generation wiser than the children of light". The poet expresses turning away from the transient world to Jesus.

Bach led the first performance of the cantata, with the Thomanerchor, on 6 August 1724.

== Scoring and structure ==
The cantata in eight movements is scored for four vocal soloists—soprano, alto, tenor and bass–and a four-part choir, flauto traverso, two oboes, two violins, viola, organ and continuo. A typical duration is 23 minutes.

1. Chorale: Was frag ich nach der Welt
2. Aria (bass): Die Welt ist wie ein Rauch und Schatten
3. Recitative + Chorale (tenor): Die Welt sucht Ehr und Ruhm
4. Aria (alto): Betörte Welt, betörte Welt!
5. Recitative + Chorale (bass): Die Welt bekümmert sich
6. Aria (tenor): Die Welt kann ihre Lust und Freud
7. Aria (soprano): Es halt es mit der blinden Welt
8. Chorale: Was frag ich nach der Welt!

== Music ==
The opening chorus is dominated by the concertante flauto traverso in figurations reminiscent of a flute concerto. This is the first Leipzig cantata in which Bach wrote virtuoso music for the flute: an excellent flute player was probably available. Bach seems to have written again for him in Herr Christ, der einge Gottessohn, BWV 96. Two themes of the opening ritornello of twelve measures, one for flute, the other for the strings and oboes, are derived from the melody of the hymn "O Gott, du frommer Gott" (1648). The chorale is sung by the soprano. The lively music in D major seems to represent the "world" rather than its negation.

In the bass aria with continuo, comparing the world to "haze and shadow", tumbling motives illustrate vanishing, falling and breaking, whereas long held notes speak of stability ("besteht").

In the third movement the tenor sings the chorale in rich ornamentation, the accompaniment of two oboes and continuo is similar to the (later) Er ist auf Erden kommen arm in the Christmas Oratorio, #7 of Part I.

The following alto aria, calling the world a "snare and false pretense", is dominated again by the flute. The arias for tenor and soprano are set in dance rhythms, Pastorale and Bourrée, describing the "world" rather than disgust with it. The cantata is concluded by the last two stanzas of the chorale in a four-part setting.

== Recordings ==
- Die Bach Kantate Vol. 46, conductor Helmuth Rilling, Gächinger Kantorei, Bach-Collegium Stuttgart, Helen Donath, Else Paaske, Aldo Baldin, Wolfgang Schöne, Hänssler 1974
- J. S. Bach: Das Kantatenwerk – Sacred Cantatas Vol. 5, conductor Nikolaus Harnoncourt, Tölzer Knabenchor, Concentus Musicus Wien, Paul Esswood, Kurt Equiluz, Philippe Huttenlocher, Teldec 1979
- J. S. Bach: Complete Cantatas Vol. 11, conductor Ton Koopman, Amsterdam Baroque Orchestra & Choir, Sibylla Rubens, Annette Markert, Christoph Prégardien, Klaus Mertens, Antoine Marchand 1999
- J. S. Bach: Cantatas BWV 9, 94 & 187, conductor Sigiswald Kuijken, La Petite Bande, Midori Suzuki, Magdalena Kožená, Knut Schoch, Jan van der Crabben, Deutsche Harmonia Mundi 1999
- Bach Edition Vol. 11 – Cantatas Vol. 5, conductor Pieter Jan Leusink, Holland Boys Choir, Netherlands Bach Collegium, Marjon Strijk, Sytse Buwalda, Nico van der Meel, Bas Ramselaar, Brilliant Classics 1999
- J. S. Bach: Cantatas Trinity Cantatas I, conductor John Eliot Gardiner, Monteverdi Choir, English Baroque Soloists, Katharine Fuge, Daniel Taylor, James Gilchrist, Archiv Produktion 2000
- J. S. Bach: Cantatas Vol. 22 – Cantatas from Leipzig 1724 VI, conductor Masaaki Suzuki, Bach Collegium Japan, Yukari Nonoshita, Robin Blaze, Jan Kobow, Peter Kooy, BIS 2003
