= Ich elender Mensch, wer wird mich erlösen, BWV 48 =

Church cantata by Johann Sebastian Bach

Ich elender Mensch, wer wird mich erlösen
- BWV 48
- Church cantata by Johann Sebastian Bach
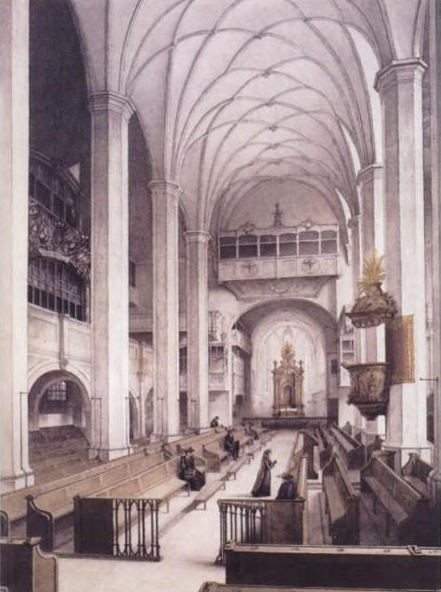
- Thomaskirche, Leipzig
- Occasion: 19th Sunday after Trinity
- Chorale: by Martin Rutilius; by anonymous
- Performed: 3 October 1723: Leipzig
- Movements: 7
- Vocal: SATB choir; alto and tenor soloists
- Instrumental: trumpet; 2 oboes; 2 violins; viola; continuo

Johann Sebastian Bach composed the church cantata Ich elender Mensch, wer wird mich erlösen (Wretched man that I am, who shall deliver me), BWV 48, in Leipzig for the 19th Sunday after Trinity and first performed it on 3 October 1723.

== History and words ==
Bach wrote the cantata in 1723 for the 19th Sunday after Trinity as part of his first cantata cycle. The prescribed readings for the Sunday were from Paul's Epistle to the Ephesians, "put on the new man, which after God is created" (Ephesians 4:22–28), and from the Gospel of Matthew, Healing the paralytic at Capernaum (Matthew 9:1–8). The first movement is written on words from Romans 7:24, stressing the need of the sinner for redemption. The unknown poet saw the soul more in need of rescue than the body, affirmed by a chorale as movement 3, verse 4 of the hymn "Ach Gott und Herr" (1604) attributed to, amongst others, Johann Major and Martin Rutilius. After contemplating ideas based on Psalms 88:11 and 2 Corinthians 12:9, he concludes the cantata in hope, expressed in the closing chorale "Herr Jesu Christ, einiger Trost" (Lord Jesus Christ, only comfort), verse 12 of "Herr Jesu Christ, ich schrei zu dir" (Freiburg 1620).

Bach first performed the cantata on 3 October 1723.

== Scoring and structure ==
The cantata is structured in seven movements, and scored for alto and tenor soloists, a four-part choir, and a Baroque instrumental ensemble of trumpet, two oboes, two violins, viola, and basso continuo.

1. Chorus: Ich elender Mensch, wer wird mich erlösen
2. Recitative (alto): O Schmerz, o Elend, so mich trifft
3. Chorale: Solls ja so sein
4. Aria (alto): Ach, lege das Sodom der sündlichen Glieder
5. Recitative (tenor): Hier aber tut des Heilands Hand
6. Aria (tenor): Vergibt mir Jesus meine Sünden
7. Chorale: Herr Jesu Christ, einiger Trost

== Music ==
An instrumental chorale melody is present in the opening chorus. It may refer to the words "Herr Jesus Christ, du höchstes Gut", but also creates a connection to the closing chorale, which was sung on the same tune, and therefore may also quote its first verse. This chorale cantus firmus is played by the trumpet in canon with the oboes. The strings present themes in the instrumental introduction which are later used as a countersubject to the lamentative theme of the voices.

A recitative of the alto, accompanied by the strings, leads to a chorale, concluding the ideas of the first section in expressive harmonization.

A different mood prevails in the following aria, the voice and the oboe being equal partners in the request to spare the soul. In the last aria the tenor is accompanied by the strings with oboe, music dominated by a lilting rhythm changing between 3/4 time and 3/2 time.

== Recordings ==
- Die Bach Kantate Vol. 51, Helmuth Rilling, Gächinger Kantorei, Bach-Collegium Stuttgart, Marga Höffgen, Aldo Baldin, Hänssler 1973
- J. S. Bach: Das Kantatenwerk – Sacred Cantatas Vol. 5, Nikolaus Harnoncourt, Vienna Boys Choir, Concentus Musicus Wien, Paul Esswood, Kurt Equiluz, Teldec 1974
- J. S. Bach: Complete Cantatas Vol. 9, Ton Koopman, Amsterdam Baroque Orchestra & Choir, Bernhard Landauer, Christoph Prégardien, Antoine Marchand 1998
- Bach Cantatas Vol. 10, John Eliot Gardiner, Monteverdi Choir, English Baroque Soloists, William Towers, James Gilchrist, Soli Deo Gloria 2000
- Bach: Wie schön leuchtet der Morgenstern – Cantata BWV 1, 48, 78 & 140, Karl-Friedrich Beringer, Windsbacher Knabenchor, Deutsche Kammer-Virtuosen Berlin, Sibylla Rubens, Rebecca Martin, Markus Schäfer, Klaus Mertens, Sony Music 2011
- J. S. Bach: Ich elender Mensch – Leipzig Cantatas, Philippe Herreweghe, Collegium Vocale Gent, Dorothee Mields, Damien Guillon, Thomas Hobbs, Peter Kooy, Phi 2014

== Sources ==
- Ich elender Mensch, wer wird mich erlösen, BWV 48: performance by the Netherlands Bach Society (video and background information)
- Ich elender Mensch, wer wird mich erlösen, BWV 48: Scores at the International Music Score Library Project
- Ich elender Mensch, wer wird mich erlösen BWV 48; BC A 144 / Sacred cantata (19th Sunday after Trinity) Bach Digital
- Cantata BWV 48 Ich elender Mensch, wer wird mich erlösen history, scoring, sources for text and music, translations to various languages, discography, discussion, Bach Cantatas Website
- BWV 48 Ich elender Mensch, wer wird mich erlösen English translation, University of Vermont
- BWV 48 Ich elender Mensch, wer wird mich erlösen text, scoring, University of Alberta
- Chapter 21 Bwv 48 – The Cantatas of Johann Sebastian Bach Julian Mincham, 2010
- Luke Dahn: BWV 48.7 bach-chorales.com
