= Herr Jesu Christ, du höchstes Gut, BWV 113 =

Chorale cantata by Johann Sebastian Bach

Herr Jesu Christ, du höchstes Gut
- BWV 113
- Chorale cantata by J. S. Bach
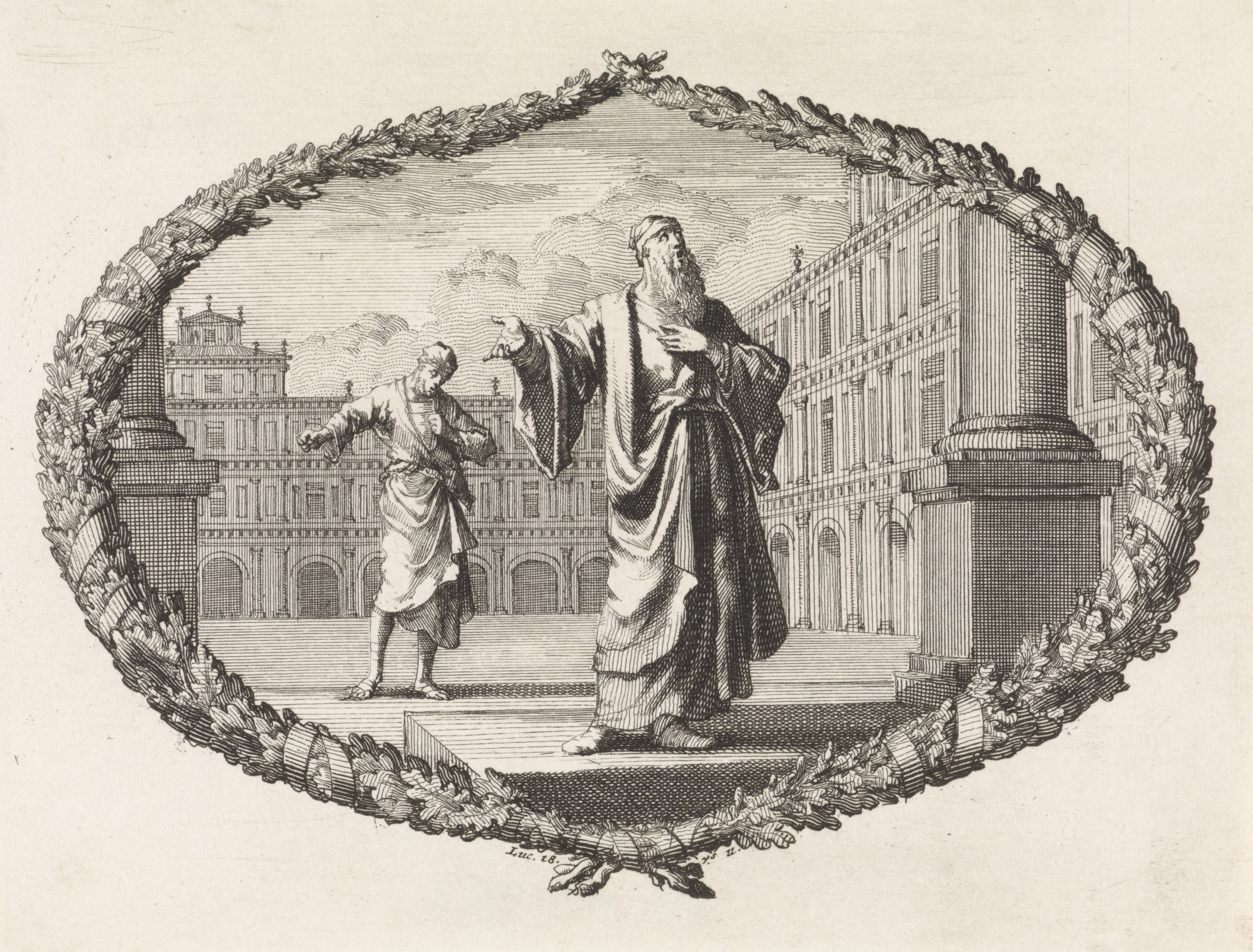
- 18th-century depiction of Pharisee and tax collector
- Occasion: Eleventh Sunday after Trinity
- Chorale: "Herr Jesu Christ, du höchstes Gut" by Bartholomäus Ringwaldt
- Performed: 20 August 1724: Leipzig
- Movements: 8
- Vocal: SATB choir and solo
- Instrumental: 2 oboes d'amore; flauto traverso; 2 violins; viola; continuo

Herr Jesu Christ, du höchstes Gut (Lord Jesus Christ, O highest good), BWV 113, is a church cantata by Johann Sebastian Bach. He composed it in Leipzig for the eleventh Sunday after Trinity and first performed it on 20 August 1724. It is based on the eight stanzas of the 1588 hymn "Herr Jesu Christ, du höchstes Gut" by Bartholomäus Ringwaldt, a penitential song.

The cantata belongs to Bach's chorale cantata cycle, the second cantata cycle during his tenure as Thomaskantor that began in 1723. Unusually for the cycle, the cantata text remains close to the chorale poetry, retaining the first, second, fourth and last stanzas unchanged and using quotations from other stanzas; the text of the fourth stanza is interspersed with contemporary lines by an unknown librettist, who also paraphrased the remaining stanzas. The first movement is a chorale fantasia, while the middle solo movements alternate arias and recitative. The work is closed by a four-part chorale setting. The cantata is scored for four vocal soloists, a four-part choir, and a Baroque instrumental ensemble of two oboes d'amore, flauto traverso, strings and basso continuo.

== History, hymn and words ==
Bach composed the cantata in Leipzig for the Eleventh Sunday after Trinity as part of his chorale cantata cycle. The prescribed readings for the Sunday were from the First Epistle to the Corinthians, on the gospel of Christ and his (Paul's) duty as an apostle (1 Corinthians 15:1–10), and from the Gospel of Luke, the parable of the Pharisee and the Tax Collector (Luke 18:9–14).

The text of the cantata is based on the eight stanzas of Bartholomäus Ringwaldt's 1588 hymn of the same name, a song of penitence related to the tax collector's prayer "Herr, sei mir armem Sünder gnädig" (God be merciful to me a sinner). While some attributed the melody also to Ringwaldt, Sven Hiemke says in his foreword to the Carus edition that the composer is unknown but it dates to the same period.

An unknown librettist retained more text unchanged than in most works of the chorale cantata cycle which usually feature original poetry only in the outer movements. The poet used stanzas 1, 2, 4 and 8 unchanged, inserting recitative for the fourth movement. He paraphrased the ideas of the remaining stanzas to arias and a recitative, retaining the beginning of stanzas 3 and 7. Stanzas 5 and 6 were treated most freely, including ideas from the epistle, such as the promise of mercy which is only asked but not promised in the chorale. The poet referred to several verses from different gospels to underscore that thought, Luke 15:2 in both 5 and 6, Matthew 9:2 (parallel Luke 7:48) in 5, and Matthew 11:28 in 6, paraphrased as "Er ruft: Kommt her zu mir, die ihr mühselig und beladen" (He calls: come here to Me, you who are weary and burdened). The last verse also appears in Handel's Messiah, turned in the third person: "Come unto Him, all ye that labour", in the soprano section of He shall feed His flock like a shepherd.

Bach led the Thomanerchor in the first performance on 20 August 1724.

== Music ==
=== Structure and scoring ===
Bach structured the cantata in eight movements. Both text and tune of the hymn are retained in the outer movements, a chorale fantasia and a four-part closing chorale. Bach scored the work for four vocal soloists (soprano (S), alto (A), tenor (T) and bass (B)), a four-part choir, and a Baroque instrumental ensemble of two oboes d'amore (Oa), flauto traverso (Ft), two violin parts (Vl), one viola part (Va), and basso continuo.

In the following table of the movements, the scoring, keys and time signatures are taken from Dürr. The continuo, which plays throughout, is not shown.

Movements of Herr Jesu Christ, du höchstes Gut
No.	Title	Text	Type	Vocal	Winds	Strings	Key	Time
1	Herr Jesu Christ, du höchstes Gut	Ringwaldt	Chorale fantasia	SATB	2Oa	2Vl Va	B minor	3/4
2	Erbarm dich mein in solcher Last	Ringwaldt	Chorale	A		2Vl Va	F-sharp minor	common time
3	Fürwahr, wenn mir das kömmet ein	anon.	Aria	B	2Oa		A major	12/8
4	Jedoch dein heilsam Wort, das macht	Ringwaldt, anon.	Chorale and recitative	B			E minor	common time
5	Jesus nimmt die Sünder an	anon.	Aria	T	Ft		D major	common time
6	Der Heiland nimmt die Sünder an	anon.	Recitative	T		2Vl Va		common time
7	Ach Herr, mein Gott, vergib mirs doch	anon.	Aria	S A			E minor	common time
8	Stärk mich mit deinem Freudengeist	Ringwaldt	Chorale	SATB	2Oa	2Vl Va	B minor	common time

=== Movements ===
==== 1 ====
The opening chorus, "Herr Jesu Christ, du höchstes Gut" (Lord Jesus Christ, O highest good), is an unusual opening for the chorale cantata cycle, because the voices are set in homophony, with the chorale tune in the soprano, in an unusual triple meter and sometimes embellished. The lines of the chorale are separated by independent ritornellos of the orchestra, with a theme derived from the chorale melody. A solo violin in virtuoso figuration plays throughout, while the oboes and the other strings are silent during the vocal passages except for the final line.

==== 2 ====
In the second movement, "Erbarm dich mein in solcher Last" (Have mercy on me burdened so), the unchanged second stanza of the chorale is sung by the alto, unadorned and in common time. The voice is part of a trio, with the violins in unison and the continuo; this is a setting similar to movements that Bach transcribed to Schübler Chorales. A main motif of the instruments, used in imitation, is a stepwise descending fourth which appears in the chorale tune. It can be seen as illustrating the end of the gospel reading, "he that humbleth himself" or as the burden of the sinner.

==== 3 ====
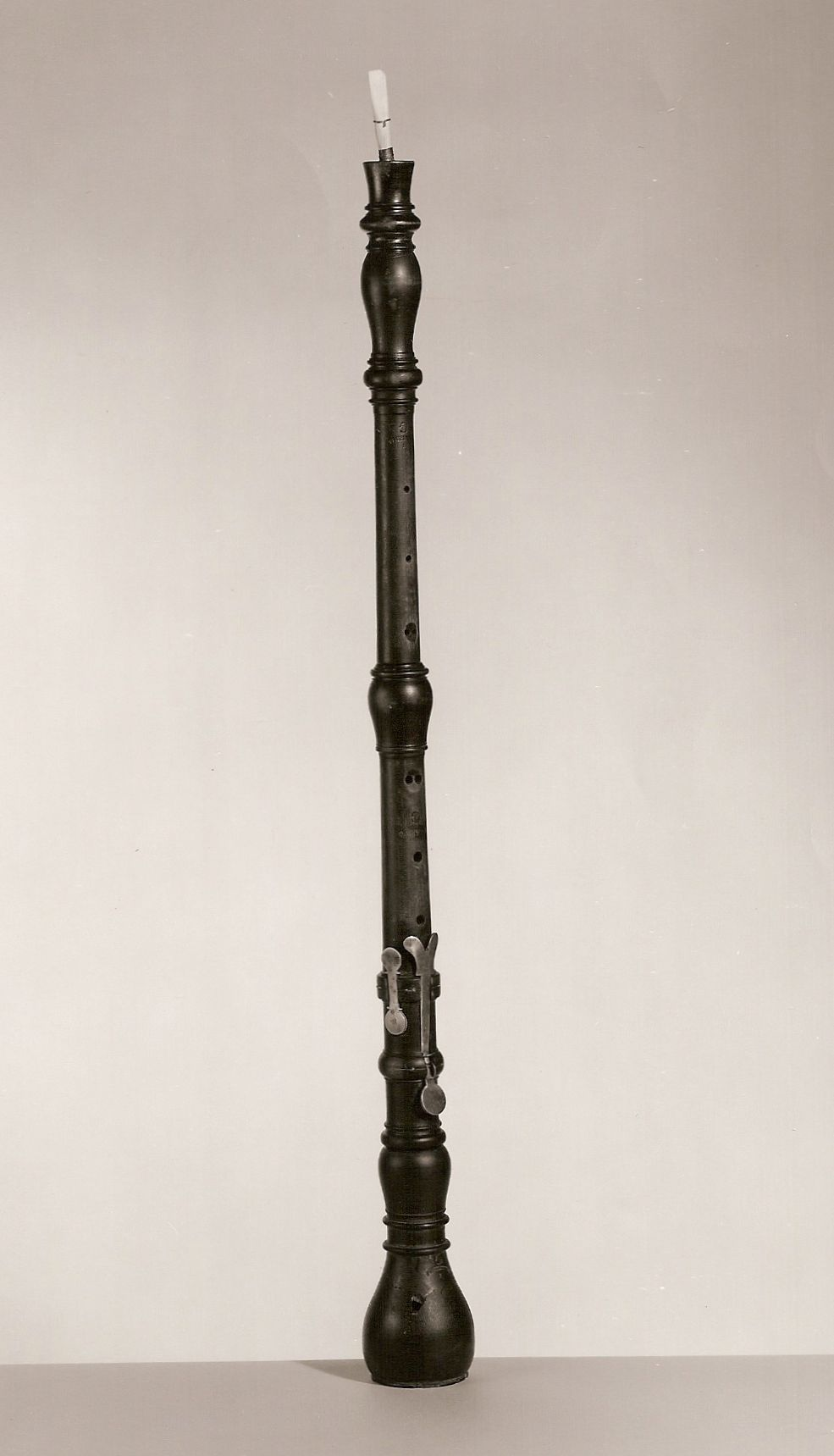
Oboe d'amore

In the first aria, "Fürwahr, wenn mir das kömmet ein" (Truly, when it comes to pass), the bass is accompanied by two oboes d'amore. The theme is related to the chorale tune, but turned to the major mode and in a swinging 12/8 time. The voice picks up the same theme and elaborates the word "gewandelt" (changed) in an extended coloratura. The oboes often play in parallels of thirds and sixths, creating a pastoral mood that conveys the idea of consolation, a key word in the text. In contrast, a motif of chromatic steps upwards illustrate "Zittern, Furcht" (trembling, fear).

The musicologist Boyd noted a similarity of the movement to the aria Et in Spiritum sanctum from Bach's later Mass in B minor; both are for the bass, in a compound time, in A major and with two oboes.

==== 4 ====
The fourth movement combines the chorale stanza, "Jedoch dein heilsam Wort, das macht mit seinem süßen Singen" (However your healing Word, with its sweet singing, acts), interspersed with free recitative. The bass sings the chorale text to the chorale tune and the new lines as secco recitative. The chorale passages are accompanied by continuous coloraturas from the continuo that illustrate the text's "sweet singing" and a "laughing and leaping heart".

==== 5 ====
The second aria, "Jesus nimmt die Sünder an" (Jesus takes sinners to himself), is accompanied by an obbligato flute, as in the cantatas of the two preceding weeks, Was frag ich nach der Welt, BWV 94, and Nimm von uns, Herr, du treuer Gott, BWV 101. The flute acts in dialogue with the voice. The last line of the text is the last line of the chorale stanza, but without its melody.

==== 6 ====
The recitative, "Der Heiland nimmt die Sünder an" (The Savior takes sinners to himself), is accompanied by the strings, after four movements without them. They enter in the second measure on the words "wie lieblich klingt das Wort in meinem Ohren!" (how sweetly this word rings in my ears!), called a "magical moment" by Craig Smith. The recitative culminates in the prayer of the tax collector.

==== 7 ====
The last aria, "Ach Herr, mein Gott, vergib mirs doch" (Ah Lord, my God, forgive), is set for two voices and continuo, focused on the text without ritornellos like a chorale concerto of the 17th century. The chorale melody in embellished form appears in several lines, even on words other than the original text. The voices often sing in coloraturas and parallels, illustrating the chorale's final idea of "kindlicher Gehorsam" (childlike obedience).

==== 8 ====
The final stanza of the chorale, "Stärk mich mit deinem Freudengeist" (Strengthen me with your joyful Spirit), is set for four parts. It is softened by passing eighth-notes in the lower voices.

== Manuscripts and publication ==
An original score of the cantata is preserved. The cantata was first published in 1876 in the first complete edition of Bach's work, the Bach-Gesellschaft Ausgabe; the volume in question was edited by Alfred Dörffel. In the Neue Bach-Ausgabe it was published in 1986, edited by Ernest May, with a critical report in 1985.

== Recordings ==
A list of recordings is provided on the Bach Cantatas Website. Ensembles playing period instruments in historically informed performance are shown with a green background.

Recordings of Herr Jesu Christ, du höchstes Gut
Title	Conductor / Choir / Orchestra	Soloists	Label	Year	Orch. type
Die Bach Kantate Vol. 48	Helmuth Rilling Gächinger Kantorei Bach-Collegium Stuttgart	Arleen Augér; Gabriele Schreckenbach; Adalbert Kraus; Niklaus Tüller	Hänssler	1973	
J. S. Bach: Das Kantatenwerk • Complete Cantatas • Les Cantates, Folge / Vol. 6	Gustav Leonhardt: Knabenchor Hannover; Collegium Vocale Gent; Leonhardt-Consort	soloist of the Knabenchor Hannover; René Jacobs; Kurt Equiluz; Max van Egmond	Teldec	1981	Period
Bach Edition Vol. 4 – Cantatas Vol. 1	Pieter Jan Leusink Holland Boys Choir Netherlands Bach Collegium	Ruth Holton; Sytse Buwalda; Knut Schoch; Bas Ramselaar	Brilliant Classics	1999	Period
J. S. Bach: Complete Cantatas Vol. 11	Ton Koopman Amsterdam Baroque Orchestra & Choir	Sibylla Rubens; Annette Markert; Christoph Prégardien; Klaus Mertens	Antoine Marchand	1999	Period
J. S. Bach: Trinity Cantatas II	John Eliot Gardiner Monteverdi Choir English Baroque Soloists	Magdalena Kožená; William Towers; Mark Padmore; Stephan Loges	Soli Deo Gloria	2000	Period
J. S. Bach: Cantatas Vol. 24 Cantatas from Leipzig 1724	Masaaki Suzuki Bach Collegium Japan	Yukari Nonoshita; Robin Blaze; Gerd Türk; Peter Kooy	BIS	2002	Period
