= Auf Christi Himmelfahrt allein, BWV 128 =

Church cantata by Johann Sebastian Bach

Auf Christi Himmelfahrt allein
- BWV 128
- Church cantata by J. S. Bach
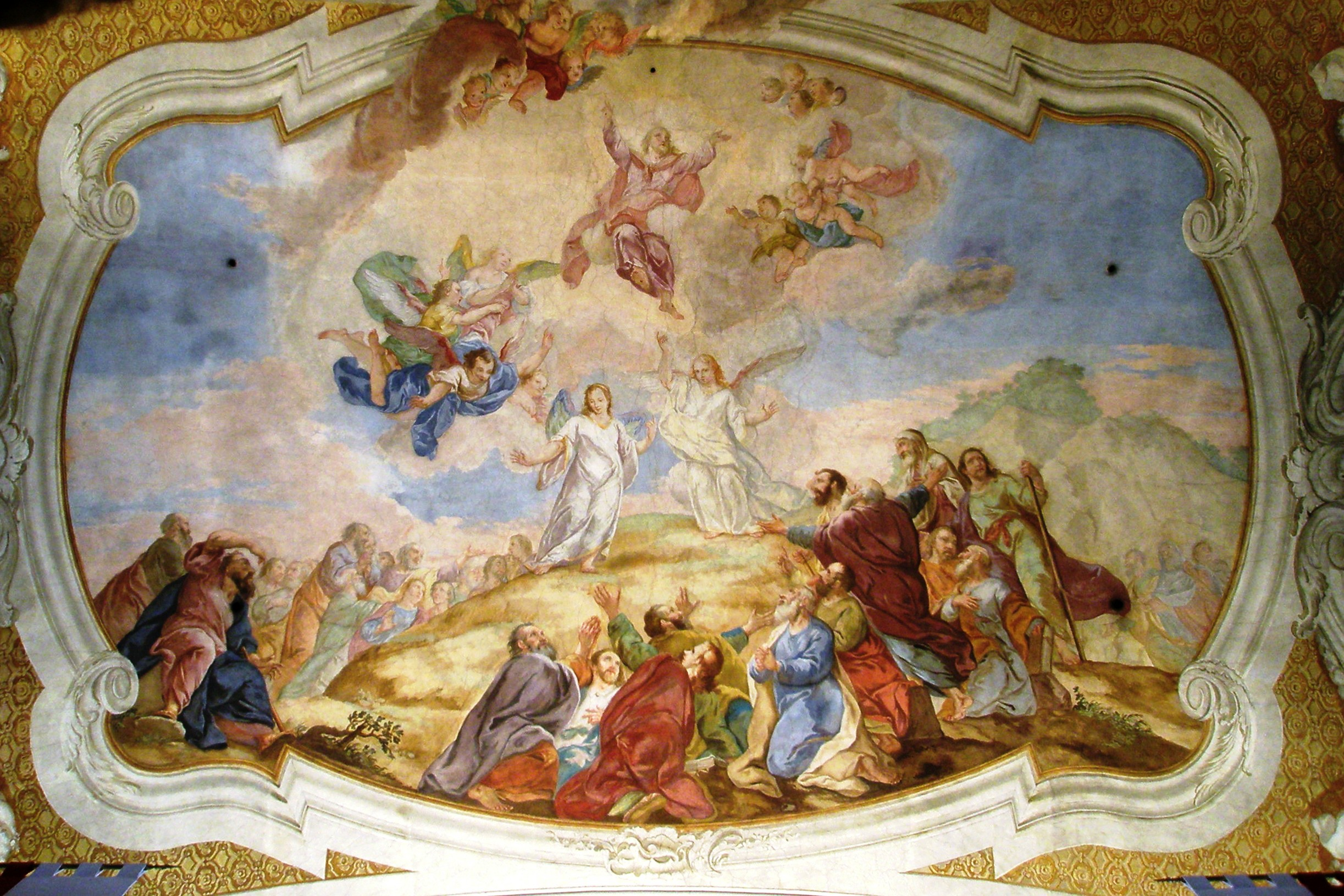
- Ascension, occasion of the cantata, Church of the Holy Cross in Jelenia Góra
- Occasion: Feast of the Ascension
- Cantata text: Christiana Mariana von Ziegler
- Chorale: by Matthäus Avenarius
- Performed: 10 May 1725: Leipzig
- Movements: 5
- Vocal: SATB choir; solo: alto, tenor and bass
- Instrumental: 2 horns; trumpet; 2 oboes; oboe d'amore; oboe da caccia; 2 violins; viola; continuo

Auf Christi Himmelfahrt allein (On Christ's ascension into heaven alone), BWV 128, (Note: "BWV" is Bach-Werke-Verzeichnis, a thematic catalogue of Bach's works.) is a church cantata by Johann Sebastian Bach. Bach composed it in Leipzig for the Feast of the Ascension and led the first performance on 10 May 1725.

It is the fourth of nine cantatas on texts by Christiana Mariana von Ziegler, with whom Bach collaborated at the end of his second cantata cycle. It begins, unlike the previous three, with a chorale fantasia like the chorale cantatas, using the first stanza of a 1636 hymn for Ascension Day by Ernst Sonnemann. For a closing chorale she used the fourth stanza of "O Jesu, meine Lust" with text by Matthäus Avenarius. The theme of the cantata is the reaction of the believer to the absence of Jesus, including hope to see him again "face to face". Bach scored the cantata for three vocal soloists (alto, tenor and bass), a four-part choir and a Baroque instrumental ensemble of two horns, trumpet, two oboes, oboe d'amore, oboe da caccia, strings and basso continuo, in a rich and varied instrumentation.

== History and words ==
Bach composed the cantata in his second year in Leipzig for the feast of the Ascension. The prescribed readings for the feast day were an epistle reading from the Acts of the Apostles, Jesus telling his disciples to preach and baptize, and his Ascension (Acts 1:1–11), and a Gospel reading from Mark (Mark 16:14–20). In his second year in Leipzig, Bach had composed chorale cantatas between the first Sunday after Trinity and Palm Sunday, but for Easter returned to cantatas on more varied texts, possibly because he lost his librettist. Nine of his cantatas for the period between Easter and Pentecost are based on texts of Christiana Mariana von Ziegler, including this cantata. Bach later inserted most of them in his third annual cycle, but kept this one and BWV 68 for Pentecost in his second annual cycle, possibly because they both begin with a chorale fantasia like the chorale cantatas, whereas many of the others begin with a bass solo as the vox Christi.

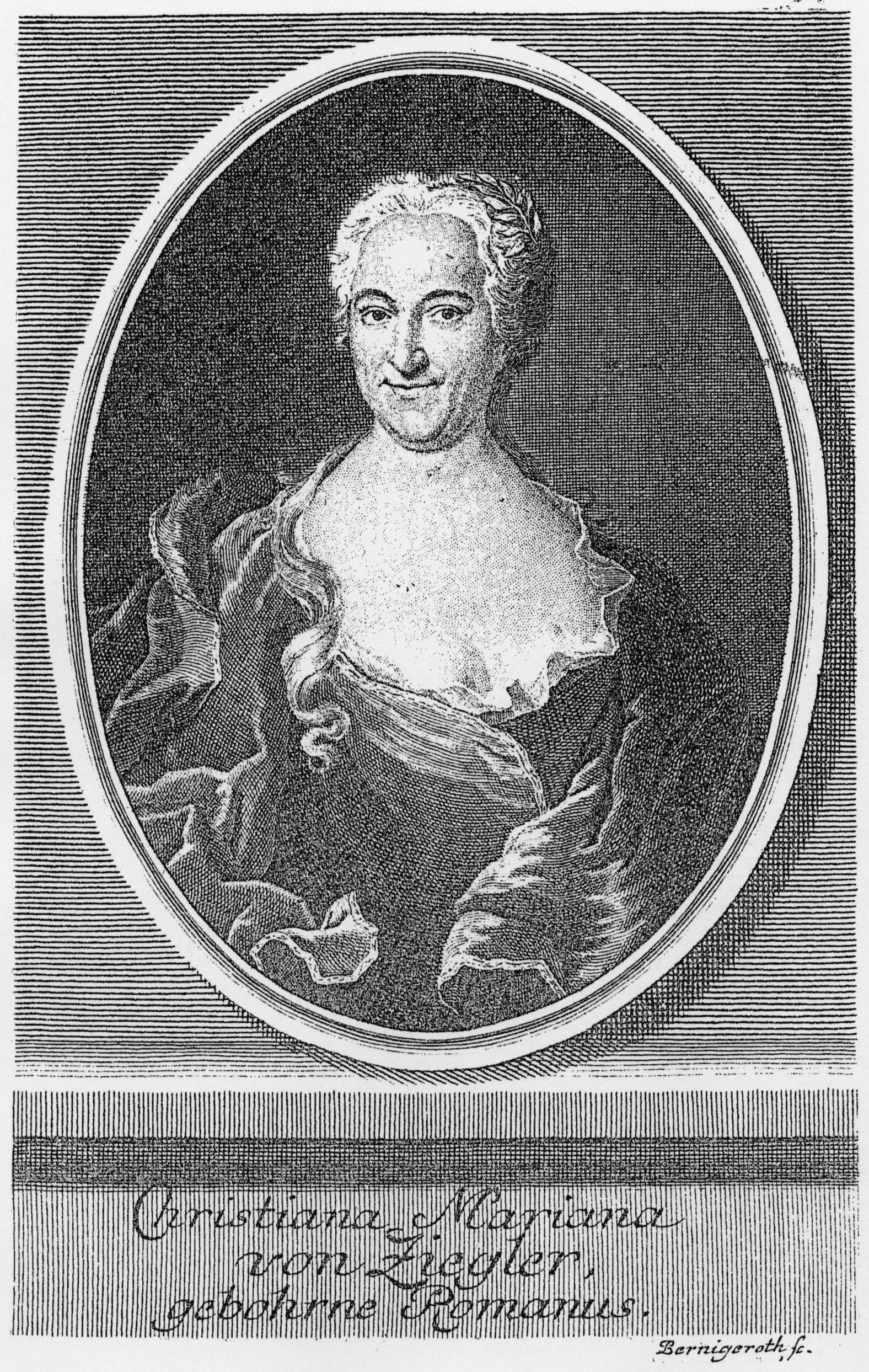
Engraving of Christiana Mariana von Ziegler

The poet expressed a personal view, writing in the first person. She took the theme of the cantata from the first stanza of Ernst Sonnemann's chorale after Josua Wegelin (1636): once Jesus ascended to heaven, there is nothing left to keep me on earth, as I am promised to see him "from face to face", a paraphrase of 1 Corinthians 13. In the second movement, she alludes to the Transfiguration of Jesus (Matthew 17:4), while the third movement sees the incomprehensible power of Jesus everywhere, not restricted to a certain location: He will lift me to his right hand, according to Matthew 25:33, and will judge me right, according to the closing chorale, the fourth stanza of Matthäus Avenarius' "O Jesu, meine Lust".

Ziegler's text, printed in 1728 in the collection Versuch in gebundener Schreib-Art, and the cantata text differ, possibly changed by Bach himself. For example, an aria and recitative are combined to one movement by inserting "wo mein Erlöser lebt" (where my redeemer lives) as a connection.

Bach led the Thomanerchor in the first performance of the cantata on 10 May 1725.

== Music ==
=== Structure and scoring ===
Bach structured the cantata in five movements, framing solo recitatives and arias with two chorale movements, a chorale fantasia and a closing chorale. While the opening in a chorale fantasia is similar to Bach's chorale cantatas, the middle movements and the closing chorale are independent of the chorale. Bach scored the work for three vocal soloists (alto (A), tenor (T) and bass (B)), a four-part choir, and a festive Baroque instrumental ensemble of two horns (Co), trumpet (Tr), two oboes (Ob), oboe d'amore (Oa), oboe da caccia (Oc), two violins (Vl), viola (Va) and basso continuo. The instrumentation is especially rich and varied; Julian Mincham observes: "As befits its importance, the instrumental forces are relatively large and impressive; two horns, oboes of every kind, strings and continuo and latterly one trumpet." The duration of the cantata is given as 22 minutes.

In the following table of the movements, the scoring follows the Neue Bach-Ausgabe. The keys and time signatures are taken from Alfred Dürr's standard work Die Kantaten von Johann Sebastian Bach, using the symbol for common time (4/4). The continuo, playing throughout, is not shown.

Movements of Auf Christi Himmelfahrt allein
No.	Title	Text	Type	Vocal	Winds	Strings	Key	Time
1	Auf Christi Himmelfahrt allein	Sonnemann	Chorus	SATB	2Co 2Ob Oc	2Vl Va	G major	common time
2	Ich bin bereit, komm, hole mich	Ziegler	Recitative	T				common time
3	Auf, auf, mit hellem Schall	Ziegler	Aria and recitative	B	Tr	2Vl Va	D major	3/4
4	Sein Allmacht zu ergründen	Ziegler	Aria	A T	Oa		B minor	6/8
5	Alsdenn so wirst du mich	Avenarius	Chorale	SATB	2Co Ob Oc	2Vl Va	G major	common time

=== Movements ===
==== 1 ====
The opening chorus, "Auf Christi Himmelfahrt allein ich meine Nachfahrt gründe" (On Christ's ascension into heaven alone I base my own ensuing journey), is a chorale fantasia on the melody of the German Gloria "Allein Gott in der Höh sei Ehr" by Nikolaus Decius, embedded in an orchestral concerto. The cantus firmus is in the soprano in long notes, whereas the lower voices engage in imitation. Bach derived the highly figurative motifs of the instruments from the chorale tune: both a signal -- played first by the strings and oboes, then the two horns -- and a fugue subject. Both motifs contain notes from the first line of the tune in the same order as in the tune: the signal contains the first five notes, the fugue subject all nine notes.

==== 2 ====
The tenor expresses in a recitative the situation of a human dealing with the absence of Jesus and longing to follow him, away from a world experienced as unpleasant: "Ich bin bereit, komm, hole mich! Hier in der Welt Ist Jammer, Angst und Pein" (I am ready, come, take me! Here in the world are suffering, fear, and pain).

==== 3 ====
In an unusual combination of aria and recitative, the bass voice proclaims: "Auf, auf, mit hellem Schall verkündigt überall: mein Jesus sitzt zur Rechten!" (Up, up, with clarion ring proclaim everywhere: my Jesus sits at the right hand!). Only in this movement of the cantata, Bach uses the trumpet, the royal instrument of the Baroque, to symbolize the reign of Jesus. The trumpet appears first in the ritornello, which is repeated by the voice and again with the voice embedded. After a middle section, the first part of the aria is not repeated da capo; instead the added line is set as a recitative accompanied by strings, followed by a repeat of only the ritornello.

==== 4 ====
The following duet of alto and tenor, "Sein Allmacht zu ergründen, wird sich kein Menschen finden" (To fathom his omnipotence no human can discern), is of intimate character. The obbligato instrument is marked "organo" in the score, but the music is written in the oboe part and appears to have been composed for an oboe d'amore. Possibly Bach changed his intentions during the process of composition, or he may have changed the marking later. Max Reger used the movement's ritornello theme for his Bach-Variationen Op. 81.

==== 5 ====
The cantata is closed by a four-part chorale, "Alsdenn so wirst du mich zu deiner Rechten stellen" (Therefore you shall place me at your right hand), sung to a melody by Ahasverus Fritsch also used for “O Gott, du frommer Gott”. Most instruments play colla parte with the four-part setting of the voices, while the horns play different parts because of their limited range.

== Manuscripts and publication ==
The original manuscript of the cantata was accepted in lieu of £3,650,000 in inheritance tax by the British Government from the estate of Ralph Kohn and allocated to the Bodleian Library in 2024.

The cantata was first published in 1878 in the first complete edition of Bach's work, the Bach-Gesellschaft Ausgabe. The volume in which the cantata appeared was edited by Alfred Dörffel. In 1960, the cantata was published in the Neue Bach-Ausgabe, the second complete edition of Bach's works, where it was edited by Dürr.

== Recordings ==
The selection is taken from the listing on the Bach Cantatas website. Instrumental groups playing period instruments in historically informed performances are marked green.

Recordings of Auf Christi Himmelfahrt allein
Title	Conductor / Choir / Orchestra	Soloists	Label	Year	Instr.
Bach Made in Germany Vol. 1 – Cantatas V	Günther Ramin Thomanerchor Gewandhausorchester	Lotte Wolf-Matthäus; Gert Lutze; Johannes Oettel	Eterna	1953	
Bach Cantatas Vol. 2 – Easter	Helmut Winschermann Kantorei Barmen-Gemarke Deutsche Bachsolisten	Julia Hamari; Kurt Equiluz; Hermann Prey	Philips	1971	
Die Bach Kantate Vol. 35	Helmuth Rilling Gächinger Kantorei Bach-Collegium Stuttgart	Gabriele Schreckenbach; Aldo Baldin; Wolfgang Schöne	Hänssler	1981	
J. S. Bach: Das Kantatenwerk • Complete Cantatas • Les Cantates, Folge / Vol. 7	Gustav Leonhardt: Knabenchor Hannover; Collegium Vocale Gent; Leonhardt-Consort	René Jacobs; Kurt Equiluz; Max van Egmond	Teldec	1983	Period
J. S. Bach: Ascension Cantatas	John Eliot Gardiner Monteverdi Choir English Baroque Soloists	Robin Blaze; Christoph Genz; Reinhard Hagen	Archiv Produktion	1993	Period
Bach Edition Vol. 12 – Cantatas Vol. 6	Pieter Jan Leusink Holland Boys Choir Netherlands Bach Collegium	Sytse Buwalda; Nico van der Meel; Bas Ramselaar	Brilliant Classics	1999	Period
J. S. Bach: Complete Cantatas Vol. 15	Ton Koopman Amsterdam Baroque Orchestra & Choir	Bogna Bartosz; Jörg Dürmüller; Klaus Mertens	Antoine Marchand	2001	Period
J. S. Bach: Cantatas Vol. 35 (Cantatas from Leipzig 1725)	Masaaki Suzuki Bach Collegium Japan	Robin Blaze; Makoto Sakurada; Peter Kooy	BIS	2001	Period
