= Monteverdi Choir =

Early music choir (founded 1964)

For over 60 years, the Monteverdi Choir has been recognised as one of the greatest and most influential choirs in the world. Founded in 1964 by Sir John Eliot Gardiner for a performance of the Vespro della Beata Vergine in King's College Chapel, Cambridge, the Choir has become famous for its stylistic conviction and extensive repertoire, encompassing music from the Renaissance period to Classical music of the 20th century. They often appear with the English Baroque Soloists and Orchestre Révolutionnaire et Romantique, also founded by John Eliot Gardiner.

In 2023, the Choir and English Baroque Soloists performed at the Coronation of HM King Charles III, with The Daily Telegraph proclaiming "if the Monteverdi Choir isn’t singing when I get to the gates of Heaven, I want my money back".

In 2000, the 250th anniversary of Johann Sebastian Bach's death, the choir undertook the Bach Cantata Pilgrimage, performing and recording most of his church cantatas in more than 60 historic churches throughout Europe, and some in the U.S.

On 5 March 2014 the Choir celebrated its 50th anniversary with a repeat performance of the Monteverdi Vespers from King's College Chapel, in a live broadcast live by BBC Radio 3. In 2023, it was one of the choirs selected to sing at the coronation of Charles III and Camilla. The Choir together with the Orchestre Révolutionnaire et Romantique toured Europe with Berlioz's Les Troyens, conducted by Dinis Sousa, in the summer of 2023. The Choir was named 'Best Choir' at the Oper! Awards ceremony held at the Dutch National Opera in Amsterdam on 29 January 2024.

In July 2024, it was announced that John Eliot Gardiner was resigning as Artistic Director of the choir.

In December 2024 they recorded with The English Baroque Solists Baroque Christmas: Messe de minuit H.9, In nativitatem Domini canticum H.416, Noëls sur les instruments H.531 & H.534 by Marc-Antoine Charpentier. The conductor was Christophe Rousset (Monteverdi productions ltd. SDG737. 2025).

== Bach Cantata Pilgrimage ==
In 2000 the Choir, with the English Baroque Soloists, undertook an ambitious tour, the Bach Cantata Pilgrimage, in which it performed almost all of Johann Sebastian Bach's church cantatas in more than 60 churches in Europe and the US to celebrate the 250th anniversary of the composer's death. The dates followed the occasions of the liturgical year for which Bach had assigned his compositions. Some of the churches are connected to Bach's life.

Recordings of a number of the cantatas were released by Deutsche Grammophon on the Archiv label. However, most of the recordings made during the Bach Cantata Pilgrimage have been released in 28 volumes on Gardiner's own label, Soli Deo Gloria (recordings released by Deutsche Grammophon will not be released again on Soli Deo Gloria). The series was completed in 2012 with a live recording in London of cantatas for Ascension Day that were performed in Salisbury during the pilgrimage, but were not recorded for technical reasons. It is possible that some cantatas which were not performed during the pilgrimage will be added to the recording project, such as works for the inauguration of the Leipzig town council.

Sortable table
BWV	Title	Occasion	Recorded at	on	Vol.	SDG no.
1	Wie schön leuchtet der Morgenstern, BWV 1	Feast of the Annunciation	Walpole, St Peter's Church	2000/03/26	21	118
2	Ach Gott, vom Himmel sieh darein	Trinity 02	—	2000/07/02	2	165
3	Ach Gott, wie manches Herzeleid	Epiphany 2	Greenwich, Old Royal Naval College Chpl.	2000/01/16	19	115
4	Christ lag in Todes Banden	Easter	Eisenach, Georgenkirche	2000/04/23	22	128
5	Wo soll ich fliehen hin	Trinity 19	Potsdam, Erlöserkirche	2000/10/29	10	110
6	Bleib bei uns, denn es will Abend werden	Easter Monday (Angelus)	Eisenach, Georgenkirche	2000/04/24	22	128
7	Christ unser Herr zum Jordan kam	St. John the Baptist	London, St. Giles Cripplegate	2000/06/24	1	101
8	Liebster Gott, wenn werd ich sterben	Trinity 16	Santiago de Compostela, Santo Domingo	2000/10/07	8	104
9	Es ist das Heil uns kommen her	Trinity 06	—	2000/07/30	4	156
10	Meine Seel erhebt den Herren	Feast of the Visitation	—	2000/07/02	2	165
11	Lobet Gott in seinen Reichen	Ascension Day	—	2000/06/01	N/A	N/A
12	Weinen, Klagen, Sorgen, Zagen	Jubilate	Altenburg, Schlosskirche	2000/05/14	24	107
13	Meine Seufzer, meine Tränen	Epiphany 2	Greenwich, Old Royal Naval College Chpl.	2000/01/16	19	115
14	Wär Gott nicht mit uns diese Zeit	Epiphany 4	Romsey, Romsey Abbey	2000/01/30	19	115
15	Denn du wirst meine Seele nicht in der Hölle lassen	Easter	not part of the BCP project (spurious)			
16	Herr Gott, dich loben wir	Feast of the Circumcision	Berlin, Gethsemanekirche	2000/01/01	17	150
17	Wer Dank opfert, der preiset mich	Trinity 14	Ambronay, Abbaye d'Ambronay	2000/09/24	7	124
18	Gleichwie der Regen und Schnee vom Himmel fällt	Sexagesima	Nottinghamshire, Southwell Minster	2000/02/27	20	153
19	Es erhub sich ein Streit	Michaelmas Day	Bremen, Unser Lieben Frauen	2000/09/29	7	124
20	O Ewigkeit, du Donnerwort	Trinity 01	London, St. Giles Cripplegate	2000/06/25	1	101
21	Ich hatte viel Bekümmernis	Trinity 03	—	2000/07/09	2	165
22	Jesus nahm zu sich die Zwölfe	Quinquagesima	Cambridge, King's College Chapel	2000/03/05	21	118
23	Du wahrer Gott und Davids Sohn	Quinquagesima	Cambridge, King's College Chapel	2000/03/05	21	118
24	Ein ungefärbt Gemüte	Trinity 04	Tewkesbury, Abbey of the Bl. Virgin Mary	2000/07/16	3	141
25	Es ist nichts Gesundes an meinem Leibe	Trinity 14	Ambronay, Abbaye d'Ambronay	2000/09/24	7	124
26	Ach wie flüchtig, ach wie nichtig	Trinity 24	Romsey, Romsey Abbey	2000/01/30	19	115
27	Wer weiß, wie nahe mir mein Ende	Trinity 16	Santiago de Compostela, Santo Domingo	2000/10/07	8	104
28	Gottlob! nun geht das Jahr zu Ende	Sunday after Christmas	New York, St. Bartholomew's	2000/12/31	16	137
29	Wir danken dir, Gott, wir danken dir	Leipzig Council election	not part of the BCP project			
30	Freue dich, erlöste Schar	St. John the Baptist	London, St. Giles Cripplegate	2000/06/24	1	101
31	Der Himmel lacht! die Erde jubilieret	Easter	Eisenach, Georgenkirche	2000/04/23	22	128
32	Liebster Jesu, mein Verlangen	Epiphany 1	—	2000/01/09	18	174
33	Allein zu dir, Herr Jesu Christ	Trinity 13	Frankfurt, Dreikönigskirche	2000/09/17	6	134
34	O ewiges Feuer, o Ursprung der Liebe	Whit Sunday (Pentecost)	Long Melford, Holy Trinity	2000/06/11	26	121
35	Geist und Seele wird verwirret	Trinity 12	Köthen, Jakobskirche	2000/09/10	6	134
36	Schwingt freudig euch empor	Advent 1	—	2000/12/03	13	162
37	Wer da gläubet und getauft wird	Ascension Day	—	2000/06/01	N/A	N/A
38	Aus tiefer Not schrei ich zu dir	Trinity 21	—	2000/11/12	11	168
39	Brich dem Hungrigen dein Brot	Trinity 01	London, St. Giles Cripplegate	2000/06/25	1	101
40	Darzu ist erschienen der Sohn Gottes	Christmas 2 (St. Stephanus)	New York, St. Bartholomew's	2000/12/25	14	113
41	Jesu, nun sei gepreiset	Feast of the Circumcision	Berlin, Gethsemanekirche	2000/01/01	17	150
42	Am Abend aber desselbigen Sabbats	Quasimodogeniti	Arnstadt, Johann-Sebastian-Bach-Kirche	2000/04/30	23	131
43	Gott fähret auf mit Jauchzen	Ascension Day	—	2000/06/01	N/A	N/A
44	Sie werden euch in den Bann tun	Exaudi	Sherborne, Abbey Ch. of St Mary, Virgin	2000/06/04	25	144
45	Es ist dir gesagt, Mensch, was gut ist	Trinity 08	Rendsburg, Christkirche	2000/08/13	5	147
46	Schauet doch und sehet, ob irgend ein Schmerz sei	Trinity 10	Braunschweig, Braunschweig Cathedral	2000/08/27	5	147
47	Wer sich selbst erhöhet, der soll ...	Trinity 17	Lund, Allhelgonakyrkan	2000/10/14	9	159
48	Ich elender Mensch, wer wird mich erlösen	Trinity 19	Potsdam, Erlöserkirche	2000/10/29	10	110
49	Ich geh und suche mit Verlangen	Trinity 20	—	2000/11/05	11	168
50	Nun ist das Heil und die Kraft	Michaelmas Day	Bremen, Unser Lieben Frauen	2000/09/29	7	124
51	Jauchzet Gott in allen Landen	Trinity 15	Bremen, Unser Lieben Frauen	2000/09/28	8	104
52	Falsche Welt, dir trau ich nicht!	Trinity 23	—	2000/11/26	12	171
53	Schlage doch, gewünschte Stunde	Funeral service	not part of the BCP project (spurious)			
54	Widerstehe doch der Sünde	Oculi	Walpole, St Peter's Church (Norfolk)	2000/03/26	21	118
55	Ich armer Mensch, ich Sündenknecht	Trinity 22	—	2000/11/19	12	171
56	Ich will den Kreuzstab gerne tragen	Trinity 19	Potsdam, Erlöserkirche	2000/10/29	10	110
57	Selig ist der Mann	Christmas 2 (St. Stephanus)	New York, St. Bartholomew's	2000/12/27	15	127
58	Ach Gott, wie manches Herzeleid	Sunday after New Year's Day	Berlin, Gethsemanekirche	2000/01/02	17	150
59	Wer mich liebet, der wird mein Wort halten	Whit Sunday (Pentecost)	Long Melford, Holy Trinity	2000/06/11	26	121
60	O Ewigkeit, du Donnerwort	Trinity 24	—	—	12	171
61	Nun komm, der Heiden Heiland	Advent 1	—	2000/12/03	13	162
62	Nun komm, der Heiden Heiland	Advent 1	—	2000/12/03	13	162
63	Christen, ätzet diesen Tag	Christmas	—	2000/12/25	18	174
64	Sehet, welch eine Liebe hat uns der Vater erzeiget	Christmas 3 (St John)	New York, St. Bartholomew's	2000/12/27	15	127
65	Sie werden aus Saba alle kommen	Epiphany	—	2000/01/06	18	174
66	Erfreut euch, ihr Herzen	Easter Monday (Angelus)	Eisenach, Georgenkirche	2000/04/24	22	128
67	Halt im Gedächtnis Jesum Christ	Quasimodogeniti	Arnstadt, Johann-Sebastian-Bach-Kirche	2000/04/30	23	131
68	Also hat Gott die Welt geliebt	Whit Monday	Long Melford, Holy Trinity	2000/06/12	26	121
69	Lobe den Herrn, meine Seele	Trinity 12	Köthen, Jakobskirche	2000/09/10	6	134
70	Wachet! betet! betet! wachet!	Trinity 26	—	—	13	162
71	Gott ist mein König	Mühlhausen council inauguration	Mühlhausen, Divi Blasii	2000/07/23	3	141
72	Alles nur nach Gottes Willen	Epiphany 3	on Archiv 463 582-2	2000/01/23	N/A	N/A
73	Herr, wie du willt, so schicks mit mir	Epiphany 3	on Archiv 463 582-2	2000/01/23	N/A	N/A
74	Wer mich liebet, der wird mein Wort halten	Whit Sunday (Pentecost)	Long Melford, Holy Trinity	2000/06/11	26	121
75	Die Elenden sollen essen	Trinity 01	London, St. Giles Cripplegate	2000/06/25	1	101
76	Die Himmel erzählen die Ehre Gottes	Trinity 02	—	2000/07/02	2	165
77	Du sollt Gott, deinen Herren, lieben	Trinity 13	Frankfurt, Dreikönigskirche	2000/09/17	6	134
78	Jesu, der du meine Seele	Trinity 14	Ambronay, Abbaye d'Ambronay	2000/09/24	7	124
79	Gott der Herr ist Sonn und Schild	Feast of the Reformation	Wittenberg, Schlosskirche	2000/10/31	10	110
80	Ein feste Burg ist unser Gott	Feast of the Reformation	Wittenberg, Schlosskirche	2000/10/31	10	110
81	Jesus schläft, was soll ich hoffen?	Epiphany 4	Romsey, Romsey Abbey	2000/01/30	19	115
82	Ich habe genug	Purification of Mary	on Archiv 463 585-2	2000/02/01	N/A	N/A
83	Erfreute Zeit im neuen Bunde	Purification of Mary	on Archiv 463 585-2	2000/02/01	N/A	N/A
84	Ich bin vergnügt mit meinem Glücke	Septuagesima	Grote Kerk, Naarden	2000/02/20	20	153
85	Ich bin ein guter Hirt	Misericordias Domini	Echternach, St. Willibrord	2000/05/07	23	131
86	Wahrlich, wahrlich, ich sage euch	Rogate	Dresden, Annenkirche	2000/05/28	25	144
87	Bisher habt ihr nichts gebeten in meinem Namen	Rogate	Dresden, Annenkirche	2000/05/28	25	144
88	Siehe, ich will viel Fischer aussenden	Trinity 05	Mühlhausen, Blasiuskirche	2000/07/23	3	141
89	Was soll ich aus dir machen, Ephraim	Trinity 22	—	2000/11/19	12	171
90	Es reißet euch ein schrecklich Ende	Trinity 25	Potsdam, Erlöserkirche	2000/10/29	10	110
91	Gelobet seist du, Jesu Christ	Christmas	New York, St. Bartholomew's	2000/12/25	14	113
92	Ich hab in Gottes Herz und Sinn	Septuagesima	Grote Kerk, Naarden	2000/02/20	20	153
93	Wer nur den lieben Gott läßt walten	Trinity 05	Mühlhausen, Blasiuskirche	2000/07/23	3	141
94	Was frag ich nach der Welt	Trinity 09	on Archiv 463 590-2	2000/08/20	N/A	N/A
95	Christus, der ist mein Leben	Trinity 16	Santiago de Compostela, Santo Domingo	2000/10/07	8	104
96	Herr Christ, der einge Gottessohn	Trinity 18	Leipzig, Thomaskirche	2000/10/22	9	159
97	In allen meinen Taten	unspecified	Dresden, Annenkirche	2000/05/28	25	144
98	Was Gott tut, das ist wohlgetan	Trinity 21	—	2000/11/12	11	168
99	Was Gott tut, das ist wohlgetan	Trinity 15	Bremen, Unser Lieben Frauen	2000/09/28	8	104
100	Was Gott tut, das ist wohlgetan	Trinity 15 & 21	Bremen, Unser Lieben Frauen	2000/09/28	8	104
101	Nimm von uns, Herr, du treuer Gott	Trinity 10	Braunschweig, Braunschweig Cathedral	2000/08/27	5	147
102	Herr, deine Augen sehen nach dem Glauben	Trinity 10	Braunschweig, Braunschweig Cathedral	2000/08/27	5	147
103	Ihr werdet weinen und heulen	Jubilate	Altenburg, Schlosskirche	2000/05/14	24	107
104	Du Hirte Israel, höre	Misericordias Domini	Echternach, St. Willibrord	2000/05/07	23	131
105	Herr, gehe nicht ins Gericht mit deinem Knecht	Trinity 09	on Archiv 463 590-2	2000/08/20	N/A	N/A
106	Gottes Zeit ist die allerbeste Zeit	Funeral service	not part of the BCP project			
107	Was willst du dich betrüben	Trinity 07	—	2000/08/06	4	156
108	Es ist euch gut, daß ich hingehe	Cantate	Warwick, St. Mary's	2000/05/21	24	107
109	Ich glaube, lieber Herr, hilf meinem Unglauben	Trinity 21	—	2000/11/12	11	168
110	Unser Mund sei voll Lachens	Christmas	New York, St. Bartholomew's	2000/12/25	14	113
111	Was mein Gott will, das g'scheh allzeit	Epiphany 3	on Archiv 463 582-2	2000/01/23	N/A	N/A
112	Der Herr ist mein getreuer Hirt	Misericordias Domini	Echternach, St. Willibrord	2000/05/07	23	131
113	Herr Jesu Christ, du höchstes Gut	Trinity 11	on Archiv 463 591-2	2000/09/03	N/A	N/A
114	Ach, lieben Christen, seid getrost	Trinity 17	Lund, Allhelgonakyrkan	2000/10/14	9	159
115	Mache dich, mein Geist, bereit	Trinity 22	—	2000/11/19	12	171
116	Du Friedefürst, Herr Jesu Christ	Trinity 25	Leipzig, Thomaskirche	2000/10/22	9	159
117	Sei Lob und Ehr dem höchsten Gut	Misericordias Domini	Warwick, St. Mary's	2000/05/21	24	107
118	O Jesu Christ, meins Lebens Licht	Funeral service	not part of the BCP project			
119	Preise, Jerusalem, den Herrn	Leipzig council election	not part of the BCP project			
120	Gott, man lobet dich in der Stille	Leipzig council election	not part of the BCP project			
121	Christum wir sollen loben schon	Christmas 2 (St. Stephanus)	New York, St. Bartholomew's	2000/12/25	14	113
122	Das neugeborne Kindelein	Sunday after Christmas	New York, St. Bartholomew's	2000/12/31	16	137
123	Liebster Immanuel, Herzog der Frommen	Epiphany	—	2000/01/06	18	174
124	Meinen Jesum laß ich nicht	Epiphany 1	—	2000/01/09	18	174
125	Mit Fried und Freud ich fahr dahin	Purification of Mary	on Archiv 463 585-2	2000/02/02	N/A	N/A
126	Erhalt uns, Herr, bei deinem Wort	Sexagesima	Nottinghamshire, Southwell Minster	2000/02/27	20	153
127	Herr Jesu Christ, wahr' Mensch und Gott	Quinquagesima	Cambridge, King's College Chapel	2000/03/05	21	118
128	Auf Christi Himmelfahrt allein	Ascension Day	not part of the BCP project			
129	Gelobet sei der Herr, mein Gott	Trinity	Kirkwall, St. Magnus Cathedral	2000/06/18	27	138
130	Herr Gott, dich loben alle wir	Michaelmas Day	Bremen, Unser Lieben Frauen	2000/09/29	7	124
131	Aus der Tiefen rufe ich, Herr, zu dir	Trinity 05	Mühlhausen, Blasiuskirche	2000/07/23	3	141
132	Bereitet die Wege, bereitet die Bahn	Advent 4	—	2000/12/24	13	162
133	Ich freue mich in dir	Christmas 3 (St John)	New York, St. Bartholomew's	2000/12/27	15	127
134	Ein Herz, das seinen Jesum lebend weiß	Easter Tuesday	Eisenach, Georgenkirche	2000/04/25	22	128
135	Ach Herr, mich armen Sünder	Trinity 03	—	2000/07/09	2	165
136	Erforsche mich, Gott, und erfahre mein Herz	Trinity 08	Rendsburg, Christkirche	2000/08/13	5	147
137	Lobe den Herren, den mächtigen König der Ehren	Trinity 12	Köthen, Jakobskirche	2000/09/10	6	134
138	Warum betrübst du dich, mein Herz	Trinity 15	Bremen, Unser Lieben Frauen	2000/09/28	8	104
139	Wohl dem, der sich auf seinen Gott	Trinity 23	—	2000/11/26	12	171
140	Wachet auf, ruft uns die Stimme, BWV 140	Trinity 27	—	—	12	171
141	Das ist je gewisslich wahr (spurious)	Advent 3	not part of the BCP project			
142	Uns ist ein Kind geboren (spurious)	Christmas	not part of the BCP project			
143	Lobe den Herrn, meine Seele II	Feast of the Circumcision	Berlin, Gethsemanekirche	2000/01/01	17	150
144	Nimm, was dein ist, und gehe hin	Septuagesima	Grote Kerk, Naarden	2000/02/20	20	153
145	Ich lebe, mein Herze, zu deinem Ergötzen	Easter Tuesday	Eisenach, Georgenkirche	2000/04/25	22	128
146	Wir müssen durch viel Trübsal	Jubilate	Altenburg, Schlosskirche	2000/05/14	24	107
147	Herz und Mund und Tat und Leben	Feast of the Visitation	—	2000/07/02	13	162
148	Bringet dem Herrn Ehre seines Namens	Trinity 17	Lund, Allhelgonakyrkan	2000/10/14	9	159
149	Man singet mit Freuden vom Sieg	Michaelmas Day	Bremen, Unser Lieben Frauen	2000/09/29	7	124
150	Nach dir, Herr, verlanget mich	Exaudi	Sherborne, Abbey Ch. of St Mary, Virgin	2000/06/04	25	144
151	Süßer Trost, mein Jesus kömmt	Christmas 3 (St John)	New York, St. Bartholomew's	2000/12/27	15	127
152	Tritt auf die Glaubensbahn	Sunday after Christmas	New York, St. Bartholomew's	2000/12/31	16	137
153	Schau, lieber Gott, wie meine Feind	Feast of the Circumcision	Berlin, Gethsemanekirche	2000/01/02	17	150
154	Mein liebster Jesus ist verloren	Epiphany 1	—	2000/01/09	18	174
155	Mein Gott, wie lang, ach lange? (1724 version)	Epiphany 2	Greenwich, Old Royal Naval College Chpl.	2000/01/16	19	115
156	Ich steh mit einem Fuß im Grabe	Epiphany 3	on Archiv 463 582-2	2000/01/23	N/A	N/A
157	Ich lasse dich nicht, du segnest mich denn	Purification of Mary	not part of the BCP project			
158	Der Friede sei mit dir	Easter Tuesday	Arnstadt, Johann-Sebastian-Bach-Kirche	2000/04/30	23	131
159	Sehet! Wir gehn hinauf gen Jerusalem	Quinquagesima	Cambridge, King's College Chapel	2000/03/05	21	118
160	Ich weiß, daß mein Erlöser lebt (spurious)	Easter	not part of the BCP project			
161	Komm, du süße Todesstunde	Trinity 16	Santiago de Compostela, Santo Domingo	2000/10/07	8	104
162	Ach! ich sehe, itzt, da ich zur Hochzeit gehe	Trinity 20	—	2000/11/20	11	168
163	Nur jedem das Seine	Trinity 23	—	2000/11/26	12	171
164	Ihr, die ihr euch von Christo nennet	Trinity 13	Frankfurt, Dreikönigskirche	2000/09/17	6	134
165	O heilges Geist- und Wasserbad	Trinity	Kirkwall, St. Magnus Cathedral	2000/06/18	27	138
166	Wo gehest du hin?	Cantate	Warwick, St. Mary's	2000/05/21	24	107
167	Ihr Menschen, rühmet Gottes Liebe	St. John the Baptist	London, St. Giles Cripplegate	2000/06/24	1	101
168	Tue Rechnung! Donnerwort	Trinity 09	on Archiv 463 590-2	2000/08/20	N/A	N/A
169	Gott soll allein mein Herze haben	Trinity 18	Leipzig, Thomaskirche	2000/10/22	9	159
170	Vergnügte Ruh, beliebte Seelenlust	Trinity 06	—	2000/07/30	4	156
171	Gott, wie dein Name, so ist auch dein Ruhm	Feast of the Circumcision	Berlin, Gethsemanekirche	2000/01/01	17	150
172	Erschallet, ihr Lieder	Whit Sunday (Pentecost)	Long Melford, Holy Trinity	2000/06/11	26	121
173	Erhöhtes Fleisch und Blut	Whit Monday	Long Melford, Holy Trinity	2000/06/12	26	121
174	Ich liebe den Höchsten von ganzem Gemüte	Whit Monday	Long Melford, Holy Trinity	2000/06/12	26	121
175	Er rufet seinen Schafen mit Namen	Whit Tuesday	Blythburgh, Holy Trinity	2000/06/13	27	138
176	Es ist ein trotzig und verzagt Ding	Trinity	Kirkwall, St. Magnus Cathedral	2000/06/18	27	138
177	Ich ruf zu dir, Herr Jesu Christ	Trinity 04	Tewkesbury, Abbey of the Bl. Virgin Mary	2000/07/16	3	141
178	Wo Gott der Herr nicht bei uns hält	Trinity 08	Rendsburg, Christkirche	2000/08/13	5	147
179	Siehe zu, daß deine Gottesfurcht nicht Heuchelei sei	Trinity 11	on Archiv 463 591-2	2000/09/03	N/A	N/A
180	Schmücke dich, o liebe Seele	Trinity 20	—	2000/11/05	11	168
181	Leichtgesinnte Flattergeister	Sexagesima	Nottinghamshire, Southwell Minster	2000/02/27	20	153
182	Himmelskönig, sei willkommen	Palm Sunday	Walpole, St Peter's Church (Norfolk)	2000/03/26	21	118
183	Sie werden euch in den Bann tun	Exaudi	Sherborne, Abbey Ch. of St Mary, Virgin	2000/06/04	25	144
184	Erwünschtes Freudenlicht	Whit Tuesday	Blythburgh, Holy Trinity	2000/06/13	27	138
185	Barmherziges Herze der ewigen Liebe	Trinity 04	Tewkesbury, Abbey of the Bl. Virgin Mary	2000/07/16	3	141
186	Ärgre dich, o Seele, nicht	Trinity 07	—	2000/08/06	4	156
187	Es wartet alles auf dich	Trinity 07	—	2000/08/06	4	156
188	Ich habe meine Zuversicht	Trinity 21	—	2000/11/12	11	168
189	Meine Seele rühmt und preist (spurious)	unspecified	not part of the BCP project			
190	Singet dem Herrn ein neues Lied	Feast of the Circumcision	New York, St. Bartholomew's	2000/12/31	16	137
191	Gloria in excelsis Deo	Christmas	Weimar		18	174
192	Nun danket alle Gott	Feast of the Reformation	Wittenberg, Schlosskirche	2000/10/31	10	110
193	Ihr Tore zu Zion	Secular cantata	not part of the BCP project			
194	Höchsterwünschtes Freudenfest	Trinity	Kirkwall, St. Magnus Cathedral	2000/06/18	27	138
195	Dem Gerechten muss das Licht	Wedding ceremony	not part of the BCP project			
196	Der Herr denket an uns	Wedding ceremony	not part of the BCP project			
197	Gott ist unsre Zuversicht	Wedding ceremony	not part of the BCP project			
198	Laß, Fürstin, laß noch einen Strahl	Secular cantata	not part of the BCP project			
199	Mein Herze schwimmt im Blut	Trinity 11	on Archiv 463 591-2	2000/09/03	N/A	N/A
200	Bekennen will ich seinen Namen	Purification of Mary	on Archiv 463 585-2	2000/02/02	N/A	N/A
201	Geschwinde, ihr wirbelnden Winde	Secular cantata	not part of the BCP project			
217	Gedenke, Herr, wie es uns gehet!	Epiphany 1	—	2000/01/09	18	174
225	Singet dem Herrn ein neues Lied	New Year's Day	New York, St. Bartholomew's	2000/12/31	16	137
226	Der Geist hilft unser Schwachheit auf	Funeral Service	Lund, Allhelgonakyrkan	2000/10/14	9	159
227	Jesu, meine Freude	Funeral service	Romsey, Romsey Abbey	2000/01/30	19	115
668	Vor deinen Thron tret ich hiermit	—	Leipzig, Thomaskirche	2000/10/22	9	159

== Discography ==
All recordings mentioned are with the English Baroque Soloists or Orchestre Révolutionnaire et Romantique, conducted by Sir John Eliot Gardiner, unless otherwise stated.

=== Johann Sebastian Bach ===
==== Cantatas ====
- Easter Cantatas: BWV 6, BWV 66 — 2000 — Archiv Produktion 463 580-2
- Cantatas: BWV 106, BWV 118/BWV 231, BWV 198 — 1990 — Archiv Produktion 463 581-2
- Cantatas for the 3rd Sunday after Epiphany: BWV 72, BWV 73, BWV 111, BWV 156 — 2000 — Archiv Produktion 463 582-2( recorded live on the Bach Cantata Pilgrimage, Milan, January 2000)
- Cantatas for Ascension Day: BWV 43, BWV 128, BWV 37, BWV 11 — 2000 — Archiv Produktion 463 583-2
- Whitsun Cantatas: BWV 172, BWV 59, BWV 74, BWV 34 — 2000 — Archiv Produktion 463 584-2
- Cantatas for the Feast of the Purification of Mary: BWV 83, BWV 82, BWV 125, BWV 200 — 2000 — Archiv Produktion 463 585-2 (recorded live on the Bach Cantata Pilgrimage, Christchurch, February 2000)
- Cantatas: BWV 98, BWV 139, BWV 16 — 2000 — Archiv Produktion 463 586-2
- Cantatas: BWV 140, BWV 147 — 1992 — Archiv Produktion 463 587-2
- Advent Cantatas: BWV 61, BWV 36, BWV 62 — 1992 — Archiv Produktion 463 588-2
- Christmas Cantatas: BWV 63, BWV 64, BWV 121, BWV 133 — 2000 — Archiv Produktion 463 589-2
- Cantatas for the 9th Sunday after Trinity: BWV 94, BWV 168, BWV 105 — 2000 — Archiv Produktion 463 590-2 (recorded live on the Bach Cantata Pilgrimage, Merano, August 2000)
- Cantatas for the 11th Sunday after Trinity: BWV 179, BWV 199, BWV 113 — 2000 — Archiv Produktion 463 591-2 (recorded live on the Bach Cantata Pilgrimage, St Davids, September 2000)
- Cantatas for the 2nd Sunday after Epiphany: BWV 155, BWV 3, BWV 13 and Cantatas for the 4th Sunday after Epiphany: BWV BWV 81, BWV 14, BWV 26, Motet BWV 227 (2 CDs) — 2005 — SDG 115
- Cantatas for the Feast of St. John the Baptist: BWV 167, BWV 7, BWV 30 and Cantatas for the 1st Sunday after Trinity: BWV 75, BWV 20, BWV 39 (2 CDs) — 2005 — SDG 101
- Cantatas for the 15th Sunday after Trinity: BWV 138, BWV 99, BWV 51, BWV 100 and Cantatas for the 16th Sunday after Trinity: BWV 161, BWV 27, BWV 8, BWV 95 (2 CDs) —2005 — SDG 104
- Cantatas for the 3rd Sunday after Easter (Jubilate): BWV 12, BWV 103, BWV 146 and Cantatas for the 4th Sunday after Easter: BWV 166, BWV 108, BWV 117 (2 CDs) — 2005 — SDG 107
- Cantatas for the 19th Sunday after Trinity: BWV 48, BWV 5, BWV 90, BWV 56 and Cantatas for the Feast of the Reformation: BWV 79, BWV 192, BWV 80 (2 CDs) — 2005 — SDG 110
- Alles mit Gott, BWV 1127 & Arias and Choruses from Cantatas BWV 71, BWV 78, BWV 151, BWV 155, BWV 159, BWV 182, BWV 190 — 2005 — SDG 114
- Cantatas for the Christmas Day & for the 2nd day of Christmas: BWV 91, BWV 121, BWV 40, BWV 110 — 2005 — SDG 113

==== Other works ====
- Mass in B minor, BWV 232 — 1985 — Archiv Produktion 415 514-2
- St Matthew Passion, BWV 244 — 1989 — Archiv Produktion 427 648-2
- St John Passion, BWV 245 — 1986 — Archiv Produktion 419 324-2
- Magnificat, BWV 243 and Cantata BWV 51 (with Emma Kirkby) — 1985 — Philips Classics 464 672-2

=== Other composers ===
==== Claudio Monteverdi ====
- Vespro della Beata Vergine (with the Monteverdi Orchestra) — 1975 — Decca SET 593-4
- Vespro della Beata Vergine and Magnificat a sei voci — 1990 — Archiv Produktion 429 565-2
- Vespro della Beata Vergine and motets by Giovanni Gabrieli, Giovanni Bassano & Claudio Monteverdi (2 CDs) — 1994 — Decca

==== Alessandro Scarlatti ====
- Stabat Mater — 2020 — Erato OCLC 1154312842

==== Antonio Vivaldi ====
- Gloria in D major, RV 589 — 2001 — Philips Classics 462 597-2

==== George Frideric Handel ====
- Messiah — 1982 — Philips Classics 411 041-2
- Dixit Dominus —2001 — Philips Classics 462 597-2
- Semele (live) — 2019 — SDG733

==== Christoph Willibald Gluck ====
- Orfeo ed Euridice — 1993 — Philips Classics 434 093-2

==== Joseph Haydn ====
- Die Jahreszeiten (The Seasons), Hob. XXI:3 — 1992 — Archiv Produktion 431 818-2
- Die Schöpfung (The Creation), Hob. XXI:2 — 1996 — Archiv Produktion 449 217-2

==== Wolfgang Amadeus Mozart ====
- Requiem, KV 626 and Kyrie in D minor, KV 341 — 1986 — Philips Classics
- Great Mass in C minor, "Great" Mass, K. 427 — 1986 — Philips Classics
- Idomeneo — 1991 — Archiv Produktion 431 674-2
- La clemenza di Tito — 1991 — Archiv Produktion 431 806-2
- Die Entführung aus dem Serail — 1992 — Archiv Produktion 435 857-2
- Così fan tutte — 1993 — Archiv Produktion 437 829-2
- Le Nozze di Figaro — 1994 — Archiv Produktion 439 871-2
- Don Giovanni — 1995 — Archiv Produktion 445 870-2
- Die Zauberflöte — 1996 — Archiv Produktion 449 166-2

==== Ludwig van Beethoven ====
- Missa Solemnis, op. 123 — 1990 — Archiv Produktion 429 779-2
- Messe in C, op. 86, "Ah! perfido - Per pietà", op. 65, Meeresstille und glückliche Fahrt, op. 112 — 1992 — Archiv Produktion 435 391-2
- Ninth Symphony, op. 125 — 1994 — Archiv Produktion 447 074-2
- Piano Concerto No. 5, op. 73, Choral Fantasy, op. 80 — 1996 — Archiv Produktion 447 771-2
- Leonore — 1997 — Archiv Produktion 453 461-2

==== Carl Maria von Weber ====
- Oberon - 2005 - Philips Classics 4756563

==== Franz Schubert ====
- Mass in A flat, D. 678, Hymnus an den Heiligen Geist, D. 948, Psalm 92, D. 953: Lied für den Sabbath, Stabat mater, D. 175 - 1999 - Philips Classics 456 578-2

==== Hector Berlioz ====
- Messe solennelle — 1994 — Philips Classics 442 137-2
- Harold en Italie, Tristia — 1996 — Philips Classics 446 676-2
- Roméo et Juliette — 1998 — Philips Classics 289 454 454-2

==== Robert Schumann ====
- Das Paradies und die Peri, Requiem für Mignon, Nachtlied — 1999 — Archiv Produktion 457 660-2

==== Giuseppe Verdi ====
- Requiem, Quattro pezzi sacri — 1995 — Philips Classics 442 142-2
- Falstaff — 2001 — Philips Classics 462 603-2

==== Johannes Brahms ====
- Ein deutsches Requiem, op. 45 - 1991 - Philips Classics 432 140-2

==== Other recordings ====
- Once As I Remember... (Christmas music) — 1998 — Philips 462050
- Music of the Chapels Royal (music by Henry Purcell, Matthew Locke, John Blow, and Pelham Humfrey) — 2002 — apex 0927 44352 2
- Membra Jesu Nostri by Buxtehude and O bone Jesu, fili Mariae (SWV 471), a Sacred concerto by Schütz — Archiv Produktion 447 298-2
- Baroque Christmas, Messe de minuit H.9, In nativitatem Domini canticum H.416, Noëls sur les instruments H.531 & H.534 by Marc-Antoine Charpentier conducted by Christophe Rousset (Monteverdi productions ltd. SDG737. 2025).
