= Bartholomäus Ringwaldt =

16th century German poet and theologian

Bartholomäus Ringwaldt (c. 1530 – probably May 9, 1599) was a German didactic poet and Lutheran pastor. He is most recognized as a hymnwriter.

== Biography ==
Bartholomäus Ringwaldt was born in Frankfort-on-the-Oder, Germany. From 1543, he studied theology. After graduating, he first started his career as a teacher. He was ordained into the Lutheran Ministry during 1557 and served as pastor of two parishes. In 1566, he became the pastor of Langenfeld, Neumark. Starting during the 1570s, he wrote songs and poems which focused on his religious and theological beliefs. Ringwaldt was a prolific hymnist, and may have composed tunes as well.

Bartholomäus Ringwaldt died probably May 9, 1599 in Langenfeld, today Długoszyn near Sulęcin, Poland.

== Hymns ==
Ringwaldt's hymns include:

- "Herr Jesu Christ, du höchstes Gut" ("Lord Jesus Christ, you highest good"). As well as writing the words, Ringwaldt may have written the anonymous tune. This chorale is the basis for Johann Sebastian Bach's chorale cantata Herr Jesu Christ, du höchstes Gut, BWV 113 (1724). Bach, who frequently used hymn stanzas in his church cantatas, used verses from the same chorale in Aus der Tiefen rufe ich, Herr, zu dir, BWV 131 (1707/08), and Tue Rechnung! Donnerwort, BWV 168.
- "Herr Jesu Christ, ich weiß gar wohl" ("Lord Jesus Christ, I know very well"). Bach used a stanza in Wo gehest du hin? BWV 166.
- "Gott Heil'ger Geist, hilf uns mit Grund" (1581), translated into English as O Holy Spirit, grant us grace by Oluf H. Smeby for "The Lutheran Hymnal", 1909
- "Es ist gewisslich an der Zeit" (ca, 1565), translated into English as The day is surely drawing near by Philip A. Peter for the "Ohio Lutheran Hymnal", 1880.
