= Herr Jesu Christ, du höchstes Gut =

Beginning of two Lutheran hymns

"Herr Jesu Christ, du höchstes Gut, du Brunnquell aller Gnaden"
- Lutheran hymn
- English: Lord Jesus Christ, you highest good, you fountain of all mercy
- Catalogue: Zahn 4486
- Text: by Bartholomäus Ringwaldt
- Language: German
- Published: 1588

"Herr Jesu Christ, du höchstes Gut, der du uns hast geladen"
- Lutheran hymn
- English: Lord Jesus Christ, you highest good, who invited us
- Occasion: communion
- Language: German
- Published: 1713

"Herr Jesu Christ, du höchstes Gut" (Lord Jesus Christ, you highest good) is the beginning of two Lutheran hymns. One is a penitential hymn, written in 1588 by Bartholomäus Ringwaldt, who possibly also created the melody. The other is an anonymous communion hymn, probably based on the former, which appeared first in 1713. Johann Sebastian Bach's used the penitential hymn several times, including the chorale cantata Herr Jesu Christ, du höchstes Gut, BWV 113, based on the hymn.

== History ==
=== Penitential hymn ===
Bartholomäus Ringwaldt wrote the lyrics of the penitential hymn in 1588, and possibly also created the melody. He wrote eight stanzas, beginning "Herr Jesu Christ, du höchstes Gut, du Brunnquell aller Gnaden" (Lord Jesus Christ, you highest good, you fountain of all mercy).

=== Communion hymn ===
An anonymous poet, who was probably inspired by Ringwaldt's song, wrote a communion hymn of three stanzas, beginning "Herr Jesu Christ, du höchstes Gut, der du uns hast geladen" (Lord Jesus Christ, you highest good, who invited us), taking not only the first line, but also the rhyme of the second from Ringwaldt's hymn. Its theology follows writing by Johann Arndt, who had written in Sechs Bücher vom wahren Christentum that God is good and the highest good, which can be tasted in his sacrament. The song appeared first in Chemnitz in 1713 in the hymnal Vollständiges Chemnitzer Gesangbuch. The melody refers to Ringwaldt's song.

This hymn is part of the Protestant hymnal Evangelisches Gesangbuch as EG 219.

== Musical settings ==
Alternative melodies for both songs are the one of "Aus tiefer Not schrei ich zu dir" and others during the 17th and 18th century.

Bach used several stanzas of the penitential hymn. His settings are based on the Zahn No. 4486 hymn tune, that is one of the melodies composed for "Wenn mein Stündlein vorhanden ist". Aus der Tiefen rufe ich, Herr, zu dir, BWV 131, one of his early cantatas as a setting of Psalm 130, contains two stanzas of the hymn which are juxtaposed in the manner of a chorale fantasia wand an aria. Bach used a stanza for Tue Rechnung! Donnerwort, BWV 168, and he based Herr Jesu Christ, du höchstes Gut, BWV 113, one of his chorale cantatas, on the complete but partly rephrased hymn. The chorale cantata was first performed on 20 August 1724, the eleventh Sunday after Trinity that year. Bach composed a chorale prelude, BWV 1114, which became part of the Neumeister Chorales, rediscovered in 1985 by Christoph Wolff.
