= Paul Matthen =

American singer

External audio
- You may hear Paul Matthen performing Johann Sebastian Bach's Magnificat in D major, BWV 243 with Robert Shaw conducting the RCA Victor Orchestra in 1947 Here on archive.org

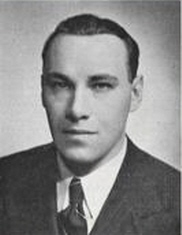
Paul Matthen (1914-2003)

Paul Seymour Matthen (1914-2003) was an American bass-baritone, musical scholar and music pedagogue. He attended Columbia University, where he studied chemistry in addition to music. While there he was a student of Friedrich Schorr.

== Career ==
Paul Matthen had a distinguished concert and operatic career, drawing much praise for his ability with opera, early music, and German Lieder. He performed with major symphony orchestras including that of the Boston Symphony, Cleveland, Philadelphia, and the National Symphony in D.C.

A leading bass-baritone at the Wurttembergishe Staatsoper for many years, he sang in operas directed by Wieland Wagner (grandson of Richard Wagner) as well as in Italian and French operas. In addition to regular appearances on national radio and television networks, he was soloist on the stages of Carnegie Hall, Town Hall, and was soloist at Radio City Music Hall for two years.

Matthen was twice offered contracts with the Metropolitan Opera, first in 1943 and again in 1950. He declined both offers due to preexisting contractual obligations, as well as for family reasons.

In 1954 he appeared as a soloist in the Spring Faculty Festival of the Longy School of Music of Bard College at Harvard University's Sanders Theater in Cambridge, Massachusts. He was featured in a performance of Jean-Philippe Rameau's cantata Aquilon et Orithie, RCT 23 as well as Hubert Lambs' love songs Innocentium Carmina which are based upon the medieval poetry collection Carmina Burana. Matthen was cited by the critics at The Harvard Crimson magazine for demonstrating tonal beauty while performing demanding vocal lines.

During the 1950s Matthen also recorded for the Vanguard Records label with the Collegium Musicum New York under the direction of Fritz Rikko. In addition, he recorded for RCA Victor with the Robert Shaw Chorale under the baton of Robert Shaw in a performance of Johann Sebastian Bach's Passion According to Saint John, BWV 245. He also recorded Bach's Magnificat in D major, BWV 243 and Bach's Mass in B Minor with Robert Shaw conducting the RCA Victor Chorale and Orchestra in 1947

External audio
- You may hear Paul Matthen performing Johann Sebastian Bach's Mass in B Minor with Robert Shaw conducting RCA Victor Orchestra and Chorale in 1947 Here on archive.org

Paul Matthen joined the faculty at the Indiana University School of Music in 1957 and remained at the university until his retirement in 1984.
