= Parable of the Unjust Steward =

Parable of Jesus

The Parable of the Unjust Steward or the Parable of the Penitent Steward is a parable of Jesus which appears in Luke 16:1–13. In it, a steward who is about to be fired tries to "curry favor" with his master's debtors by remitting some of their debts. The term "steward" is common in many English translations of the New Testament; some versions refer to a "manager", or an "accountant". This parable does not appear in the other gospels.

== Text ==
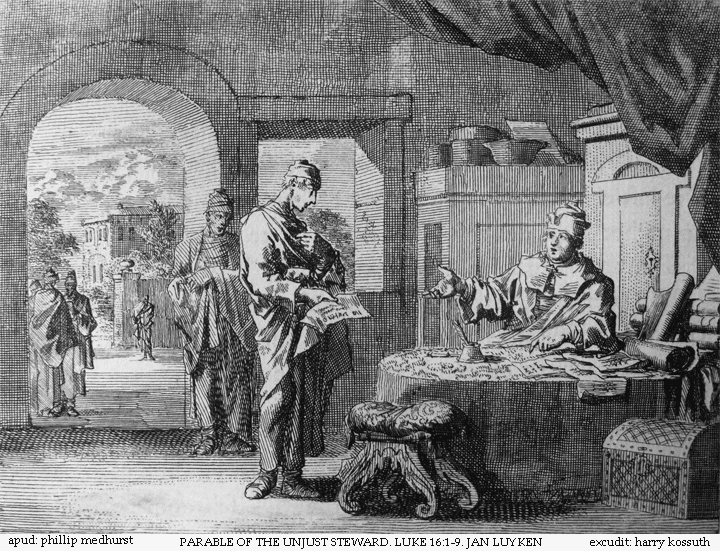
Jan Luyken etching of the parable of the unjust steward. Bowyer Bible.

Jesus also said to the disciples, "There was a rich man who had a manager, and charges were brought to him that this man was wasting his possessions. And he called him and said to him, 'What is this that I hear about you? Turn in the account of your management, for you can no longer be manager.' And the manager said to himself, 'What shall I do, since my master is taking the management away from me? I am not strong enough to dig, and I am ashamed to beg. I have decided what to do, so that when I am removed from management, people may receive me into their houses.' So, summoning his master's debtors one by one, he said to the first, 'How much do you owe my master?' He said, 'A hundred measures of oil.' He said to him 'Take your bill, and sit down quickly and write fifty.' Then he said to another, 'And how much do you owe?' He said, 'A hundred measures of wheat.' He said to him, 'Take your bill, and write eighty.' The master commended the dishonest manager for his shrewdness. For the sons of this world are more shrewd in dealing with their own generation than the sons of light. And I tell you, make friends for yourselves by means of unrighteous wealth, so that when it fails they may receive you into the eternal dwellings.

"One who is faithful in a very little is also faithful in much, and one who is dishonest in a very little is also dishonest in much. If then you have not been faithful in the unrighteous wealth, who will entrust to you the true riches? And if you have not been faithful in that which is another's, who will give you that which is your own? No servant can serve two masters, for either he will hate the one and love the other, or he will be devoted to the one and despise the other. You cannot serve God and money."

— Luke 16:1–13: English Standard Version, 2001

== Interpretation ==
Perhaps no parable in the gospels has been the subject of so much controversy as this. The parable, on the face of it, appears to be commending dishonest behaviour. One popular line of interpretation explains that the manager is forgoing a commission due to him personally, but many scholars disagree with this reading. Although the master has "a certain grudging admiration" for the manager's "shrewdness", Jesus labels the manager "dishonest". To add to the interpretations, several different sayings about money were attached to the parable here. It is a matter of debate whether sayings about trust or serving two masters apply to this parable.

The manager in the parable was probably a slave or freedman acting as his master's agent in business affairs. As his master's representative, the agreements he signs with the debtors were therefore binding.

The parable shares the theme of other passages where "Jesus counsels the disposition of possessions (and hospitality) on behalf of the poor with the understanding that, while mammon will vanish, eternal treasure will have thus been secured." When death comes, "the power we have to do good with our money ceases, so we should do good with it now" so that the friends we have made on earth will be waiting for us in heaven. This interpretation was also espoused by early Church writers, such as Asterius of Amasia:

When, therefore, any one anticipating his end and his removal to the next world, lightens the burden of his sins by good deeds, either by canceling the obligations of debtors, or by supplying the poor with abundance, by giving what belongs to the Lord, he gains many friends, who will attest his goodness before the Judge, and secure him by their testimony a place of happiness.

— Asterius of Amasia 1904, pp. 45–71

English Reformer William Tyndale emphasises the consistency of this parable with the doctrine of justification by faith, writing a booklet on the parable called The Parable of the Wicked Mammon (1528), based on an exposition by Martin Luther. Tyndale saw "good works" as the result of faith. Tyndale also pointed out that the steward was not praised by Jesus for his conduct, but merely provided as an example of wisdom and diligence, so that "we with righteousness should be as diligent to provide for our souls, as he with unrighteousness provided for his body". Anglican Charles Daubuz (1720) was among those who saw in the "eternal habitations" promised to the unjust steward a negative prediction of the grave, not a promise of heaven.

The Anglican theologian J. C. Ryle, writing in 1859, rejected a number of allegorical interpretations of the parable, and gave an interpretation similar to that of Tyndale:

Let us contend earnestly for the glorious doctrines of salvation by grace, and justification by faith. But let us never allow ourselves to suppose that true religion sanctions any trifling with the second table of the law. Let us never forget for a moment, that true faith will always be known by its fruits. We may be very sure that where there is no honesty, there is no grace.

— Ryle 1859, pp. 199-

David Flusser, in a book titled Jesus and the Dead Sea Scrolls, has taken the phrase "sons of light" to mean the Essenes; their closed economic system is contrasted with that of other people who were less strict.

A Confessional Lutheran apologist commented:

Jesus' parable of the unjust manager is one of the most striking in all the Gospels. Obviously, it would be pressing the parable beyond the point of comparison to interpret it as an endorsement of dishonest business practices. Jesus' point is simply to show us what money is really for. Typically we think of ourselves first when we answer that question. But Jesus invites us to realize that, first, our money isn't really ours – we're simply managing it for its real owner, God. Second, even "filthy lucre" can be pressed into the service of God and our neighbor. When it is, the benefits will last beyond this life – which the things we buy for ourselves won't. For example, money can be used to spread the Gospel, through which the Holy Spirit will gather believers into Christ's church. We will enjoy blessed fellowship with these believers forever, long after the money itself is gone.

LDS Elder James E. Talmage wrote:

It was not the steward's dishonesty that was extolled; his prudence and foresight were commended, however; for while he misapplied his master's substance, he gave relief to the debtors; and in so doing he did not exceed his legal powers, for he was still steward though he was morally guilty of malfeasance. The lesson may be summed up in this wise: [...] Be diligent; for the day in which you can use your earthly riches will soon pass. Take a lesson from even the dishonest and the evil; if they are so prudent as to provide for the only future they think of, how much more should you, who believe in an eternal future, provide therefor! If you have not learned wisdom and prudence in the use of 'unrighteous mammon,' how can you be trusted with the more enduring riches?

According to commentators of the New American Bible Revised Edition, the parable is about an agent who, knowing he is about to be fired for usury, repents of his sin, asking the debtors to only pay what they owe his master, rather than pay him as well.

== See also ==
- Life of Jesus in the New Testament
- Luke 16
- Ministry of Jesus
