= James Gilchrist (tenor) =

British tenor singer

James Gilchrist is a British tenor specialising in recital and oratorio singing.

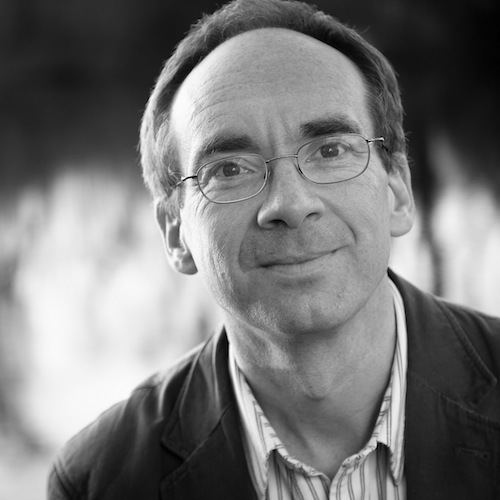

== Biography ==
Gilchrist was born in Banbury, Oxfordshire on 29 April 1966. He became a treble in the Choir of New College, Oxford and a choral scholar in the Choir of King's College, Cambridge. He trained as a doctor, turning to a full-time music career in 1996. He now lives in Gloucestershire with his wife and three children.

Gilchrist is the president of Mindsong, a Gloucester-based charity that uses music therapy to work with dementia sufferers.

== Music ==
A prolific recitalist, Gilchrist has appeared in many venues in the UK and abroad. His operatic repertoire includes roles in Handel's Acis and Galatea, Purcell's King Arthur and Vaughan Williams' Sir John in Love. He took part in the project of Ton Koopman and the Amsterdam Baroque Orchestra & Choir to record Bach's complete vocal works. In concert he has performed among others, Benjamin Britten's Serenade for Tenor, Horn and Strings with the Manchester Camerata and the Royal Northern Sinfonia, Elgar's The Dream of Gerontius with the Scottish Chamber Orchestra, Tippett's The Knot Garden with the BBC Symphony Orchestra and Sir Andrew Davis, Bach's Christmas Oratorio with the Zurich Tonhalle Orchestra under Koopman, the St Matthew Passion, at the Concertgebouw, Pulcinella with the Ensemble orchestral de Paris, and Die Jahreszeiten with the St. Louis Symphony Orchestra and with the Handel and Haydn Society at the BBC Proms.

== Discography ==
His extensive discography includes, for Stone Records, volumes 1 and 2 of the complete songs of Hugo Wolf, and for Chandos, the title role in Britten's Albert Herring, Amaryllus in Vaughan Williams's The Poisoned Kiss, songs by Grainger, the Mass in E-flat by Schubert and most recently songs by Lennox Berkeley. In 2008, he collaborated with Ailish Tynan (soprano) and David Owen Norris (piano) to record songs of early 20th-century composer Muriel Herbert for Linn Records.

== Sources ==
- Philip Campbell, "Messiah returns", Bay Area Reporter, 1 December 2005
- Bernard Holland, "Straight From the Joyous Heart and Soul, in a Setting the Composer Would Relish, New York Times, 29 December 2000
- Richard Morrison, "Vasari Singers/Backhouse", The Times, 16 May 2006
- James Oestreich, "'The Creation' An Early-Music Master Follows Haydn Way Back to the Beginning", New York Times, 19 October 2009
