= Antoine Marchand =

Antoine Marchand is a record label established in 2003 by the Dutch early music performer Ton Koopman. Antoine Marchand is the French translation of Ton Koopman. The label is distributed by Dutch Jazz and classics distributor Challenge.

Koopman brought his Bach cantata series to completion on Antoine Marchand after Erato Records was shuttered during the project.

== See also ==
- Soli Deo Gloria. Another "own label" involved with Bach cantatas.
