= Sytse Buwalda =

Dutch counter-tenor

- Born: 28 September 1965; Zuiderwoude

Sytse Buwalda (born 1965) is a Dutch counter-tenor.

== Life and career ==
Buwalda studied at the Sweelinck School of Music (Conservatorium van Amsterdam) in Amsterdam and has worked with conductors such as Frans Brüggen, Gustav Leonhardt, Sigiswald Kuijken and Sir David Willcocks. He was the alto soloist for most volumes of Pieter Jan Leusink's recording of the complete sacred cantatas of Johann Sebastian Bach. He embarked upon a successful tour of Japan with Max van Egmond, singing Bach solo cantatas, conducted by Masaaki Suzuki and Yoshio Watanabe. He also toured Holland with actress Ina van Faassen, putting on a production of Il Virtuoso, a theatrical play based upon the bestseller novel de Virtuoos by Margriet de Moor.
