= Late church cantatas by Johann Sebastian Bach =

Musical works

The late church cantatas by Johann Sebastian Bach are sacred cantatas he composed after his fourth cycle of 1728–29. Whether Bach still composed a full cantata cycle in the last 20 years of his life is not known, but the extant cantatas of this period written for occasions of the liturgical year are sometimes referred to as his fifth cycle, as, according to his obituary, he would have written five such cycles – inasmuch as such cantatas were not late additions to earlier cycles (e.g. chorale cantatas added to the chorale cantata cycle), or were adopted in his oratorios.

Other cantatas of this period were written for special occasions such as the 200th anniversary of the Augsburg Confession in June 1730, funerals and weddings. Some of the information and compositions of this period of writing and performing of cantatas are missing, leading to different ways of presenting and connecting what is known about them by Bach-scholars. For instance, in the 19th century Spitta considered almost all of Bach's chorale cantatas as late cantatas, while later research connected the large majority of them to the composer's second year in Leipzig (1724–25).

== Occasions of the liturgical year ==
Several groups can be discerned in Bach's cantata production after the Picander cycle:

- Chorale cantatas (see also Chorale cantata cycle § Chorale cantatas composed after Trinity 1725):
  - filling gaps in the chorale cantata cycle (the first two actually composed between the second and the 4th cycle):
    - BWV 137 (1725)
    - BWV 129 (1726)
    - BWV 112 (1731)
    - BWV 140 (1731)
    - BWV 177 (1732)
    - BWV 14 (1735)
    - BWV 9 (1734)
  - Cantatas for unknown occasions, probably for a wedding at first, possibly later reused for an occasion in the liturgical year, uncertain to which cycle they may have ultimately belonged:
    - BWV 117 (1728–31)
    - BWV 192 (1730)
    - BWV 97 (1734)
    - BWV 100 (c.1734–35)
- Possible later additions to the third cycle:
  - BWV 51 (1730)
  - BWV 30 (c.1738)
- Reuse of earlier material that else would only have received a single performance (or no performance at all):
  - BWV 157 (Purification): originally a funeral cantata (6 February 1727)
  - BWV 36 (First Sunday of Advent 1726–31): parody of BWV 36c (secular cantata, 1725)
  - BWV 248 VI a (Michaelmas 1734?): after first movement of BWV 1160 (secular cantata, 25 August 1731).
  - BWV 30 (Feast of St. John the Baptist c.1738): parody of the BWV 30a (secular cantata, 1737)
  - BWV 191 (Christmas 1742?): based on the otherwise probably unperformed Gloria of the Mass for the Dresden court, BWV 232 I (1733)

Bach's three extant oratorios also date from this period: the Christmas Oratorio (a set of six cantatas presented in the Christmas season of 1734–35), the Ascension Oratorio (1738?, with the dimensions of a single cantata) and the Easter Oratorio (an Easter cantata of 1725 with slight alterations reworked into an Oratorio c.1738).

Several earlier church cantatas were restaged after the period of the Picander cycle, some of them in a new version.

Bach had several students who produced church cantatas during their Leipzig formation years:

- Carl Philipp Emanuel and Doles provided settings of librettos from the Picander cycle of 1728–29
- Around 1745–46 Bach helped copy out performance parts of a cantata by Johann Gottlieb Goldberg
- BWV 217 was possibly composed by Altnickol.

Late cantatas by Johann Sebastian Bach
Date	Occasion	Cantata	BWV	Group	Additional information
1731-12-02	1st Sunday of Advent	Schwingt freudig euch empor	BWV 36, later version	adaptations	Early version 1726–29
1734-12-25	Christmas	Jauchzet, frohlocket! Auf, preiset die Tage	BWV 248 Part I	Oratorios	Part I of Christmas Oratorio
1742-12-25?	Christmas	Gloria in excelsis Deo	BWV 191	adaptations	Based on BWV 232^{I} (1733)
after 1740	Christmas	Gelobet seist du, Jesu Christ	BWV 91, 2nd version	Chor. cant. cycle	5th and 6th mvt. altered
1734-12-26	2nd day of Christmas	Und es waren Hirten in derselben Gegend	BWV 248 Part II	Oratorios	Part II of Christmas Oratorio
1734-12-27	3rd day of Christmas	Herrscher des Himmels, erhöre das Lallen	BWV 248 Part III	Oratorios	Part III of Christmas Oratorio
—	Sunday after Christmas	—	—	—	
1735-01-01	New Year	Fallt mit Danken, fallt mit Loben	BWV 248 Part IV	Oratorios	Part IV of Christmas Oratorio
1733–34	Sunday after New Year	Ach Gott, wie manches Herzeleid	BWV 58, 2nd version	Chor. cant. cycle	After early version (1727)
1735-01-02	Sunday after New Year	Ehre sei dir, Gott, gesungen	BWV 248 Part V	Oratorios	Part V of Christmas Oratorio
1735-01-06	Epiphany	Herr, wenn die stolzen Feinde schnauben	BWV 248 Part VI	Oratorios	Part VI of Christmas Oratorio
before 1761	1st Sunday after Epiphany	Gedenke, Herr, wie es uns gehet	BWV 217/Anh. II 23‑>	BWV Anh. II	Probably spurious
—	2nd Sunday after Epiphany	—	—	—	
—	3rd Sunday after Epiphany	—	—	—	
1735-01-30	4th Sunday after Epiphany	Wär Gott nicht mit uns diese Zeit	BWV 14	Chor. cant. cycle	
1731-02-02	Purification	Ich habe genug	BWV 82, 2nd version	3rd cycle	Also 3rd and 4th versions
after 1727	Purification	Ich lasse dich nicht	BWV 157 later version	Funeral cantatas	Was a funeral cantata in 1727
—	5th Sunday after Epiphany	—	—	—	
—	6th Sunday after Epiphany	—	—	—	
c.1733–34	Septuagesima	Ich bin vergnügt mit meinem Stande	—	(Picander cycle)	(By C. P. E. Bach)
—	Sexagesima	—	—	—	
1728–31	Estomihi	Du wahrer Gott und Davids Sohn	BWV 23, 3rd version	Weimar cantatas	C minor, four movements
—	Annunciation	—	—	—	
c.1738	Easter	Kommt, eilet und laufet	BWV 249	Oratorios	And earlier versions
—	Easter Monday	—	—	—	
c.1730?	Easter Tuesday	Der Friede sei mit dir	BWV 158	2nd cycle?	2nd/3rd mvt. for Purification?
—	Quasimodogeniti	—	—	—	
1731-04-08	Misericordias Domini	Der Herr ist mein getreuer Hirt	BWV 112	Chor. cant. cycle	
—	Jubilate	—	—	—	
—	Cantate	—	—	—	
—	Rogate	—	—	—	
1738-05-15?	Ascension	Lobet Gott in seinen Reichen	BWV 11	Oratorios	Ascension Oratorio
—	Exaudi	—	—	—	
1731-05-13	Pentecost	Erschallet, ihr Lieder	BWV 172, 3rd version	Weimar cantatas	Weimar v. – 1st Leipzig v.
1740?	Pentecost	Raset und brauset	—	(Picander cycle)	(By student Doles)
—	Pentecost Monday	—	—	—	
—	Pentecost Tuesday	—	—	—	
1730-06-04?	Trinity Sunday?	Nun danket alle Gott	BWV 192	Chorale cantatas?	No clear cycle association
—	1st Sunday after Trinity	—	—	—	
—	2nd Sunday after Trinity	—	—	—	
1738-06-24	St. John's Day	Freue dich, erlöste Schar	BWV 30	adaptations	Reworked from BWV 30a
1745–46	St. John's Day	Durch die herzliche Barmherzigkeit	—	(students)	(BNB I/G/2: by Goldberg)
before 1761	St. John's Day	Lobt ihn mit Herz und Munde	BWV 220/Anh. II 23‑>	BWV Anh. II	Unknown composer
—	3rd Sunday after Trinity	—	—	—	
1733-07-02?	Visitation	Magnificat in D Major	BWV 243	Latin church mus.	Also Christmas; 1723 in E♭
before 1761	Visitation	Meine Seele rühmt und preist	BWV 189/Anh. II 23‑>	BWV Anh. II	If by Hoffmann: before 1716
1732-07-06	4th Sunday after Trinity	Ich ruf zu dir, Herr Jesu Christ	BWV 177	Chor. cant. cycle	
c.1746–47	4th Sunday after Trinity	Barmherziges Herze	BWV 185 last version	Weimar cantatas	Three earlier versions
c.1732–33	5th Sunday after Trinity	Wer nur den lieben Gott läßt walten	BWV 93 later version	Chor. cant. cycle	Two creation periods
c.1734	5th Sunday after Trinity	Gott hat uns gesegnet mit allerlei	—	(Namenbuch cycle)	(By Stölzel)
1734-08-01	6th Sunday after Trinity	Es ist das Heil uns kommen her	BWV 9	Chor. cant. cycle	
c.1734	6th Sunday after Trinity	Dies wird sein Name sein	—	(Namenbuch cycle)	(By Stölzel)
—	7th Sunday after Trinity	—	—	—	
—	8th Sunday after Trinity	—	—	—	
—	9th Sunday after Trinity	—	—	—	
—	10th Sunday after Trinity	—	—	—	
—	11th Sunday after Trinity	—	—	—	
—	12th Sunday after Trinity	—	—	—	
1735-09-04	13th Sunday after Trinity	O! wie seelig sind die Blicke	—	(Saitenspiel cycle)	(By Stölzel)
1735-09-11	14th Sunday after Trinity	Schnöder Aussatz meiner Sünden	—	(Saitenspiel cycle)	(By Stölzel)
1730-09-17	15th Sunday after Trinity	Jauchzet Gott in allen Landen	BWV 51	In ogni Tempo.	Late addition to 3rd cycle?
1735-09-18	15th Sunday after Trinity	Sorgen sind die Steine	—	(Saitenspiel cycle)	(By Stölzel)
1735-09-25	15th Sunday after Trinity	Mein JEsu deine Vater-Hand	—	(Saitenspiel cycle)	(By Stölzel)
1747-09-17	16th Sunday after Trinity	Liebster Gott, wenn werd ich sterben	BWV 8, 2nd version	Chor. cant. cycle	After 1st version (1724)
—	17th Sunday after Trinity	—	—	—	
c.1732–35	Michaelmas	Herr Gott, dich loben alle wir	BWV 130, 2nd version	Chor. cant. cycle	After 1st version (1724)
1734-09-29?	Michaelmas	[Textless cantata], BWV 248a	BWV 248 VI a	adaptations	After BWV 1160 (1731)
before 1751?	Michaelmas?	Nun ist das Heil und die Kraft	BWV 50	—	As extant not by Bach?
1734-10-24	18th Sunday after Trinity	Herr Christ, der einge Gottessohn	BWV 96 later version	Chor. cant. cycle	After 1724 v.; also c.1746–47
c.1735?	Reformation Day	Ein feste Burg ist unser Gott	BWV 80, 2nd Leipz. v.	Chor. cant. cycle	After BWV 80b and a
—	19th Sunday after Trinity	—	—	—	
—	20th Sunday after Trinity	—	—	—	
—	21st Sunday after Trinity	—	—	—	
—	22nd Sunday after Trinity	—	—	—	
c.1744–47	23rd Sunday after Trinity	Wohl dem, der sich auf seinen Gott	BWV 139 later version	Chor. cant. cycle	After 1724 version
—	24th Sunday after Trinity	—	—	—	
—	25th Sunday after Trinity	—	—	—	
—	26th Sunday after Trinity	—	—	—	
1731-11-25	27th Sunday after Trinity	Wachet auf, ruft uns die Stimme	BWV 140	Chor. cant. cycle	

=== Advent ===
In Bach's Leipzig there was no concerted church music in the period between the first Sunday of Advent and Christmas (tempus clausum). The final version of Schwingt freudig euch empor, BWV 36 was first presented on the first Sunday of Advent 2 December 1731, with an earlier version of the cantata dated between 1725 and 1730.

=== Christmas to Epiphany ===
From Christmas 1734 to Epiphany 1735 Bach presented six cantatas, together known as the Christmas Oratorio (Weihnachts-Oratorium):

- Christmas 25 December 1734: Jauchzet, frohlocket, auf, preiset die Tage, BWV 248^{I}
- Second day of Christmas 26 December 1734: Und es waren Hirten in derselben Gegend, BWV 248^{II}
- Third day of Christmas 27 December 1734: Herrscher des Himmels, erhöre das Lallen, BWV 248^{III}
- New Year 1 January 1735: Fallt mit Danken, fallt mit Loben, BWV 248^{IV}
- Sunday after New Year 2 January 1735: Ehre sei dir, Gott, gesungen, BWV 248^{V}
- Epiphany 6 January 1735: Herr, wenn die stolzen Feinde schnauben, BWV 248^{VI}

The D Major version of Bach's Magnificat may have been performed on Christmas from 1733 onwards. Other Christmas compositions with text in Latin are the Sanctus in D major, BWV 238 (repeat performance in 1735 or later) and the cantata Gloria in excelsis Deo, BWV 191 (probably first performed in 1745), a composition based on the Kyrie–Gloria mass of 1733 that would be expanded into his Mass in B Minor. The period after the fourth cantata cycle also saw repeat performances of his earlier Christmas cantatas Unser Mund sei voll Lachens, BWV 110, and Gelobet seist du, Jesu Christ, BWV 91, the last one in a new version produced after 1740. Another Christmas cantata, Uns ist ein Kind geboren, BWV 142, was probably not composed by Bach and likely originated before Bach's time in Leipzig.

A new version of Ach Gott, wie manches Herzeleid, BWV 58, was performed on the Sunday after New Year 4 January 1733 or 3 January 1734. This cantata was however added to chorale cantata cycle, even while not completely conforming to the chorale cantata format and in its first version performed on 5 January 1727, a year after the bulk of that cycle had been composed.

=== Between Epiphany and Lent ===
Gedenke, Herr, wie es uns gehet, BWV 217, a cantata for the first Sunday after Epiphany was probably not composed by Bach. Johann Christoph Altnickol has been named as its possible composer.

Herr, wie du willt, so schicks mit mir, BWV 73, the cantata for the third Sunday after Epiphany of the first cycle, was restaged at least two times between 1731 and 1750.

Wär Gott nicht mit uns diese Zeit, BWV 14, first performed on the fourth Sunday after Epiphany 30 January 1735, latest of Bach's extant chorale cantatas, was added to the chorale cantata cycle.

There are no extant cantatas by Johann Sebastian Bach for the fifth and sixth Sunday after Epiphany.

The first version of Ich habe genug, BWV 82, had been performed on the Feast of Purification 2 February 1727. This version for soprano, flute, strings and continuo in E minor is associated with Bach's third cantata cycle, or alternatively the period "between the third and the fourth cycles". After 1729 Bach produced three further versions of this cantata: a version in C Minor for bass, oboe, strings and continuo, for performance in 1731, a third version for Bass or mezzo and a fourth version with an additional oboe da caccia. Komm, du süße Todesstunde, BWV 161 is a Weimar cantata for the 16th Sunday after Trinity. In the mid-1730s Bach had its score copied, adding "item Festo Purific Mariae" (also for the Feast of Purification) to the header of the manuscript. Also Mit Fried und Freud ich fahr dahin, BWV 125, the chorale cantata from 1725, was probably restaged after c.1735. Ich lasse dich nicht, du segnest mich denn, BWV 157 was a funeral cantata in 1727: later it was transformed into a cantata for Purification, a feast that always fell between Epiphany and Lent.

For Septuagesima (third Sunday before Lent) 1727 Bach had composed Ich bin vergnügt mit meinem Glücke, BWV 84, a cantata on a libretto that two years later appeared in a very different form in a libretto cycle published by Picander. The 1727 cantata is however rather associated with Bach's third cantata cycle than with his fourth cantata cycle, which were settings of the librettos Picander had published for church services in 1728–29. However, a few years later Carl Philipp Emanuel Bach, still living with his father in Leipzig, set the three first movements of the 1729 version of Picander's libretto for Septuagesima, Ich bin vergnügt mit meinem Stande.

Bach restaged his first cycle Sexagesima cantata Leichtgesinnte Flattergeister, BWV 181, around 1743–46.

In the period from 1728 to 1731 Bach produced the final C minor version of his Weimar Estomihi cantata Du wahrer Gott und Davids Sohn, BWV 23, in four movements.

=== From Lent to Trinity ===
In Lent only two occasions allowed for concerted music:

- Annunciation (25 March, moved forward to Palm Sunday if that date fell in Good Week) – no known performance of an Annunciation cantata by Bach after 1728.
- Good Friday, on which day a Passion was performed. The only new Passion Bach appears to have composed after 1729 is his (lost) St Mark Passion, BWV 247, staged on Good Friday 1731 and 1744. Bach's Passion settings are however not seen as cantatas.

Der Himmel lacht! Die Erde jubilieret, BWV 31 was an Easter cantata Bach had composed in Weimar. He had already restaged it during his first year in Leipzig, and did so again on Easter 25 March 1731. Apart from that he expanded his Easter cantata from 1725, Kommt, eilet und laufet, BWV 249 into an oratorio (several versions), and restaged it multiple times in the last 20 years of his office as Thomaskantor.

For Easter Monday, Bleib bei uns, denn es will Abend werden, BWV 6, and Erfreut euch, ihr Herzen, BWV 66, belonging to the second and the first cantata cycle respectively, were both restaged more than once after 1729.

Der Friede sei mit dir, BWV 158 is a possibly incomplete Easter Tuesday cantata. Its second and third movement (from a total of only four movements) seem to be derived from an earlier Purification cantata. It may have been performed as Easter Tuesday cantata of the second cycle (no other cantata for that occasion in 1725 extant) and/or shortly after the 4th cycle. Another Easter Tuesday cantata, Ein Herz, das seinen Jesum lebend weiß, BWV 134, belonging to the first cycle, was restaged 27 March 1731, and probably also 12 April 1735.

Am Abend aber desselbigen Sabbats, BWV 42, a cantata from the second cycle for the first Sunday after Easter (Quasimodogeniti), was restaged 1 April 1731.

Der Herr ist mein getreuer Hirt, BWV 112, premiered on the second Sunday after Easter (Misericordias Domini) 8 April 1731, is a late addition to the chorale cantata cycle.

Ihr werdet weinen und heulen, BWV 103, a cantata for the third Sunday after Easter (Jubilate) on a von Ziegler libretto, was probably restaged 15 April 1731. For the next two Sundays (Cantate and Rogate) it is not known which cantatas Bach may have performed in the last 20 years of his life.

The Ascension Oratorio, Lobet Gott in seinen Reichen, BWV 11, was first performed on 19 May 1735. For the Sunday after Ascension (Exaudi) it is not known which cantatas Bach may have performed after the second cycle (1725).

The third version of Erschallet, ihr Lieder, erklinget, ihr Saiten! BWV 172, a Weimar cantata, was first performed on Pentecost 13 May 1731 (second Leipzig version). The libretto for the Pentecost cantata of the 1728–29 Picander cycle, Raset und brauset ihr hefftigen Winde was set by Johann Friedrich Doles, then a student of Bach, in 1740. The cantata was possibly performed in Leipzig at the time.

Erhöhtes Fleisch und Blut, BWV 173, a cantata for Pentecost Monday composed between the third and the fourth cycles, and Erwünschtes Freudenlicht, BWV 184, a first cycle cantata for Pentecost Tuesday, were restaged 14 and 15 May 1731 respectively.

The incomplete cantata Nun danket alle Gott, BWV 192, possibly a Trinity Sunday chorale cantata premiered 4 June 1730, was probably not composed for Leipzig. Whether it can be associated with any cycle is unclear. An earlier Trinity Sunday cantata, Höchsterwünschtes Freudenfest, BWV 192, had already seen three different versions before its second version (1724) was given a repeat performance on 20 May 1731.

=== Between Trinity and Advent ===
It is not known which cantatas Bach may have performed on the first, second and third Sundays after Trinity in the last 20 years of his life.

Freue dich, erlöste Schar, BWV 30 was first performed on the Feast of the Nativity of St. John the Baptist, 24 June 1738. It was a parody of the secular cantata BWV 30a, premiered in 1737. Picander probably wrote the librettos, as well for the original composition as for the parody. Durch die herzliche Barmherzigkeit is a cantata for St. John's Day composed by Johann Gottlieb Goldberg for which Bach helped copy out performance parts around 1745–46. Lobt ihn mit Herz und Munde, BWV 220 is a St. John's Day cantata by an unknown composer. Its oldest manuscript went lost but existed before 1761.

Meine Seele rühmt und preist, BWV 189 is a cantata for Visitation (2 July), using a German paraphrase of the Magnificat as text. It is dated to before 1761, based on what remains from its 18th-century sources. Likely it was however composed by Melchior Hoffmann, in 1715 at the latest. Around 1733 Bach produced the D Major version of his Magnificat, which he possibly performed on Visitation 2 July 1733.

Ich ruf zu dir, Herr Jesu Christ, BWV 177, a per omnes versus chorale cantata first performed on the fourth Sunday after Trinity 6 July 1732, is a late addition to the chorale cantata cycle. Barmherziges Herze der ewigen Liebe, BWV 185 is a Weimar cantata for the fourth Sunday after Trinity existing in four versions, the last of which was produced in Leipzig around 1746–47.

Wer nur den lieben Gott läßt walten, BWV 93 is a chorale cantata for the fifth Sunday after Trinity, first presented in Bach's second year in Leipzig. Around 1732–33 he restaged it in a modified version.

Es ist das Heil uns kommen her, BWV 9 is a chorale cantata for the sixth Sunday after Trinity, first presented on 20 July 1732 and added to the chorale cantata cycle.

It is not known which cantatas Bach may have performed after 1729 on the seventh and eighth Sundays after Trinity.

Was frag ich nach der Welt, BWV 94, a chorale cantata for the ninth Sunday after Trinity, first performed in Bach's second year in Leipzig, was probably restaged around 1732–35. Tue Rechnung! Donnerwort, BWV 168, a 1725 cantata for the same occasion, was possibly restaged after 1745.

For the tenth to thirteenth Sundays after Trinity it is not known which cantatas may have been performed in Leipzig after 1729.

The chorale cantata for the 14th Sunday after Trinity Jesu, der du meine Seele, BWV 78, first performed in 1724, was restaged after 1735.

Jauchzet Gott in allen Landen, BWV 51, first performed on the 15th Sunday after Trinity 17 September 1730, was designated for that Sunday or for any occasion.

Komm, du süße Todesstunde, BWV 161, a cantata for the 16th Sunday after Trinity or Purification, also exists in a later (Leipzig?) version, which was however probably not produced by the composer. For the 16th Sunday after trinity 17 September 1747 Bach produced a second version in D major of the chorale cantata Liebster Gott, wenn werd ich sterben? BWV 8. Its first version, in E major, had been premiered in 1724.

No performances of a cantata for the 17th Sunday after Trinity have been identified in Bach's last 20 years in Leipzig.

The chorale cantata Herr Gott, dich loben alle wir, BWV 130, for Michaelmas, premiered in 1724, was restaged in a modified version around 1732–35. BWV 248 VI a (also indicated as BWV 248a) is a fragment of a nameless Michaeliskantate (Michaelmas cantata), likely first performed in 1734, shortly before its music was almost entirely adopted in the last part of the Christmas Oratorio (BWV 248 VI) Michaelmas has also been suggested for (the cantata fragment?) Nun ist das Heil und die Kraft, BWV 50, which has however an unclear origin.

Herr Christ, der einge Gottessohn, BWV 96, a chorale cantata for the 18th Sunday after Trinity, first performed in 1724, was given a repeat performance with a modified orchestration on 24 October 1734. The cantata was further restaged around 1746–47.

Bach's final version of the Reformation Day cantata Ein feste Burg ist unser Gott, BWV 80 may have originated around 1735. An earlier Leipzig version of the cantata, BWV 80b, was written 1727–31.

For the 19th to 22nd Sundays after Trinity no performed cantatas have been identified in Bach's last 20 years in Leipzig.

A modified version of the 1724 chorale cantata Wohl dem, der sich auf seinen Gott, BWV 139 for the 23rd Sunday after Trinity was presented around 1744–47.

No further cantatas performed on Sundays after Trinity are known for the period 1730–49, until the 27th and last possible Sunday after Trinity: on that Sunday in 1731 Bach premiered Wachet auf, ruft uns die Stimme, BWV 140, a late addition to the chorale cantata cycle.

== Other occasions ==
=== New council ===
The election or inauguration of a new town council was celebrated with a service. Normally this was an annual event. The cantata written for such celebrations were indicated with the term "Ratswechsel" (changing of the council) or "Ratswahl" (election of the council). In Leipzig the service was held at the Nikolaikirche on the Monday following Bartholomew (Bartholomäus), 24 August.

Bach's Leipzig Ratswahl cantatas include:

- Before 1730:
  - Preise, Jerusalem, den Herrn, BWV 119, 30 August 1723
  - Wünschet Jerusalem Glück, BWV Anh. 4, 27 August 1725 (only Picander's text extant)
  - Ihr Tore zu Zion, BWV 193 (incomplete), 25 August 1727
- Bach's last 20 years in Leipzig
  - Gott, gib dein Gerichte dem Könige, BWV 1140 (formerly BWV Anh. 3), 28 August 1730 (only Picander's text extant)
  - Wir danken dir, Gott, wir danken dir, BWV 29, 27 August 1731 (reused 31 August 1739 and 25 August 1749)
  - (BWV 137, chorale cantata for Trinity XII: "A performance on 25.8.1732 (Spitta II, p. 286f. and others) on the occasion of inauguration of the new city council is not proved.")
  - Herrscher des Himmels, König der Ehren, BWV Anh. 193, 29 August 1740 (only text extant)
  - Gott, man lobet dich in der Stille, BWV 120, 29 August 1742
  - Lobe den Herrn, meine Seele, BWV 69, 1743–48 (adapted from BWV 69a)

=== 200th anniversary of the Augsburg Confession ===
25 June 1730 was 200 years after the Augsburg Confession. In Leipzig the occasion was remembered by a three-day festival. Picander wrote three cantata librettos (later published in Ernst-Schertzhaffte und Satyrische Gedichte, Vol. III, 1732), one for each day of the celebration. Johann Sebastian Bach set these librettos. The music of these settings is however largely lost:

1. Singet dem Herrn ein neues Lied, BWV 190a (25 June 1730, BDW 00231 – music lost but presumably borrowed from movements 1, 2, 3 and 5 of BWV 190)
2. Gott, man lobet dich in der Stille, BWV 120b (26 June 1730, BDW 00147 – music lost but partially reconstructable from BWV 120, 120a, 232^{II}/9 and 1019a)
3. Wünschet Jerusalem Glück, BWV Anh. 4a (27 June 1730, BDW 01312 – music lost, probably based on the —equally lost— cantata BWV Anh. 4)

=== Wedding ===
Leipzig church cantatas for weddings include:

- Sein Segen fließt daher wie ein Strom, BWV Anh. 14, 12 February 1725 (lost)
- Auf, süß entzückende Gewalt, BWV Anh. 196, 27 November 1725 (music lost)
- O ewiges Feuer, o Ursprung der Liebe, BWV 34a, after 1 June 1727 (incomplete)
- Der Herr ist freundlich dem, der auf ihn harret, BWV Anh. 211 18 January 1729 (music lost)
- Vergnügende Flammen, verdoppelt die Macht, BWV Anh. 212, 26 July 1729 (music lost)
- Herr Gott, Beherrscher aller Dinge, BWV 120a, 1729? (adapted from BWV 120, partly lost)
- Dem Gerechten muß das Licht, BWV 195, 1727–31?
- Gott ist unsre Zuversicht, BWV 197, 1736/37 (partly based on 197a)
- BWV 117 (1728–31) – BWV 192 (1730) – BWV 97 (1734) – BWV 100 (c.1734–35): (parts of?) chorale cantatas that were possibly initially intended as wedding cantatas (see above).

Apart from church cantatas for weddings Bach also composed secular wedding cantatas such as BWV 202 and 210.

=== Funeral ===
Funeral music of Bach's Leipzig period includes:

- On 6 February 1727, at the funeral of J. C. von Ponickau in Pomßen, a cantata in two parts was presented:
  - Part I: Ich lasse dich nicht, du segnest mich denn, BWV 157, later reused as a cantata for Purification, see above.
  - Part II: Liebster Gott, vergisst du mich, BWV Anh. 209, a lost cantata, composed on a 1711 libretto for the seventh Sunday after Trinity by G. C. Lehms. The cantata may have been composed in the Weimar period, or in the period between the second and the fourth cycle (possibly even as a Trinity XV cantata).
- Klagt, Kinder, klagt es aller Welt, BWV 244a, 24 March 1729, memorial service for Prince Leopold of Anhalt-Köthen (the lost music of this cantata is related to the St Matthew Passion)
- Schließt die Gruft! ihr Trauerglocken, BWV Anh. 16 (1735, music lost)
- Mein Gott, nimm die gerechte Seele, BWV Anh. 17 (music lost)

Apart from church cantatas for funerals, Bach also composed secular mourning music (Trauer-Ode, BWV 198, 17 October 1727) and several funeral motets (e.g. O Jesu Christ, meins Lebens Licht, BWV 118, c.1736–37).

== Reception ==
Most of the cantatas of Bach's last 20 years in Leipzig probably went to Halle with Wilhelm Friedemann Bach, where many of them became lost. Extant parts of Bach's late cantata production include:

- Late additions to the chorale cantata cycle: this cycle remained in Leipzig. Considering almost all chorale cantatas as late compositions, Spitta discussed them extensively in his 19th-century Bach-biography.
- (Cantatas transformed into) oratorios: these were conserved in Carl Philipp Emanuel Bach's legacy.
- Revised versions of cantatas composed for earlier cantata cycles.
- Cantatas composed for occasions outside the liturgical calendar (e.g. sacred cantatas for weddings), cantatas largely consisting of re-used material originally not composed for occasions of the liturgical calendar (e.g. BWV 191), and arrangements of compositions by others (e.g. BWV 200).
- Cantatas composed by students in the period they were tutored by Bach.

Whether there ever was a consistent fifth cycle of cantatas composed by Bach in the last twenty years of his life remains a matter of speculation: evidence of such a cycle is remote and circumstantial, but it is a returning topic in scholarly literature.

== Sources ==
- Glöckner, Andreas (2009). "Ein weiterer Kantatenjahrgang Gottfried Heinrich Stölzels in Bachs Aufführungsrepertoire?" [Is there another cantata cycle by Gottfried Heinrich Stölzel that belonged to Bach’s performance repertoire?]. In Wollny, Peter (ed.). Bach-Jahrbuch 2009 [Bach Yearbook 2009]. Bach-Jahrbuch (in German). Vol. 95. Neue Bachgesellschaft. Leipzig: Evangelische Verlagsanstalt. pp. 95–115. doi:10.13141/bjb.v2009. ISBN 978-3-374-02749-1. ISSN 0084-7682.
- Pfau, Marc-Roderich (2008). "Ein unbekanntes Leipziger Kantatentextheft aus dem Jahr 1735: Neues zum Thema Bach und Stölzel" [An unknown Leipzig cantata text publication from the year 1735: News regarding Bach and Stölzel]. In Wollny, Peter (ed.). Bach-Jahrbuch 2008 [Bach Yearbook 2008]. Bach-Jahrbuch (in German). Vol. 94. Neue Bachgesellschaft. Leipzig: Evangelische Verlagsanstalt. pp. 99–122. doi:10.13141/bjb.v2008. ISBN 978-3-374-02668-5. ISSN 0084-7682.

Church cantatas by Johann Sebastian Bach by chronology
Preceded by Bach's fourth cantata cycle	Late church cantatas by Johann Sebastian Bach; 1729–50
