= Church cantata (Bach) =

Cantata composed by Johann Sebastian Bach

Throughout his life as a musician, Johann Sebastian Bach composed cantatas for both secular and sacred use. He composed his church cantatas for use in the Lutheran church, mainly intended for the occasions of the liturgical year.

== History and context ==
Bach's Nekrolog mentions five cantata cycles: "Fünf Jahrgänge von Kirchenstücken, auf alle Sonn- und Festtage" (Five year-cycles of pieces for the church, for all Sundays and feast days), which would amount to at least 275 cantatas, or over 320 if all cycles would have been ideal cycles. The extant cantatas are around two-thirds of that number, with limited additional information on the ones that went missing or survived as fragments.

The listing below contains cycle information as available in scholarship, and may include cantatas that are or were associated with Bach (e.g., listed in the BWV catalogue), but were not actually composed by him.

=== Before Leipzig ===
Bach's earliest cantatas date from more than 15 years before he became Thomaskantor in Leipzig in 1723. His earliest extant cantatas were composed in Arnstadt and Mühlhausen. In 1708 he moved to Weimar where he wrote most of his church cantatas before the Leipzig era. These pre-Leipzig cantatas are not generally grouped as one of the five cycles mentioned in the Nekrolog. The extant cantatas of the pre-Leipzig era are primarily known by their recasting as a cantata in one of the Leipzig cycles.

==== Early cantatas ====
Bach started composing cantatas around 1707, when he was still an organist in Arnstadt. The first documented performances of his work take place in Mühlhausen, where he was appointed in 1708.

==== Weimar ====
In Weimar, Bach was from 1714 to 1717 commissioned to compose one church cantata a month. In the course of almost four years there he thus covered most occasions of the liturgical year. The expression "Weimar cycle" has been used for the cantatas composed in Weimar from 1714 (which form the bulk of extant cantatas composed before Bach's Leipzig time).

==== Köthen ====
In Köthen, where Bach worked from 1717 to 1723, he restaged some of his earlier church cantatas. Apart from composing several secular cantatas, Lobet den Herrn, alle seine Heerscharen, BWV Anh. 5, is the only new church cantata he appears to have composed there.

=== Leipzig ===
As Thomaskantor, director of music of the main churches of Leipzig, Bach was responsible for the Thomasschule and for the church music at the main churches, where a cantata was required for the service on Sundays and additional church holidays of the liturgical year. When Bach took up his office in 1723, he started to compose new cantatas for most occasions, beginning with Die Elenden sollen essen, BWV 75, first performed in the Nikolaikirche on 30 May 1723, the first Sunday after Trinity. He collected them in annual cycles; five are mentioned in obituaries, three are extant.

The church year begins with the first Sunday in Advent, but Bach started his first Leipzig cycles on the first Sunday after Trinity, which "also marked the beginning of the second half of the Lutheran liturgical year: the Trinity season or "Era of the Church" in which core issues of faith and doctrine are explored, in contrast to the first half, known as the "Temporale" which, beginning in Advent and ending on Trinity Sunday, focuses on the life of Christ, His incarnation, death and resurrection".

Leipzig observed tempus clausum, quiet time, in Advent and Lent, when no cantatas were performed. All cantatas for these occasions date from Bach's earlier time. He reworked some cantatas from this period for different occasions. The high holidays Christmas, Easter and Pentecost were each celebrated on three days. Additionally, feasts were celebrated on fixed dates, the feasts of Purification of Mary (Mariae Reinigung, 2 February), Annunciation (Mariae Verkündigung, 25 March) and Visitation (Mariae Heimsuchung, 2 July), and the Saint's days of St. John the Baptist (Johannis, 24 June), St. Michael (Michaelis, 29 September), St. Stephen (Stephanus, 26 December, the second day of Christmas) and St. John the Evangelist (Johannes, 27 December, the third day of Christmas). Further feasts on fixed days were New Year's Day (Neujahr, 1 January), Epiphany (Epiphanias, 6 January) and Reformation Day (Reformationsfest, 31 October). Sacred cantatas were also performed for the inauguration of a new city council (Ratswechsel, in Leipzig in August), consecration of church and organ, weddings, confession, funerals, and functions of the University of Leipzig.

==== First cycle ====
Bach's first (Leipzig) cantata cycle consists of cantatas or similar liturgical works (e.g. liturgical compositions in Latin) first performed from 30 May 1723 (first Sunday after Trinity) to 4 June 1724 (Trinity).

==== Second cycle ====
Bach started a second annual cycle on the first Sunday after Trinity of 1724, planned to contain only chorale cantatas, each based on a single Lutheran hymn. He began with O Ewigkeit, du Donnerwort, BWV 20, on the first Sunday after Trinity, composed chorale cantatas to the end of the liturgical year, began the next liturgical year with Nun komm, der Heiden Heiland, BWV 62 for the first Sunday in Advent, and kept the plan up to Wie schön leuchtet der Morgenstern, BWV 1, performed on Palm Sunday. For the occasions from Easter to Trinity, he composed no chorale cantatas based exclusively on one hymn, but wrote a few of them in later years, such as Wachet auf, ruft uns die Stimme, BWV 140, for the 28th Sunday after Trinity which had not occurred in 1724.

Bach's second (Leipzig) cantata cycle consists of cantatas first performed from 11 June 1724 (first Sunday after Trinity) to 27 May 1725 (Trinity). The first 40 cantatas of this cycle are chorale cantatas, thus this cycle is also known as the chorale cantata cycle (at least the first 40 cantatas of the cycle are known thus). Bach's chorale cantatas written at a later date and restagings of earlier chorale cantatas are also usually understood as being included in this cycle.

==== Third cycle ====
Bach's third (Leipzig) cantata cycle is traditionally seen as consisting of cantatas first performed from the first Sunday after Trinity in 1725 to Trinity Sunday in 1726, or otherwise before the Picander cycle. More recent scholarship assigns the qualification "between the third and the fourth cycles" to the few known cantatas written from 1727 to the start of the fourth cycle.

In the "third cycle" period Bach also performed many cantatas composed by his second cousin Johann Ludwig Bach a Leipzig premiere. For the period from Purification, 2 February 1726, to Trinity XIII, 15 September 1726, there are extant copies by Johann Sebastian Bach and his usual scribes for 16 cantatas (JLB 1–16), covering nearly half of the occasions in that period. Another cantata, JLB 21, was likely also given its Leipzig premiere in this same period (Easter, 21 April 1726), but was for some time misattributed to Johann Sebastian Bach as his cantata BWV 15.

==== Fourth cycle ====
Bach's fourth (Leipzig) cantata cycle, known as the Picander cycle, consists of cantatas performed for the first time from 24 June 1728 (St. John's Day) to 10 July 1729 (fourth Sunday after Trinity), or later in 1729, to a libretto from the printed cycle of 70 cantata texts for 1728–29 by Picander. Later additions to this cycle and Picander librettos without extant setting from Bach's time in Leipzig can be seen as belonging to this cycle.

==== Later/other ====
Cantatas not belonging to any of the previous: e.g. first performed after the Picander cycle, uncertainty when it was first performed or for which liturgical occasion it was composed, etc. Generally it is not believed that cantatas composed after the Picander cycle amount to a cycle in its own right, at least there are not enough extant cantatas to unambiguously conclude that a fifth Leipzig cantata cycle ever existed.

=== Occasions ===
The Lutheran church of Bach's time prescribed the same readings every year, a section from a Gospel and, recited before this, a corresponding section from an Epistle. A connection between the cantata text and the readings (or at least one of the prescribed hymns for the occasion) was desired. Relevant readings and hymns are linked to the church cantata article for each occasion.

Roman numerals refer to the position of the given Sunday with respect to a feast day or season. For example, "Advent III" is the third Sunday in Advent and "Trinity V" is the fifth Sunday after Trinity. The number of Sundays after Epiphany and Trinity varies with the position of Easter in the calendar. There can be between 22 and 27 Sundays after Trinity. The maximum number of Sundays after Epiphany did not occur while Bach wrote cantatas.

== Advent ==
Advent is celebrated on the four Sundays before Christmas. In Leipzig, only on the first Sunday a cantata was performed, because it was a Fastenzeit (season of abstinence).

=== Advent I ===
Composed before the numbered cycles:

- Nun komm, der Heiden Heiland, BWV 61 (Note: Selected as one of Bach's 33 best church cantatas by Peter Wollny, Michael Maul and John Eliot Gardiner.) (2 December 1714, Weimar)

1 – First year in Leipzig, 28 November 1723:

- BWV 61 restaged

2 – Chorale cantata cycle, 3 December 1724:

- Nun komm, der Heiden Heiland, BWV 62

3 – Between the second and the fourth cycle?:

- BWV 36, early version, first presented between 1725 and 1730

4 – Picander cycle, libretto planned for 28 November 1728:

- Machet die Thore weit (same libretto as planned for Palm Sunday 10 April 1729, see below, with no known setting by Bach)

5 – Other and/or later:

- Schwingt freudig euch empor, BWV 36 (final version), 2 December 1731

=== Advent II ===
Composed before the numbered cycles:

- Wachet! betet! betet! wachet! BWV 70a (6 December 1716; in 1723 expanded to BWV 70 for Trinity XXVI)

4 – Picander libretto for 5 December 1728:

- Erwache doch mein Herze (no known setting by Bach)

=== Advent III ===
Composed before the numbered cycles:

- Ärgre dich, o Seele, nicht, BWV 186a (13 December 1716; in 1723 expanded to BWV 186 for Trinity VII)

4 – Picander libretto for 12 December 1728:

- Alle Plagen, alle Pein (no known setting by Bach)

5 – Other and/or later:

- Georg Philipp Telemann's Das ist je gewißlich wahr, TWV 1:183 (1719 or 1720; misattributed to Bach as BWV 141)

=== Advent IV ===
Composed before the numbered cycles:

- Bereitet die Wege, bereitet die Bahn, BWV 132 (22 December 1715)
- Herz und Mund und Tat und Leben, BWV 147a (20 December 1716; in 1723 expanded to BWV 147 for Visitation)

4 – Picander libretto for 19 December 1728:

- Vergiß es, doch, mein Herze, nicht (no known setting by Bach)

== Christmastide ==
The Christmas season was celebrated from Christmas Day (25 December) through Epiphany (6 January). In Leipzig, three consecutive days were observed for Christmas, with a Christmas cantata performed every day (25–27 December). If a Sunday fell between 27 December and 1 January, the first Sunday of Christmas (Christmas I), it was celebrated with a cantata too. Other cantatas were composed for New Year's Day (1 January), a Sunday between 1 and 6 January (if any: Christmas II or New Year I) and Epiphany.

For the Christmas season of 1734–35 Bach composed the Christmas Oratorio in six parts, each part a cantata to be performed on one of the six feast days that occurred in that Christmas period (there was no Christmas I Sunday in 1734): three days of Christmas, New Year, the Sunday after New Year and Epiphany.

=== Christmas Day ===
Composed before the numbered cycles:

- Christen, ätzet diesen Tag, BWV 63 (1714, Weimar)

1 – First year in Leipzig, 1723:

- BWV 63 restaged
- Magnificat, BWV 243a (including Christmas interpolations)
- Sanctus in D major, BWV 238

2 – Second year in Leipzig, 1724:

- Gelobet seist du, Jesu Christ, BWV 91 (chorale cantata, early version)
- Sanctus for six vocal parts, BWV 232^{III} (early version: a slightly modified version of this Sanctus became the Sanctus, Part III of the Mass in B minor

3 – Third cycle, 1725:

- Unser Mund sei voll Lachens, BWV 110

4 – Picander cycle, 1728/1729:

- Ehre sei Gott in der Höhe, BWV 197a (incomplete)

5 – Other and/or later:

- BWV 110 restaged between 1728 and 1731
- BWV 91 (later version: movement 5 and 6 different)
- Magnificat, BWV 243 (1733, performed on Christmas Day and/or Visitation)
- Jauchzet, frohlocket! Auf, preiset die Tage, BWV 248^{I} (Christmas Oratorio Part I, 1734)
- BWV 238 restaged 1735 and/or later
- Gloria in excelsis Deo, BWV 191 (1742-1746, based on the Gloria of his 1733 Mass for the Dresden court)
- Uns ist ein Kind geboren, BWV 142 (probably spurious)

=== Second Day of Christmas ===
On the second day of Christmas (26 December) Leipzig celebrated Christmas and Saint Stephen's Day in alternating years, with different readings.

1 – First cycle, 1723:

- Darzu ist erschienen der Sohn Gottes, BWV 40

2 – Chorale cantata cycle, 1724:

- Christum wir sollen loben schon, BWV 121

3 – Third cycle, 1725:

- Selig ist der Mann, BWV 57

4 – Picander cycle, libretto planned for 1728:

- Kehret wieder, kommt zurücke (no known setting by Bach)

5 – Other and/or later:

- Und es waren Hirten in derselben Gegend, BWV 248^{II} (Christmas Oratorio Part II, 1734)

=== Third Day of Christmas ===
1 – First cycle, 1723:

- Sehet, welch eine Liebe hat uns der Vater erzeiget, BWV 64

2 – Chorale cantata cycle, 1724:

- Ich freue mich in dir, BWV 133

3 – Third cycle, 1725:

- Süßer Trost, mein Jesus kömmt, BWV 151

4 – Picander cycle, libretto planned for 1728:

- Ich bin in dich entzündt (no known setting by Bach)

5 – Other and/or later:

- Herrscher des Himmels, erhöre das Lallen, BWV 248^{III} (Christmas Oratorio Part III, 1734)

=== Christmas I ===
Composed before the numbered cycles:

- Tritt auf die Glaubensbahn, BWV 152 (30 December 1714)

2 – Chorale cantata cycle, 31 December 1724:

- Das neugeborne Kindelein, BWV 122

3 – Third cycle, 30 December 1725:

- Gottlob! nun geht das Jahr zu Ende, BWV 28

4 – Picander cycle, libretto planned for 1728 (there was however no Sunday between Christmas 27 December 1728 and New Year 1729):

- Niemand kan die Lieb ergründen (no known setting by Bach)

=== New Year's Day ===
On 1 January the feast of the Circumcision of Christ was celebrated, as well as the New Year.

Composed before the numbered cycles:

- Lobe den Herrn, meine Seele, BWV 143 (1709–1711? For Council Election? By Bach?)

1 – First cycle, 1724:

- Singet dem Herrn ein neues Lied, BWV 190 (instrumental parts lost)

2 – Chorale cantata cycle, 1725:

- Jesu, nun sei gepreiset, BWV 41

3 – Third cycle, 1726:

- Herr Gott, dich loben wir, BWV 16

4 – Picander cycle, 1729:

- Gott, wie dein Name, so ist auch dein Ruhm, BWV 171

5 – Other and/or later:

- Fallt mit Danken, fallt mit Loben, BWV 248^{IV} (Christmas Oratorio Part IV, 1735)

=== New Year I ===
In some years, a Sunday falls between New Year's Day and Epiphany. It is known as the Sunday after New Year's Day or as the second Sunday of Christmas.

1 – First cycle, 2 January 1724:

- Schau, lieber Gott, wie meine Feind, BWV 153

2 – Later addition to the chorale cantata cycle:

- BWV 58, although not fully conforming to the chorale cantata format, was a later addition to the chorale cantata cycle (there hadn't been a Sunday between New Year and Epiphany in 1725).

3 – Third cycle or "between the third and the fourth cycles", 5 January 1727:

- Ach Gott, wie manches Herzeleid, BWV 58 (early version, incomplete)

4 – Picander cycle, libretto planned for 2 January 1729:

- Steh auf, mein Herz (no known setting by Bach)

5 – Other and/or later:

- BWV 58, later version: 4 January 1733 or 3 January 1734 — although not fully conforming to the chorale cantata format this cantata was later added to the chorale cantata cycle.
- Ehre sei dir, Gott, gesungen, BWV 248^{V} (Christmas Oratorio Part V, 2 January 1735)

=== Epiphany ===
1 – First cycle, 1724:

- Sie werden aus Saba alle kommen, BWV 65

2 – Chorale cantata cycle, 1725:

- Liebster Immanuel, Herzog der Frommen, BWV 123

4 – Picander cycle, libretto planned for 1729:

- Dieses ist der tag (no known setting by Bach)

5 – Other and/or later:

- Herr, wenn die stolzen Feinde schnauben, BWV 248^{VI} (Christmas Oratorio Part VI, 1735)

== After Epiphany ==
Depending on the date of Easter, a variable number (up to six) of Sundays occurred between Epiphany and Septuagesima, the third Sunday before Ash Wednesday.

=== Epiphany I ===
1 – First cycle, 9 January 1724:

- Mein liebster Jesus ist verloren, BWV 154

2 – Chorale cantata cycle, 7 January 1725:

- Meinen Jesum laß ich nicht, BWV 124

3 – Third cycle, 13 January 1726:

- Liebster Jesu, mein Verlangen, BWV 32

4 – Picander cycle, libretto planned for 9 January 1729:

- Ich bin betrübt (no known setting by Bach)

5 – Other and/or later:

- Gedenke, Herr, wie es uns gehet, BWV 217 (very doubtful, possibly composed by Johann Christoph Altnickol)

=== Epiphany II ===
Composed before the numbered cycles:

- Mein Gott, wie lang, ach lange? BWV 155 (19 January 1716)

1 – First year in Leipzig, 16 January 1724:

- BWV 155 restaged

2 – Chorale cantata cycle, 14 January 1725:

- Ach Gott, wie manches Herzeleid, BWV 3

3 – Third cycle, 20 January 1726:

- Meine Seufzer, meine Tränen, BWV 13

4 – Picander cycle, libretto planned for 16 January 1729:

- Ich hab in mir ein fröhlich Herze (no known setting by Bach)

=== Epiphany III ===
1 – First cycle, 23 January 1724:

- Herr, wie du willt, so schicks mit mir, BWV 73

2 – Chorale cantata cycle, 21 January 1725:

- Was mein Gott will, das g'scheh allzeit, BWV 111

3 – Third cycle, 27 January 1726:

- Alles nur nach Gottes Willen, BWV 72

4 – Picander cycle, 26 January 1727 or 23 January 1729:

- Ich steh mit einem Fuß im Grabe, BWV 156

5 – Other and/or later:

- BWV 73 restaged 1732–35 and 1748–49

=== Epiphany IV ===
1 – First cycle, 30 January 1724:

- Jesus schläft, was soll ich hoffen? BWV 81

2 – Chorale cantata cycle:

- No Epiphany IV in 1725 – see below: Septuagesima
- BWV 14 (see below) was later added to the chorale cantata cycle

3 – Third year in Leipzig, 3 February 1726:

- Johann Ludwig Bach's Gott ist unser Zuversicht, JLB 1 (BDW 08231)

4 – Picander cycle, libretto planned for 30 January 1729:

- Wie bist du doch in mir (no known setting by Bach)

5 – Other and/or later:

- Wär Gott nicht mit uns diese Zeit, BWV 14 (30 January 1735: latest of Bach's extant chorale cantatas, added to the chorale cantata cycle)

=== Epiphany V ===
There is no extant Bach-cantata for Epiphany V, nor for Epiphany VI, Sundays that did not occur every year. In Bach's first year in Leipzig the last Sunday before Pre-Lent was Epiphany IV. In his second year it had been Epiphany III (Bach's chorale cantata for Epiphany IV was composed a decade later, see above). In his third year in Leipzig the last Sunday before Pre-Lent was Epiphany V, on which occasion he staged a cantata by Johann Ludwig Bach. In the Picander cycle the last Sunday before Pre-Lent was also Epiphany V, but there is no extant cantata for that occasion in 1729.

3 – Third year in Leipzig, 10 February 1726:

- Johann Ludwig Bach's Der Gottlosen Arbeit, JLB 2 (BDW 08241)

4 – Picander cycle, libretto planned for 6 February 1729:

- Erwache, du verschlaffnes Herze (no known setting by Bach)

=== Epiphany VI ===
Picander provided a libretto for the sixth Sunday after Epiphany in his 1728–29 cycle of cantata texts, although that Sunday did not occur in the liturgical year for which he wrote his cycle. Epiphany VI did not occur in any of the years Bach was composing his cantata cycles.

4 – Picander cycle, libretto for Epiphany VI:

- Valet will ich dir geben (no known setting by Bach)

== Pre-Lent ==
Pre-Lent comprises the three last Sundays before Lent.

=== Septuagesima ===
Septuagesima is the third Sunday before Ash Wednesday.

1 – First cycle, 6 February 1724:

- Nimm, was dein ist, und gehe hin, BWV 144

2 – Chorale cantata cycle, 28 January 1725:

- Ich hab in Gottes Herz und Sinn, BWV 92

3 – Third year in Leipzig and "between the third and the fourth cycles":

- Johann Ludwig Bach's Darum will ich auch erwählen, JLB 3 (17 February 1726, BDW 08184)
- Ich bin vergnügt mit meinem Glücke, BWV 84 (9 February 1727)

4 – Picander cycle, libretto planned for 13 February 1729:

- Ich bin vergnügt mit meinem Stande (no known setting by Bach; around 1733–34 C. P. E. Bach set the three first movements of the libretto, see below)

5 – Other and/or later:

- Carl Philipp Emanuel Bach's Ich bin vergnügt mit meinem Stande (c.1733–34: setting of the first three movements of the Septuagesima cantata libretto of the Picander cycle, BDW 09341)

=== Sexagesima ===
Sexagesima is the second Sunday before Ash Wednesday.

Composed before the numbered cycles:

- Gleichwie der Regen und Schnee vom Himmel fällt, BWV 18 (early version in G minor, Chorton: 24 February 1715)

1 – First year in Leipzig, 13 February 1724:

- BWV 18 restaged in its Leipzig version (A minor, Kammerton)
- Leichtgesinnte Flattergeister, BWV 181

2 – Chorale cantata cycle, 4 February 1725:

- Erhalt uns, Herr, bei deinem Wort, BWV 126

3 – Third year in Leipzig, 24 February 1726:

- Johann Ludwig Bach's Darum säet euch Gerechtigkeit, JLB 4 (BDW 08243)

4 – Picander cycle, libretto planned for 20 February 1729:

- Sey getreu biß in den Tod (no known setting by Bach)

5 – Other and/or later:

- BWV 181 restaged c.1743–46

=== Estomihi ===
Composed before the numbered cycles:

- Du wahrer Gott und Davids Sohn, BWV 23 (1722–23, C minor, three movements)

1 – Audition and first cycle, 7 February 1723 (Leipzig audition for the post as Thomaskantor) and 20 February 1724 (first cycle):

- Jesus nahm zu sich die Zwölfe, BWV 22
- BWV 23 restaged in its first Leipzig version (B minor, four movements)

2 – Chorale cantata cycle, 11 February 1725:

- Herr Jesu Christ, wahr' Mensch und Gott, BWV 127

3 – Third year in Leipzig and "between the third and the fourth cycles":

- Johann Ludwig Bach's Ja, mir hast du Arbeit gemacht, JLB 5 (3 March 1726, BDW 08208)
- BWV 23 restaged 1728–31, in its final version (C minor, four movements)

4 – Picander cycle, 27 February 1729:

- Sehet, wir gehn hinauf gen Jerusalem, BWV 159

5 – Other and/or later:

- BWV 23, final version: this version was possibly premiered in 1730 or 1731, see above

== Lent ==
During Lent, the Sundays between Ash Wednesday and Easter, "quiet time" was observed in Leipzig. Only the feast of Annunciation was celebrated with a cantata, even if it fell in that time. On Good Friday, a Passion was performed in Leipzig in a Vespers service.

=== Invocabit ===
4 – Picander cycle, libretto planned for 6 March 1729:

- Weg, mein Herz, mit den Gedanken (no known setting by Bach)

=== Reminiscere ===
4 – Picander cycle, libretto planned for 13 March 1729:

- Ich stürme den Himmel mit meinem Gebethe (no known setting by Bach)

=== Oculi ===
Composed before the numbered cycles:

- Widerstehe doch der Sünde, BWV 54 (4 March 1714?)
- Alles, was von Gott geboren, BWV 80a (24 March 1715; music lost)

4 – Picander cycle, libretto planned for 20 March 1729:

- Schliesse dich, mein Herze zu (no known setting by Bach)

=== Laetare ===
4 – Picander cycle, libretto planned for 27 March 1729:

- Wer nur den lieben Gott läßt walten (no known setting by Bach)

=== Judica ===
4 – Picander cycle, libretto planned for 3 April 1729:

- Böse Welt, schmäh immerhin (no known setting by Bach)

=== Palm Sunday ===
The only two extant church cantatas Bach composed for Annunciation (see below) are also Palm Sunday cantatas. He composed one for this combined occasion in Weimar (BWV 182). In Leipzig Annunciation was the only occasion for which concerted music could be performed during Lent, apart from the Passion performed on Good Friday. When 25 March, the normal date for the feast of Annunciation, fell in Holy Week the feast for Annunciation was moved forward to Palm Sunday, which happened in 1728, the second time Bach restaged his Weimar cantata for the combined Annunciation and Palm Sunday occasion.

The other cantata Bach composed for the combined occasion was the last chorale cantata written in his second year in Leipzig, first performed on 25 March 1725 (BWV 1). In 1729, the Picander cycle year, Annunciation fell more than two weeks before Palm Sunday (10 April). Picander did not, however, provide a separate libretto for Palm Sunday in his 1728–29 cycle: he proposed to use the same libretto as for Advent I (see above). There is no extant setting of this libretto by Bach, nor of the separate Annunciation libretto.

=== Good Friday ===
Bach's Passion settings are not listed as cantatas, nor are such Passions usually included in cantata cycles. As an indication of which Passion was performed in the course of which cycle they are listed here:

Before Leipzig:

- "Keiser"'s St Mark Passion, version BC D 5a (early 1710s, with possibly a few movements added or arranged by Bach)
- Weimarer Passion (26 March 1717, lost)

1 – First year in Leipzig, 7 April 1724

- St John Passion, BWV 245, 1st version

2 – Second year in Leipzig, 30 March 1725:

- St John Passion, 2nd version

3 – Third to fifth year in Leipzig:

- "Keiser"'s St Mark Passion, version BC D 5b (19 April 1726, slight revision of BC D 5a)
- St Matthew Passion, BWV 244b (on a libretto by Picander: possibly 11 April 1727)

4 – Period of the Picander cycle, 15 April 1729:

- BWV 244b possibly premiere, or repeat performance

5 – Other and/or later:

- St Luke Passion, BWV 246 (by anonymous composer; 11 April 1732; revised version: 12 April 1743)
- St Mark Passion, BWV 247 (music lost; 23 March 1731; revised version: 3 April 1744)
- BWV 245 restaged probably 7 April 1730 (third version) and 4 April 1749 (fourth version)
- Gottfried Heinrich Stölzel's Ein Lämmlein geht und trägt die Schuld (23 March 1734)
- St Matthew Passion, BWV 244, revised version of BWV 244b restaged 30 March 1736; next revision staged 23 March 1742; later revision(s) probably not staged during Bach's lifetime.
- Georg Philipp Telemann's and Georg Frideric Handel's settings of the Brockes Passion libretto (some movements of the last one also in a pasticcio with movements of the "Keiser" St Mark Passion) and/or the Wer ist der, so von Edom kömmt pasticcio: late 1730s to 1740s.

== Easter ==
The Easter season comprises the time up to Pentecost, starting with three days of Easter.

=== Easter Sunday ===
Composed before the numbered cycles:

- Christ lag in Todes Banden, BWV 4 (early version probably 24 April 1707; chorale cantata)
- Der Himmel lacht! Die Erde jubilieret, BWV 31 (Weimar version: 21 April 1715)

1 – First year in Leipzig, 9 April 1724:

- BWV 4 restaged (Leipzig version)
- BWV 31 restaged (Leipzig version)

2 – Second year in Leipzig and/or chorale cantata cycle, 1 April 1725:

- BWV 4 restaged (expanded Leipzig version; adopted into the chorale cantata cycle)
- Kommt, eilet und laufet, BWV 249 (first version of the Easter Oratorio, then still a cantata)

3 – third year in Leipzig, 21 April 1726:

- Johann Ludwig Bach's Denn du wirst meine Seele nicht in der Hölle lassen, JLB 21 (misattributed to J. S. Bach as BWV 15)

4 – Picander cycle, libretto planned for 17 April 1729:

- Es hat überwunden der Löwe, der Held (no known setting by Bach)

5 – Other and/or later:

- BWV 31 restaged (25 March 1731, Leipzig version)
- BWV 249 restaged several times (expanded into an Oratorio)
- Georg Philipp Telemann's Ich weiß, daß mein Erlöser lebt, TWV 1:877 (composed 1725; misattributed to J. S. Bach as BWV 160)
- Auf, mein Herz! (or) So du mit deinem Munde bekennest Jesum, BWV 145 (Easter Tuesday cantata Ich lebe, mein Herze, zu deinem Ergötzen, BWV 145, converted to a cantata for Easter Sunday by adding two preceding movements, one of which, i.e. the opening movement of TWV 1:1350, was composed by Telemann: it is unlikely that this pasticcio was realised by Bach; BDW 00177)

=== Easter Monday ===
1 – First cantata cycle, 10 April 1724:

- Erfreut euch, ihr Herzen, BWV 66

2 – Second cantata cycle, 2 April 1725:

- Bleib bei uns, denn es will Abend werden, BWV 6

3 – Third year in Leipzig, 22 April 1726:

- Johann Ludwig Bach's Er ist aus der Angst und Gericht genommen, JLB 10 (BDW 08247)

4 – Picander cycle, libretto planned for 18 April 1729:

- Ich bin ein Pilgrim auf der Welt (fragment of a setting of this libretto by J. S. or C. P. E. Bach is known as BWV Anh. 190, BDW 01501)

5 – Other and/or later:

- BWV 6 restaged (perhaps already 13 April 1727, and at least two further undated performances)
- BWV 66 restaged (26 March 1731 and 11 April 1735)

=== Easter Tuesday ===
1 – First cantata cycle, 11 April 1724:

- Ein Herz, das seinen Jesum lebend weiß, BWV 134

2 – Second cantata cycle, 2 April 1725:

- BWV 158? – dating of the cantata is uncertain (see below). Despite its brevity (four movements) the cantata appears as a pasticcio involving two movements of an earlier (Weimar?) cantata for Purification. Its two outer movements fit it to the Eastertide occasion: the text for the first movement is based on the gospel reading for Easter Tuesday, and its last movement sets a stanza of Luther's Easter hymn "Christ lag in Todes Banden", echoing the chorale cantata based on that hymn which was performed at Easter 1724 and 1725.

3 – Third year in Leipzig, 23 April 1726:

- Johann Ludwig Bach's Er machet uns lebendig, JLB 11 (BDW 08195)

4 – Picander cycle, libretto planned for 19 April 1729:

- Ich lebe, mein Herze, zu deinem Ergötzen, BWV 145 (sets Picander's libretto in 5 movements: for the pasticcio version of this cantata expanded by two preceding movements, see above #Easter Sunday)

5 – Other and/or later:

- Der Friede sei mit dir, BWV 158 (c.1730?; incomplete?)
- BWV 134 restaged 27 March 1731, and probably also 12 April 1735

=== Easter I ===
The Sundays between Easter and Pentecost have Latin names, derived from the beginning of the prescribed readings. The first Sunday after Easter is called Quasimodogeniti. Some sources name the Sunday after Easter the second Sunday in Easter, counting Easter Sunday as the first.

1 – First cantata cycle, 16 April 1724:

- Halt im Gedächtnis Jesum Christ, BWV 67

2 – Second cantata cycle, 8 April 1725:

- Am Abend aber desselbigen Sabbats, BWV 42
- An abandoned sketch of seven bars, BWV deest, BC A64, is possibly Bach's first attempt to compose a cantata for this Sunday (BDW 01529).

3 – Third year in Leipzig, 28 April 1726:

- Johann Ludwig Bach's Wie lieblich sind auf den Bergen, JLB 6 (BDW 08245)

4 – Picander cycle, libretto planned for 24 April 1729:

- Welt, behalte du das deine (no known setting by Bach)

5 – Other and/or later:

- BWV 42 restaged 1 April 1731

=== Easter II ===
The second Sunday after Easter is called Misericordias Domini.

1 – First cantata cycle, 23 April 1724:

- Du Hirte Israel, höre, BWV 104

2 – Second year cycle and/or chorale cantata cycle:

- Ich bin ein guter Hirt, BWV 85 (15 April 1725, premiered in Bach's second year in Leipzig)
- BWV 112 (see below) later added to chorale cantata cycle

3 – Third year in Leipzig, 5 May 1726:

- Johann Ludwig Bach's Und ich will ihnen einen einigen Hirten, JLB 12 (BDW 08300)

4 – Picander cycle, libretto planned for 1 May 1729:

- Ich kan mich besser nicht versorgen (no known setting by Bach)

5 – Other and/or later:

- Der Herr ist mein getreuer Hirt, BWV 112 (chorale cantata, 8 April 1731 → chorale cantata cycle)

=== Easter III ===
The third Sunday after Easter is called Jubilate.

Composed before the numbered cycles:

- Weinen, Klagen, Sorgen, Zagen, BWV 12 (22 April 1714, Weimar)

1 – First year in Leipzig, 30 April 1724:

- BWV 12 restaged in a version with a slightly modified instrumentation

2 – Second year cycle, 22 April 1725:

- Ihr werdet weinen und heulen, BWV 103 (C. M. von Ziegler libretto)

3 – Third year in Leipzig, 12 May 1726:

- Wir müssen durch viel Trübsal, BWV 146 (or: 4 May 1727?)
- Johann Ludwig Bach's Die mit Tränen säen, JLB 8 (BDW 08290)

4 – Picander cycle, libretto planned for 8 May 1729:

- Faße dich betrübter Sinn (no known setting by Bach)

5 – Other and/or later:

- BWV 103 restaged probably 15 April 1731

=== Easter IV ===
The fourth Sunday after Easter is called Cantate.

Composed before the numbered cycles:

- Leb ich, oder leb ich nicht, BWV Anh. 191 (19 May 1715; music lost, extant libretto by Salomon Franck published Weimar 1715; BDW 01502)

1 – First cantata cycle, 7 May 1724:

- Wo gehest du hin? BWV 166

2 – Second year cycle, 29 April 1725:

- Es ist euch gut, daß ich hingehe, BWV 108 (C. M. von Ziegler libretto)

3 – Third year in Leipzig, 19 May 1726:

- Johann Ludwig Bach's Die Weisheit kömmt nicht, JLB 14 (BDW 08305)

4 – Picander cycle, libretto planned for 15 May 1729:

- Ja! Ja! Ich bin nun ganz verlassen (no known setting by Bach)

=== Easter V ===
The fifth Sunday after Easter is called Rogate.

1 – First cantata cycle, 14 May 1724:

- Wahrlich, wahrlich, ich sage euch, BWV BWV 86

2 – Second year cycle, 6 May 1725:

- Bisher habt ihr nichts gebeten in meinem Namen, BWV 87 (based on a C. M. von Ziegler libretto)

4 – Picander cycle, libretto planned for 22 May 1729:

- Ich Schreye laut mit meiner Stimme (no known setting by Bach)

=== Ascension ===
1 – First cantata cycle, 18 May 1724:

- Wer da gläubet und getauft wird, BWV 37

2 – Second year cycle, 10 May 1725:

- Auf Christi Himmelfahrt allein, BWV 128 (C. M. von Ziegler libretto)

3 – Third cantata cycle, 30 May 1726:

- Gott fähret auf mit Jauchzen, BWV 43

4 – Picander cycle, libretto planned for 26 May 1729:

- Alles, alles Himmel-werts (no known setting by Bach)

5 – Other and/or later:

- Lobet Gott in seinen Reichen, BWV 11 (15 May 1738?, Ascension Oratorio)

=== Ascension I ===
The Sunday after Ascension is called Exaudi.

1 – First cycle, 21 May 1724:

- Sie werden euch in den Bann tun, BWV 44

2 – Second cycle, 13 May 1725:

- Sie werden euch in den Bann tun, BWV 183 (C. M. von Ziegler libretto)

4 – Picander cycle, libretto planned for 29 May 1729:

- Quäle dich nur nicht, mein Herz (no known setting by Bach)

== Pentecost to Trinity ==
Leipzig publications with the text of the cantatas for the four occasions from Pentecost to Trinity are extant for 1727 and 1731.

=== Pentecost Sunday ===
Pentecost Sunday (1. Pfingsttag) is also called Whit Sunday.

Composed before the numbered cycles:

- Erschallet, ihr Lieder, erklinget, ihr Saiten! BWV 172 (Weimar version in C major: 20 May 1714)

1 – First year in Leipzig, 28 May 1724:

- BWV 172 restaged in its first Leipzig version (D major)
- Wer mich liebet, der wird mein Wort halten, BWV 59

2 – Second cycle, 20 May 1725:

- Wer mich liebet, der wird mein Wort halten, BWV 74 (C. M. von Ziegler libretto)

3 – "Between the third and the fourth cycles":

- O ewiges Feuer, o Ursprung der Liebe, BWV 34 (1 June 1727)

4 – Picander cycle, libretto planned for 5 June 1729:

- Raset und brauset ihr hefftigen Winde (no known setting by Bach, however in 1740 Johann Friedrich Doles, then a student of Bach, produced a setting of this libretto, see below)

5 – Other and/or later:

- BWV 59 and BWV 172 (second Leipzig version in C major) restaged 13 May 1731
- Johann Friedrich Doles' Raset und brauset ihr hefftigen Winde (on a libretto of the Picander cycle, composed and possibly performed in Leipzig in 1740)
- BWV 34 restaged on 12 May 1746 in Halle (start of W. F. Bach's tenure there)
- Georg Philipp Telemann's Gott der Hoffnung erfülle euch, TWV 1:634, spuriously attributed to J. S. Bach as BWV 218.

=== Pentecost Monday ===
Pentecost Monday (2. Pfingsttag) is also called Whit Monday.

2 – Second cycle, 21 May 1725:

- Also hat Gott die Welt geliebt, BWV 68 (C. M. von Ziegler libretto)

3 – "Between the third and the fourth cycles":

- Erhöhtes Fleisch und Blut, BWV 173 (2 June 1727)

4 – Picander cycle, 6 June 1729:

- Ich liebe den Höchsten von ganzem Gemüte, BWV 174

5 – Other and/or later:

- BWV 173 restaged 14 May 1731

=== Pentecost Tuesday ===
Pentecost Tuesday (3. Pfingsttag) is also called Whit Tuesday.

1 – First cycle, 30 May 1724:

- Erwünschtes Freudenlicht, BWV 184

2 – Second cycle, 22 May 1725:

- Er rufet seinen Schafen mit Namen, BWV 175 (C. M. von Ziegler libretto)

3 – "Between the third and the fourth cycles":

- BWV 184 restaged 3 June 1727

4 – Picander cycle, libretto planned for 7 June 1729:

- Ich klopff an deine Gnaden-Thüre (no known setting by Bach)

5 – Other and/or later:

- BWV 184 restaged 15 May 1731

=== Trinity ===
On Trinity Sunday, the Sunday after Pentecost, the Trinity is celebrated.

Composed before the numbered cycles:

- O heilges Geist- und Wasserbad, BWV 165 (16 June 1715)

1 – First year in Leipzig, 4 June 1724:

- BWV 194, originally a 1723 consecration cantata (see below), restaged in its first Leipzig version

2 – Second cycle and chorale cantata cycle:

- Es ist ein trotzig und verzagt Ding, BWV 176 (27 May 1725; last of the extant cantatas on a C. M. von Ziegler libretto)
- BWV 129 (see below) later added to chorale cantata cycle

3 – Third year in Leipzig and "Between the third and the fourth cycles":

- BWV 194, second Leipzig version with the movements in a different order, restaged 16 June 1726
- Gelobet sei der Herr, mein Gott, BWV 129 (8 June 1727, chorale cantata added to the chorale cantata cycle)

4 – Picander cycle, libretto planned for 12 June 1729:

- Gott will mich in den Himmel haben (no known setting by Bach)

5 – Other and/or later:

- Nun danket alle Gott, BWV 192 (4 June 1730, probably not in Leipzig)
- BWV 194, first Leipzig version, restaged 20 May 1731
- BWV 176 re-staged around 1749

== Sundays after Trinity ==
A variable number of Sundays, up to 27 if Easter is extremely early, occurs between Trinity and the next liturgical year, which starts with the first Sunday of Advent.

Bach's first two Leipzig cantata cycles start on the first Sunday after Trinity: it was the first occasion of his tenure as Thomaskantor (30 May 1723: BWV 75), and the next year he composed the first cantata of his chorale cantata cycle for this occasion (11 June 1724: BWV 20).

After his cantata for Trinity 1725 (BWV 176, see above), which concluded his second year in Leipzig, there are however no extant cantatas before BWV 168 for the ninth Sunday after Trinity, considered the first cantata of the third cycle. For the first Sunday after Trinity 1726 he composed BWV 39, considered as a later addition to the third cycle.

The incomplete fourth cycle was supposed to start on St. John's Day 24 June 1728, followed by a cantata for the fifth Sunday after Trinity on 27 June, at least as far as the first print of Picander's libretto of this cycle is concerned. Bach's oldest extant setting of a libretto of this cycle is however a cantata for the 21st Sunday after Trinity, 17 October 1728, and when the cycle's librettos were printed for the second time in 1732 Picander indicated 1729 as the year of the cycle.

The elusive fifth cycle has an even less clear start. It is not known which cantatas exactly belonged to this cycle: it may have been a collection of cantatas written before Bach's Leipzig time that were not otherwise added to one of the other numbered cycles, and of cantatas written at a later date.

=== Trinity I ===
1 – First cycle, 30 May 1723:

- Die Elenden sollen essen, BWV 75

2 – Chorale cantata cycle, 11 June 1724:

- O Ewigkeit, du Donnerwort, BWV 20

3 – Third cycle:

- Brich dem Hungrigen dein Brot, BWV 39 (23 June 1726)

4 – Picander cycle, libretto planned for 19 June 1729:

- Welt, dein Purpur stinckt mich an (no known setting by Bach)

=== Trinity II ===
1 – First cycle, 6 June 1723:

- Die Himmel erzählen die Ehre Gottes, BWV 76 (in two parts)

2 – Chorale cantata cycle, 18 June 1724:

- Ach Gott, vom Himmel sieh darein, BWV 2
- BWV 76, part II, restaged (or: in 1725)

3 – Third year in Leipzig, 10 June 1725:

- BWV 76, part II, restaged (or: in 1724)

4 – Picander cycle, libretto planned for 26 June 1729:

- Kommt, eilet, ihr Gäste, zum seligen Mahle (no known setting by Bach)

5 – Other and/or later:

- BWV 76, part I, possibly restaged after 1740 on Reformation Day

=== Trinity III ===
Composed before the numbered cycles:

- Ich hatte viel Bekümmernis, BWV 21 (C minor, Weimar: 17 June 1714; D minor, Köthen/Hamburg: 1720)

1 – First year in Leipzig, 13 June 1723:

- BWV 21 restaged (third version in C minor)

2 – Chorale cantata cycle, 25 June 1724:

- Ach Herr, mich armen Sünder, BWV 135 (25 June 1724)

3 – Third year in Leipzig, 17 June 1725:

- BDW 1669: Johannes Agricola's chorale "Ich ruf zu dir, Herr Jesu Christ" was published in Leipzig as the text for the cantata performed on Trinity III 1725. As it is the same text that was used for the Trinity IV cantata BWV 177 (see below) it may have been an early version of that cantata. Alternatively the 1725 publication may refer to a setting by someone else, e.g., Telemann (BDW 01669)

4 – Picander cycle, libretto planned for 3 July 1729:

- Wohin? mein Herz (no known setting by Bach)

=== Trinity IV ===
Composed before the numbered cycles:

- Barmherziges Herze der ewigen Liebe, BWV 185 (14 July 1715)

1 – First year in Leipzig, 20 June 1723:

- BWV 185 restaged
- Ein ungefärbt Gemüte, BWV 24

2 – Chorale cantata cycle:

- BWV 10: in 1724 Trinity IV fell on 2 July, and thus coincided with the Feast of the Visitation (see below)
- BWV 177 later added to the chorale cantata cycle as Trinity IV cantata (see below)

3 – Third year in Leipzig, 24 June 1725:

- BDW 1673: In 1725 Trinity IV fell on 24 June, and thus coincided with St. John's Day (see below)

4 – Picander cycle, libretto planned for 10 July 1729:

- Laß sie spotten, laß sie lachen (no known setting by Bach)

5 – Other and/or later:

- Ich ruf zu dir, Herr Jesu Christ, BWV 177 (6 July 1732: chorale cantata, added to the chorale cantata cycle – libretto published in 1725 for Trinity III, see above)
- BWV 185 restaged around 1746–47

=== Trinity V ===
2 – Chorale cantata cycle, 9 July 1724:

- Wer nur den lieben Gott läßt walten, BWV 93

3 – Third and fourth year in Leipzig:

- Der Segen des Herrn machet reich ohne Mühe, BNB II/An/2 (1 July 1725, music lost, not necessarily composed by Bach – also Telemann suggested as possible composer, BDW 11069)
- Siehe, ich will viel Fischer aussenden, BWV 88 (21 July 1726)

4 – Picander cycle, libretto planned for 27 June 1728:

- In allen meinen thaten (no known setting by Bach)

5 – Other and/or later:

- BWV 93 restaged 1732–33

=== Trinity VI ===
2 – Chorale cantata cycle:

- BWV 9 later added to the chorale cantata cycle (see below)

3 – Third and fourth year in Leipzig:

- Wer sich rächet, an dem wird sich der Herr wieder rächen, BNB II/An/10 (8 July 1725, music lost, not necessarily composed by Bach – also Telemann suggested as possible composer, BDW 01670)
- Vergnügte Ruh, beliebte Seelenlust, BWV 170 (28 July 1726)
- Johann Ludwig Bach's Ich will meinen Geist, JLB 7 (28 July 1726, BDW 08226)

4 – Picander cycle, libretto planned for 4 July 1728:

- Gott, gieb mir ein versöhnlich Herze (no known setting by Bach)

5 – Other and/or later:

- Es ist das Heil uns kommen her, BWV 9 (1 August 1734): chorale cantata, added to the chorale cantata cycle)

=== Trinity VII ===
1 – First cycle, 11 July 1723:

- Ärgre dich, o Seele, nicht, BWV 186 (adapted from BWV 186a for Advent III, see above)

2 – Chorale cantata cycle, 23 July 1724:

- Was willst du dich betrüben, BWV 107

3 – Third and fourth year in Leipzig:

- Gesegnet ist die Zuversicht, BWV Anh. 1 (probably 15 July 1725; probably identical to Telemann's TWV 1:617 or 616)
- Es wartet alles auf dich, BWV 187 (4 August 1726)

4 – Picander cycle, libretto planned for 11 July 1728:

- Ach Gott! ich bin von dir (no known setting by Bach)

5 – Other and/or later:

- Liebster Gott, vergisst du mich, BWV Anh. 209 (before 6 February 1727 when it was combined with BWV 157; The cantata's music, probably by Bach, is lost)

=== Trinity VIII ===
1 – First cycle, 18 July 1723:

- Erforsche mich, Gott, und erfahre mein Herz, BWV 136

2 – Chorale cantata cycle, 30 July 1724:

- Wo Gott der Herr nicht bei uns hält, BWV 178

3 – Third cycle:

- Es ist dir gesagt, Mensch, was gut ist, BWV 45 (11 August 1726)

4 – Picander cycle, libretto planned for 18 July 1728:

- Herr, stärcke meinen schwachen Glauben (no known setting by Bach)

=== Trinity IX ===
1 – First cycle, 25 July 1723:

- Herr, gehe nicht ins Gericht mit deinem Knecht, BWV 105

2 – Chorale cantata cycle, 6 August 1724:

- Was frag ich nach der Welt, BWV 94

3 – Third cycle, 29 July 1725:

- Tue Rechnung! Donnerwort, BWV 168

4 – Picander cycle, libretto planned for 25 July 1728:

- Mein Jesu, was meine (no known setting by Bach)

5 – Other and/or later:

- BWV 94 probably restaged 1732–35
- BWV 168 presumably restaged after 1745

=== Trinity X ===
1 – First cycle, 1 August 1723:

- Schauet doch und sehet, ob irgend ein Schmerz sei, BWV 46

2 – Chorale cantata cycle, 13 August 1724:

- Nimm von uns, Herr, du treuer Gott, BWV 101

3 – Third cycle:

- Herr, deine Augen sehen nach dem Glauben, BWV 102 25 August 1726

4 – Picander cycle, libretto planned for 1 August 1728:

- Laßt meine Thränen euch bewegen (no known setting by Bach)

=== Trinity XI ===
Composed before the numbered cycles:

- Mein Herze schwimmt im Blut, BWV 199 (12 August 1714: Weimar version in C minor; restaged in Köthen in a version in D minor)

1 – First cycle, 8 August 1723:

- BWV 199 restaged (Leipzig version in D minor)
- Siehe zu, daß deine Gottesfurcht nicht Heuchelei sei, BWV 179

2 – Chorale cantata cycle, 20 August 1724:

- Herr Jesu Christ, du höchstes Gut, BWV 113

3 – Between the second and the fourth cycle:

- Johann Ludwig Bach's Durch sein Erkenntnis, JLB 15 (1 September 1726, BDW 08308)

4 – Picander cycle, libretto planned for 8 August 1728:

- Ich scheue mich (no known setting by Bach)

=== Trinity XII ===
1 – First cycle, 15 August 1723:

- Lobe den Herrn, meine Seele, BWV 69a

2 – Chorale cantata cycle:

- BWV 137 later added to the chorale cantata cycle

3 – Between the second and the fourth cycle:

- Lobe den Herren, den mächtigen König der Ehren, BWV 137 (19 August 1725, chorale cantata added to the chorale cantata cycle)
- Geist und Seele wird verwirret, BWV 35 (8 September 1726, generally seen as a third cycle cantata)
- BWV 69a restaged around 1727

4 – Picander cycle, libretto planned for 15 August 1728:

- Ich bin wie einer, der nicht höret (no known setting by Bach)

=== Trinity XIII ===
1 – First cycle, 22 August 1723:

- Du sollt Gott, deinen Herren, lieben, BWV 77

2 – Chorale cantata cycle, 3 September 1724:

- Allein zu dir, Herr Jesu Christ, BWV 33

3 – Between the second and the fourth cycle:

- Ihr, die ihr euch von Christo nennet, BWV 164 (26 August 1725)
- Johann Ludwig Bach's Ich aber ging für dir über, JLB 16 (15 September 1726, BDW 08229)

4 – Picander cycle, libretto planned for 22 August 1728:

- Können meine nasse Wangen (no known setting by Bach)

=== Trinity XIV ===
1 – First cycle, 29 August 1723:

- Es ist nichts Gesundes an meinem Leibe, BWV 25

2 – Chorale cantata cycle, 10 September 1724:

- Jesu, der du meine Seele, BWV 78

3 – Third cycle, 22 September 1726:

- Wer Dank opfert, der preiset mich, BWV 17

4 – Picander cycle, libretto planned for 29 August 1728:

- Schöpffer aller Dinge (no known setting by Bach)

5 – Other and/or later:

- BWV 78 restaged after 1735

=== Trinity XV ===
1 – First cycle, 5 September 1723:

- Warum betrübst du dich, mein Herz, BWV 138

2 – Chorale cantata cycle, 17 September 1724:

- Was Gott tut, das ist wohlgetan, BWV 99

4 – Picander cycle, libretto planned for 5 September 1728:

- Arm, und dennoch frölich seyn (no known setting by Bach)

5 – Other and/or later:

- Jauchzet Gott in allen Landen, BWV 51 (17 September 1730)

=== Trinity XVI ===
Composed before the numbered cycles:

- Komm, du süße Todesstunde, BWV 161 (27 September 1716)

1 – First cycle, 12 September 1723:

- Christus, der ist mein Leben, BWV 95

2 – Chorale cantata cycle, 24 September 1724:

- Liebster Gott, wenn werd ich sterben? BWV 8 (first version in E major)

3 – Third cycle, 6 October 1726:

- Wer weiß, wie nahe mir mein Ende? BWV 27

4 – Picander cycle, libretto planned for 12 September 1728:

- Schließet euch, ihr müden Augen (no known setting by Bach)

5 – Other and/or later:

- BWV 161 from around 1735 recast as a cantata for Purification (see below); a second version of BWV 161 is possibly not by Bach
- BWV 8 restaged 17 September 1747 (second version in D major)

=== Trinity XVII ===
1 – First cycle, 19 September 1723:

- Bringet dem Herrn Ehre seines Namens, BWV 148

2 – Chorale cantata cycle, 1 October 1724:

- Ach, lieben Christen, seid getrost, BWV 114

3 – Third cycle, 13 October 1726:

- Wer sich selbst erhöhet, der soll erniedriget werden, BWV 47

4 – Picander cycle, libretto planned for 19 September 1728:

- Stolz und Pracht (no known setting by Bach)

=== Trinity XVIII ===
2 – Chorale cantata cycle, 8 October 1724:

- Herr Christ, der einge Gottessohn, BWV 96

3 – Third cycle, 20 October 1726:

- Gott soll allein mein Herze haben, BWV 169

4 – Picander cycle, libretto planned for 26 September 1728:

- Ich liebe Gott vor allen Dingen (no known setting by Bach)

5 – Other and/or later:

- BWV 96 restaged 24 October 1734 and 1 October 1747

=== Trinity XIX ===
1 – First cycle, 3 October 1723:

- Ich elender Mensch, wer wird mich erlösen, BWV BWV 48

2 – Chorale cantata cycle, 15 October 1724:

- Wo soll ich fliehen hin, BWV BWV 5

3 – Third cycle, 27 October 1726:

- Ich will den Kreuzstab gerne tragen, BWV 56

4 – Picander cycle, libretto planned for 3 October 1728:

- Gott, du Richter der Gedanken (BWV Anh. 2 may be the start of a 1729 abandoned setting of this libretto)

=== Trinity XX ===
Composed before the numbered cycles:

- Ach! ich sehe, itzt, da ich zur Hochzeit gehe, BWV 162 (25 October 1716)

1 – First year in Leipzig, 10 October 1723:

- BWV 162 restaged

2 – Chorale cantata cycle, 22 October 1724:

- Schmücke dich, o liebe Seele, BWV 180

3 – Third cycle, 3 November 1726:

- Ich geh und suche mit Verlangen, BWV 49

4 – Picander cycle, libretto planned for 10 October 1728:

- Ach ruffe mich bald (no known setting by Bach)

=== Trinity XXI ===
1 – First cycle, 17 October 1723:

- Ich glaube, lieber Herr, hilf meinem Unglauben, BWV 109

2 – Chorale cantata cycle, 29 October 1724:

- Aus tiefer Not schrei ich zu dir, BWV 38

3 – Third cycle, 10 November 1726:

- Was Gott tut, das ist wohlgetan, BWV 98

4 – Picander cycle, 17 October 1728:

- Ich habe meine Zuversicht, BWV 188

=== Trinity XXII ===
1 – First cycle, 24 October 1723:

- Was soll ich aus dir machen, Ephraim, BWV 89

2 – Chorale cantata cycle, 5 November 1724:

- Mache dich, mein Geist, bereit, BWV 115

3 – Third cycle, 17 November 1726:

- Ich armer Mensch, ich Sündenknecht, BWV 55 (two versions, so 17 November 1726 is probably not the only date)

4 – Picander cycle, libretto planned for 24 October 1728:

- Gedult, mein Gott, Gedult (no known setting by Bach)

=== Trinity XXIII ===
Composed before the numbered cycles:

- Nur jedem das Seine, BWV 163 (24 November 1715)

1 – First year in Leipzig, 31 October 1723 (=Reformation Day, see below):

- BWV 163 possibly restaged

2 – Chorale cantata cycle, 12 November 1724:

- Wohl dem, der sich auf seinen Gott, BWV 139

3 – Third cycle, 24 November 1726:

- Falsche Welt, dir trau ich nicht, BWV 52

4 – Picander cycle, libretto planned for 31 October 1728 (i.e. Reformation Day, see below):

- Schnöde Schönheit dieser Welt (no known setting by Bach)

5 – Other and/or later:

- BWV 139 restaged around 1744–47

=== Trinity XXIV ===
1 – First cycle, 7 November 1723:

- O Ewigkeit, du Donnerwort, BWV 60

2 – Chorale cantata cycle, 19 November 1724:

- Ach wie flüchtig, ach wie nichtig, BWV 26 (chorale cantata, 19 November 1724)

4 – Picander cycle, libretto planned for 7 November 1728:

- Küsse mein Herze, mit Freuden die Ruthe (no known setting by Bach)

=== Trinity XXV ===
1 – First cycle, 14 November 1723:

- Es reißet euch ein schrecklich Ende, BWV 90

2 – Chorale cantata cycle, 26 November 1724:

- Du Friedefürst, Herr Jesu Christ, BWV 116

4 – Picander cycle, libretto planned for 14 November 1728:

- Eile, rette deine Seele (no known setting by Bach)

=== Trinity XXVI ===
1 – First cycle, 21 November 1723:

- Wachet! betet! betet! wachet! BWV 70 (adapted from a Weimar Advent II cantata, see above)

4 – Picander cycle, libretto planned for 21 November 1728:

- Kömmt denn nicht mein Jesus bald? (no known setting by Bach)

=== Trinity XXVII ===
2 – Chorale cantata cycle

- BWV 140 is a later addition to the chorale cantata cycle

5 – Other and/or later:

- Wachet auf, ruft uns die Stimme, BWV 140 (25 November 1731, chorale cantata added to the chorale cantata cycle)

== Fixed festivals within the Liturgical Year ==
=== Purification ===
The Purification of Mary (Mariae Reinigung) and the Presentation of Jesus at the Temple are celebrated on 2 February.

1 – First year in Leipzig, 1724:

- Erfreute Zeit im neuen Bunde, BWV 83

2 – Chorale cantata cycle, 1725:

- Mit Fried und Freud ich fahr dahin, BWV 125

3 – Between the second and the fourth cycle:

- Johann Ludwig Bach's Mache dich auf, werde licht, JLB 9 (1726, BDW 08233)
- Ich habe genug, BWV 82 (first version in C minor: 1727)
- BWV 83 probably restaged 1727

4 – Picander cycle, libretto planned for 1729:

- Herr, nun lässest du deinen Diener in Friede fahren (no known setting by Bach)

5 – Other and/or later:

- BWV 82 (second version in E minor: 1731; two further versions in C minor)
- BWV 161: used to be a Trinity XVI cantata (see above): from around 1735 restaged as Purification cantata
- BWV 125 restaged after 1735
- BWV 157, originally a funeral cantata (see below), was later restaged as cantata for Purification
- BWV 158, surviving in a version for Easter Tuesday (see above), may, at least for its two inner movements, be based on a cantata for Purification
- Johann Ernst Bach II's Mein Odem ist schwach (misattributed to J. S. Bach as BWV 222; BDW 00279)
- Georg Philipp Telemann's Ich habe Lust abzuscheiden, TWV 1:836 (1724; misattributed to Bach as BWV Anh. 157, BDW 01468)

=== Annunciation ===
The Annunciation (Mariae Verkündigung) is celebrated on 25 March, or (in Leipzig) on Palm Sunday when 25 March falls in Holy Week (see above). Bach's only extant Annunciation cantatas were composed in years when Annunciation coincided with Palm Sunday.

Composed before the numbered cycles:

- Himmelskönig, sei willkommen, BWV 182 (performed on Palm Sunday 25 March 1714)

1 – First year in Leipzig, Palm Sunday 25 March 1724:

- BWV 182 restaged
- Siehe eine Jungfrau ist schwanger, BWV Anh. 199 (music lost, BDW 01510)

2 – Chorale cantata cycle, Palm Sunday 25 March 1725:

- Wie schön leuchtet der Morgenstern, BWV 1

3 – "Between the second and the fourth cycle":

- BWV 182 restaged on Palm Sunday 21 March 1728

4 – Picander cycle, libretto planned for 25 March 1729:

- Der Herr ist mit mir, darum fürchte ich mich nicht (no known setting by Bach)

5 – Other and/or later:

- Georg Philipp Telemann's Herr Christ der ein'ge Gottessohn, TWV 1:732, was misattributed to Bach as BWV Anh. 156 (BDW 01467)

=== St. John's Day ===
The Feast of John the Baptist (Johannistag), remembering the birth of John the Baptist, is celebrated on 24 June.

1 – First cantata cycle, 1723:

- Ihr Menschen, rühmet Gottes Liebe, BWV 167

2 – Chorale cantata cycle, 1724:

- Christ unser Herr zum Jordan kam, BWV 7

3 – Third year in Leipzig:

- Erdmann Neumeister's 1711 cantata libretto Gelobet sei der Herr, der Gott Israel was printed in 1725 in Leipzig as the text of the cantata performed on that day: whoever set the libretto (Bach? Telemann?), no composition is extant (BDW 01673)
- Johann Ludwig Bach's Siehe, ich will meinen Engel senden, JLB 17 (1726, BDW 08310)

4 – Picander cycle, libretto planned for 1728:

- Gelobet sey der Herr (first libretto in the original 1728 print of the cycle; no known setting by Bach)

5 – Other and/or later:

- Freue dich, erlöste Schar, BWV 30 (1738)
- Lobt ihn mit Herz und Munde, BWV 220 (unknown composer)
- Johann Gottlieb Goldberg's Durch die herzliche Barmherzigkeit (1745–46, continuo part copied by Bach who was presumably Goldberg's teacher at the time; BDW 09155)

=== Visitation ===
Visitation, the visit of Mary with Elizabeth, including her song of praise, the Magnificat, is celebrated on 2 July.

1 – First cantata cycle, 1723:

- Herz und Mund und Tat und Leben, BWV 147 (adaptation of BWV 147a, a Weimar cantata for Advent IV, see above)
- Magnificat, BWV 243a (early version without Christmas interpolations possibly first performed on 2 July 1723)

2 – Chorale cantata cycle, 1724:

- Meine Seel erhebt den Herren, BWV 10

3 – Between second and fourth cycle:

- Meine Seele erhebet den Herrn (1725, cantata text by an unknown librettist without extant composition by Bach, BDW 01672)
- Johann Ludwig Bach's Der Herr wird ein Neues im Lande, JLB 13 (1726, BDW 08303)

4 – Picander cycle, libretto planned for 1728:

- Meine Seele erhebt den Herrn (no known setting by Bach)

5 – Other and/or later:

- Magnificat, BWV 243 (D major version: 2 July 1733?)
- Melchior Hoffmann's Meine Seele rühmt und preist, BWV 189 (BDW 00229) and Meine Seel erhebt den Herren, BWV Anh. 21 (a.k.a. Kleine Magnificat, BDW 01329)

=== St. Michael's Day ===
St. Michael's Day, i.e. Michaelmas (German: Michaelis), is celebrated on 29 September.

2 – Chorale cantata cycle, 1724:

- Herr Gott, dich loben alle wir, BWV 130

3 – Third cycle, 1726:

- Es erhub sich ein Streit, BWV 19

4 – Picander cycle, libretto originally planned for 1728, setting(s) 1729:

- Concerto, BWV 149/1a (previously known as BWV Anh. 198): opening movement of a cantata, considered to be the abandoned start of a setting of this libretto
- Man singet mit Freuden vom Sieg, BWV 149

5 – Other and/or later:

- BWV 130 restaged with a slightly modified instrumentation
- BWV 248 VI a (also indicated as BWV 248a) is a fragment of a nameless Michaeliskantate (Michaelmas cantata), likely first performed in 1734, shortly before its music was almost entirely adopted in the last part of the Christmas Oratorio (BWV 248 VI)
- Nun ist das Heil und die Kraft, BWV 50 (year and purpose unknown: movement of an incomplete or lost cantata, possibly for Michaelmas)
- Georg Philipp Telemann's Siehe, es hat überwunden der Löwe, TWV 1:1328 (misattributed to Bach as BWV 219)

=== Reformation Day ===
Reformation Day is celebrated on 31 October.

1 – First cycle, 1723:

- Early version of BWV 80/80b?

2 – Chorale cantata cycle:

- BWV 80 is a later addition to the chorale cantata cycle

3 – Third cycle, 1725:

- Gott der Herr ist Sonn und Schild, BWV 79

4 – Picander cycle:

- In 1728 Reformation Day coincided with Trinity XXIII (see above)

5 – Other and/or later:

- Ein feste Burg ist unser Gott, BWV 80 and early version 80b (c.1727–31 and later; chorale cantata later added to the chorale cantata cycle)
- BWV 129 no longer associated with Reformation Day.

== Occasions outside of the liturgical year ==
=== Consecration of church and organ ===
Revelation 21:2–8, the new Jerusalem
Luke 19:1–10, conversion of Zacchaeus

- Höchsterwünschtes Freudenfest, BWV 194, 2 November 1723 (consecration of Störmthal church and organ, adapted from BWV 194a, also Trinity Sunday)

=== New council ===
The election or inauguration of a new town council was celebrated with a service. Normally this was an annual event. The cantata written for such celebrations were indicated with the term Ratswechsel (changing of the council) or Ratswahl (election of the council).

- In Mühlhausen the celebration was held on 4 February:
  - 1708: Gott ist mein König, BWV 71 – Bach's first printed work.
  - 1709: second Ratswahl cantata for Mühlhausen, BWV 1138.1 (formerly BWV Anh. 192) – lost.
  - 1710: third Ratswahl cantata for Mühlhausen, BWV 1138.2 – lost.
- In Leipzig the service was held at the Nikolaikirche on the Monday following Bartholomew (Bartholomäus), 24 August:
  - Preise, Jerusalem, den Herrn, BWV 119, 30 August 1723
  - Wünschet Jerusalem Glück, BWV 1139.1 (formerly BWV Anh. 4), 27 August 1725 (reused 28 August 1741, only Picander's text extant)
  - Ihr Tore zu Zion, BWV 193 (= BWV 193.2), 25 August 1727
  - Gott, man lobet dich in der Stille, BWV 120 (= BWV 120.1), 1729 or earlier
  - Gott, gib dein Gerichte dem Könige, BWV 1140 (formerly BWV Anh. 3), 28 August 1730 (only Picander's text extant)
  - Wir danken dir, Gott, wir danken dir, BWV 29, 27 August 1731 (reused 31 August 1739 and 25 August 1749)
  - BWV 137 (chorale cantata for Trinity XII, see above): "A performance on 25.8.1732 (Spitta II, p. 286f. and others) on the occasion of inauguration of the new city council is not proved."
  - Herrscher des Himmels, König der Ehren, BWV 1141 (formerly BWV Anh. 193), 29 August 1740 (only text extant)
  - Lobe den Herrn, meine Seele, BWV 69 (= BWV 69.2), 26 August 1748 (adapted from BWV 69a = BWV 69.1)

=== Wedding ===
- Der Herr denket an uns, BWV 196, 5 June 1708?
- Sein Segen fließt daher wie ein Strom, BWV Anh. 14, 12 February 1725 (lost)
- Auf, süß entzückende Gewalt, BWV Anh. 196, 27 November 1725 (music lost)
- O ewiges Feuer, o Ursprung der Liebe, BWV 34a, 1726 (partly lost, probably for a wedding)
- Dem Gerechten muß das Licht, BWV 195, 1727–31?
- Der Herr ist freundlich dem, der auf ihn harret, BWV Anh. 211 18 January 1729 (music lost)
- Vergnügende Flammen, verdoppelt die Macht, BWV Anh. 212, 26 July 1729 (music lost)
- Herr Gott, Beherrscher aller Dinge, BWV 120a, 18 April 1729? (adapted from BWV 120, partly lost)
- Gott ist unsre Zuversicht, BWV 197, 1736/37 (partly based on 197a)

=== Funeral ===
- Gottes Zeit ist die allerbeste Zeit, BWV 106 (Actus tragicus), 1708? (funeral)
- Ich lasse dich nicht, du segnest mich denn, BWV 157, 6 February 1727 (funeral, also Purification)
- Laß, Fürstin, laß noch einen Strahl, BWV 198, 17 October 1727 (secular, funeral)
- Klagt, Kinder, klagt es aller Welt, BWV 244a, 24 March 1729 (music lost, related to the St Matthew Passion, funeral of Prince Leopold of Anhalt-Köthen)
- O Jesu Christ, meins Lebens Licht, BWV 118, c. 1736/1737 (funeral procession)

== Different occasions ==
- Nach dir, Herr, verlanget mich, BWV 150, ?before 1707 (Bußgottesdienst [Confession Service])
- Aus der Tiefen rufe ich, Herr, zu dir, BWV 131, 1707 (Bußgottesdienst [Confession service])
- Sei Lob und Ehr dem höchsten Gut, BWV 117, c. 1728–1731 (use unknown)
- Gott, man lobet dich in der Stille, BWV 120b, 26 June 1730 (second day of 200th anniversary of Augsburg Confession)
- Nun danket alle Gott, BWV 192, Autumn 1730 (partly lost, Reformation Day or wedding)
- Was Gott tut, das ist wohlgetan, BWV 100, c. 1732–1735 (use unknown)
- In allen meinen Taten, BWV 97, 25 July 1734 (5th Sunday after Trinity)
- Bekennen will ich seinen Namen, BWV 200, c. 1742 (fragment of lost cantata, possibly for Epiphany or Purification, arrangement of the Aria "Dein Kreuz, o Bräutgam meiner Seele" from the Passion Oratorio "Ein Lämmlein geht und trägt die Schuld" of Gottfried Heinrich Stölzel by Johann Sebastian Bach (Source: BJ 2008, p. 123, Peter Wollny))
- Tilge, Höchster, meine Sünden, BWV 1083, c. 1745–1747 (Bußgottesdienst [Confession service])

== Sources ==
- (BWV^{2a}) Alfred Dürr, Yoshitake Kobayashi (eds.), Kirsten Beißwenger. Bach Werke Verzeichnis: Kleine Ausgabe, nach der von Wolfgang Schmieder vorgelegten 2. Ausgabe. Preface in English and German. Wiesbaden: Breitkopf & Härtel, 1998. ISBN 3-7651-0249-0 – ISBN 978-3-7651-0249-3
- Dürr, Alfred (1971). Die Kantaten von Johann Sebastian Bach (in German). Vol. 1 (4 ed.). Deutscher Taschenbuchverlag. ISBN 3-423-04080-7.
- Alfred Dürr: Johann Sebastian Bach: Die Kantaten. Bärenreiter, Kassel 1999, ISBN 3-7618-1476-3 (in German)
- Dürr, Alfred (2006). The Cantatas of J. S. Bach: With Their Librettos in German-English Parallel Text. Translated by Richard D. P. Jones. Oxford University Press. ISBN 978-0-19-929776-4.
- Geck, Martin (2006). Johann Sebastian Bach: Life and Work. Translated by John Hargraves. Harcourt. ISBN 978-0-15-100648-9.
- Jones, Richard D. P. (2007). The Creative Development of Johann Sebastian Bach, Volume I: 1695–1717: Music to Delight the Spirit. Oxford University Press. ISBN 978-0-19-816440-1.
- Taruskin, Richard (2010). Music in the Seventeenth and Eighteenth Centuries. The Oxford History of Western Music. Vol. 2. New York: Oxford University Press. ISBN 978-0-19-538482-6.
- Wolff, Christoph (2002). Johann Sebastian Bach: The Learned Musician. Oxford University Press. ISBN 978-0-393-32256-9.
- Gardiner, John Eliot (2007). "Cantatas for Easter Sunday, Easter Monday and Easter Tuesday / Georgenkirche, Eisenach" (PDF). Bach-Cantatas.
- Gardiner, John Eliot (2007). "For the First Sunday after Easter" (PDF). Monteverdi Choir. Archived from the original (PDF) on 4 March 2016.
- "Joh. Seb. Bach's Kirchencantaten; Bd. 1 / No. 1 – 10". Universitätsbibliothek Heidelberg.
- Werner Neumann: Handbuch der Kantaten J.S.Bachs, 1947, 5th ed. 1984, ISBN 3-7651-0054-4
- Hans-Joachim Schulze: Die Bach-Kantaten: Einführungen zu sämtlichen Kantaten Johann Sebastian Bachs (in German)
- Christoph Wolff/Ton Koopman: Die Welt der Bach-Kantaten Verlag J.B. Metzler, Stuttgart, Weimar 2006 ISBN 978-3-476-02127-4 (in German)
- Bach Cantatas for Sundays and Holidays during the Liturgical Year Carus-Verlag, Stuttgart
