= Freue dich, erlöste Schar, BWV 30 =

Church cantata by Johann Sebastian Bach

Freue dich, erlöste Schar
- BWV 30 • 30.2
- Church cantata by J. S. Bach
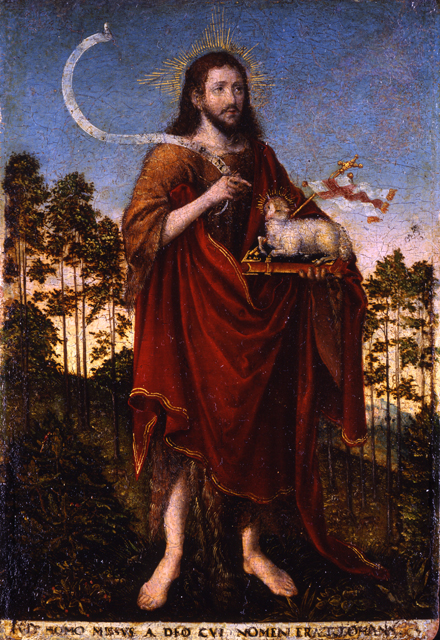
- There was a man, named Johannes, who was sent by God by Lucas Cranach the Elder, c. 1551
- Related: based on Angenehmes Wiederau
- Cantata text: Possibly Christian Friedrich Henrici (Picander)
- Chorale: Tröstet, tröstet meine Lieben, by Johann Olearius
- Performed: 24 June 1738: Leipzig
- Movements: 12
- Vocal: SATB choir and solo
- Instrumental: 3 trumpets; timpani; 2 flauti traversi; 2 oboes; oboe d'amore; 2 violins; viola; continuo

Freue dich, erlöste Schar (Rejoice, redeemed flock), BWV 30.2, BWV 30, is a church cantata by Johann Sebastian Bach. It is one of his later realisations in the genre: he composed it for the Feast of John the Baptist (24 June) in 1738, and based its music largely on Angenehmes Wiederau, a secular cantata which he had composed a year earlier. Christian Friedrich Henrici (Picander), the librettist of the secular model of the cantata, is likely also the author of the sacred cantata's version of the text.

The cantata's outer choral movements, and its four arias, are parodied from the secular work. Bach recomposed the five recitatives, and added a chorale as conclusion of the first half of the cantata. The cantata is scored for soprano, alto, tenor and bass singers, woodwinds, strings, and continuo. While the earlier composition had also trumpets and timpani in its outer movements, Bach did not copy these parts in his autograph score of the sacred version of the work. Later it was suggested, likely not by the composer, that these parts could be added ad libitum. The 19th-century publication of the cantata by the Bach Gesellschaft (Bach-Gesellschaft Ausgabe, BGA) included these parts in the printed score.

== Context ==
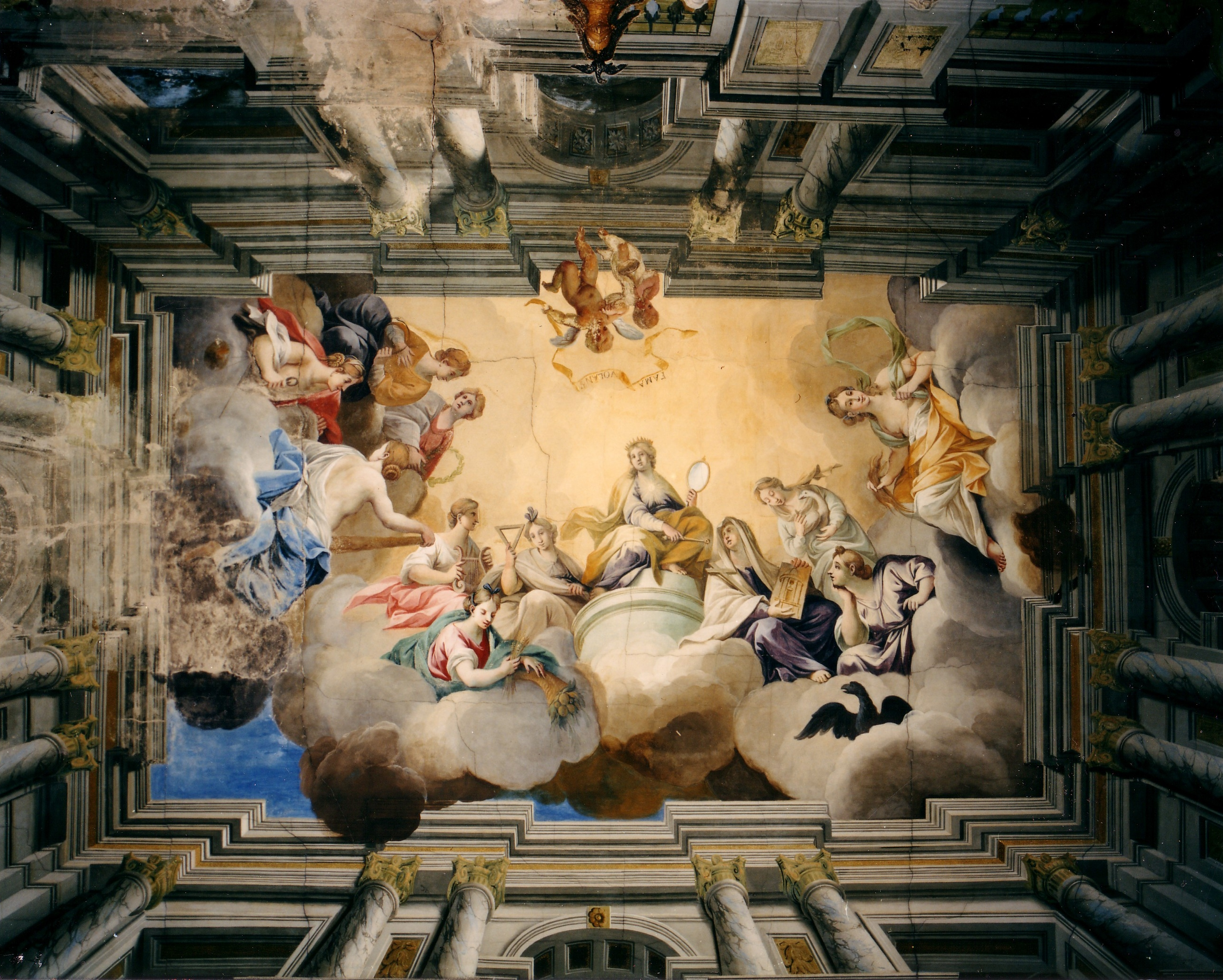
In 1737 Bach had composed Angenehmes Wiederau, BWV 30.1, the secular model for Freue dich, erlöste Schar, for performance at Wiederau manor (ceiling of its two-storey high celebration hall pictured).

Bach composed Freue dich, erlöste Schar, a cantata for St. John's Day (24 June), in Leipzig, where the traditional readings from scripture for the feast day were, from the Book of Isaiah: "the voice of a preacher in the desert" (Isaiah 40:1–5), and from the Gospel of Luke: the birth of John the Baptist and the Benedictus of Zechariah (Luke 1:57–80). Bach based the cantata on a secular cantata, Angenehmes Wiederau, BWV 30.1 (previously BWV 30a), which he had composed in 1737 to celebrate Johann Christian von Hennicke's acquisition of Wiederau manor. It is assumed that the sacred parody was realised the next year, and first performed on St. John's Day of that year.

Freue dich, erlöste Schar belongs to the period of Bach's late church cantata production, an era when he composed, as far as known, mostly isolated cantatas that were either an addition to one of his earlier cycles, or a recasting of earlier work. In the 1730s, parody texts for vocal music which Bach had previously composed for another occasion were often delivered by Christian Friedrich Henrici, known under the pen name Picander, as seems to have been the case for BWV 30.2 too. Possibly the cantata was a late addition to the third cycle: in the third cycle year 1726 Bach had performed Siehe, ich will meinen Engel senden, JLB 17, a St. John's Day cantata by his cousin Johann Ludwig, so he may have wished to complement that cycle with one of his own compositions.

The third stanza of Johann Olearius's 1671 hymn "Tröstet, tröstet meine Lieben" is the text of the chorale movement which closes the first part of the cantata, using "Freu dich sehr, o meine Seele", Zahn No. 6543, as hymn tune. This melody, based on an older tune, first appeared in its chorale form as a setting of Psalm 42 by Louis Bourgeois, in the 1551 edition of the Genevan Psalter (Pseaumes octante trois de David). The sixth movement of BWV 30.2 is, as far as known, the eighth and last time Bach adopted this chorale melody in one of his compositions: he used it, with various hymn texts, in seven four-part harmonizations and as a cantus firmus by the alto in the third movement of Meine Seufzer, meine Tränen, BWV 13.

== Composition ==
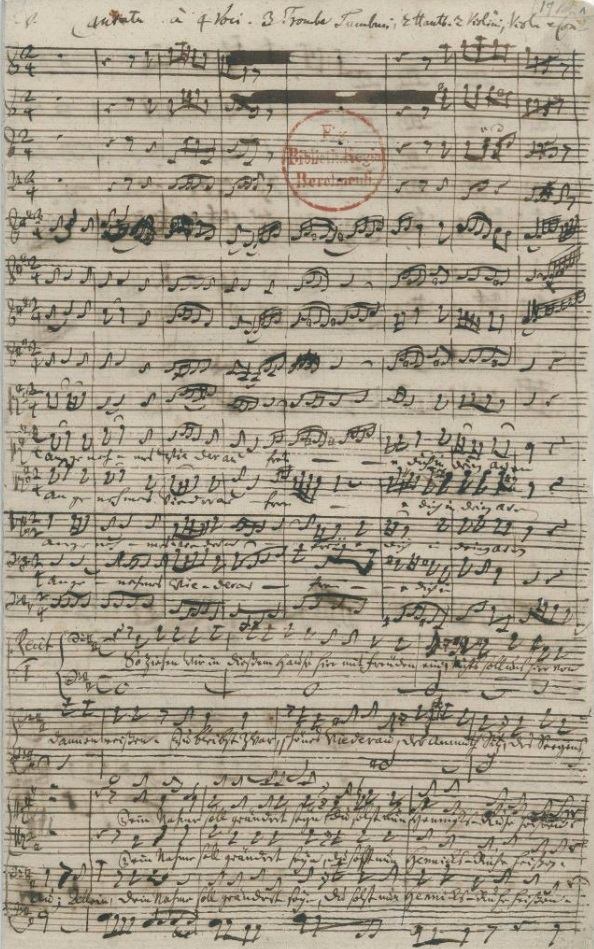
First page of Bach's autograph score of BWV 30.1, showing the parts for trumpets and timpani in the uppermost four staves, the parts which were omitted by the composer in the BWV 30.2 version of the same music.

Bach scored the cantata for four vocal soloists (soprano, alto, tenor, bass), a four-part choir, two traversos, two oboes, oboe d'amore, concertato violin, accompanying strings (two violin parts and one viola part) and basso continuo. The three trumpets and timpani that played in the outer movements of the cantata's secular model, were not copied in Bach's autograph of the sacred work, but could be added ad libitum to the respective movements of that version of the work, as the Bach-Gesellschaft did when they published the composition. In 1752, two years after Bach's death, his son Wilhelm Friedemann added reworked parts for two trumpets and timpani in these movements, and applied some other changes, for a performance in Halle.

The cantata is in twelve movements, divided in two parts, to be performed before and after the sermon. In his translation of Alfred Dürr's standard work on Bach's cantatas, Richard D. P. Jones describes the over-all mood of the cantata as "joyful, relaxed and unproblematic", with a dance-like character appearing in the arias. A performance of the cantata takes around 40 minutes.

=== Part I ===
Movements of Freue dich, erlöste Schar, Part I
| No. | Title | Type | Vocal | Winds | Strings | Brass | Percussion | Key | Time |
|---|---|---|---|---|---|---|---|---|---|
| 1 | Freue dich, erlöste Schar | Chorus | SATB | 2 flutes, 2 oboes | 2 violins, viola, basso continuo | 3 trumpets | Timpani | D major | 2/4 |
| 2 | Wir haben Rast | Recitative | Bass | | Basso continuo | | | | 4/4 |
| 3 | Gelobet sei Gott, gelobet sein Name | Aria | Bass | | 2 violins, viola, basso continuo | | | G major | 3/8 |
| 4 | Der Herold kömmt und meldt den König an | Recitative | Alto | | Basso continuo | | | | 4/4 |
| 5 | Kommt, ihr angefochtnen Sünder | Aria | Alto | Flute | 2 violins, viola, basso continuo | | | A major | 4/4 |
| 6 | Eine Stimme lässt sich hören | Chorale | SATB | 2 flute (col soprano), 2 oboes (col soprano) | Violin (col soprano), violin (coll'alto), viola (col tenore), basso continuo | | | A major | 4/4 |

The opening chorus is in D major and displays continuous dynamic musical movement. It adopts a syncopated introductory rhythm that later reappears in the alto aria. The form is between a da capo and a rondo: the A section appears in the middle of the B section. The movement also reverses expectations regarding introductions, beginning with a combined vocal and instrumental thematic statement before presenting it without voices.

All of the recitatives in Part I are secco. The "dazzling and brilliant" bass aria of Part I is characterized by triplet figures and includes full string accompaniment in roulades. It includes the same foundational motive as the alto aria, and is formally in modified ternary. The alto aria is remarkable for its binary-form ritornello and "blues-like" final cadence; structurally, the movement is a gavotte. Craig Smith notes that "one can hardly think of another Bach aria that so profoundly illustrates a state of grace. The gentle dance rhythms are celestial and heavenly in their inexorable progress". Part I concludes with the cantata's only chorale.

=== Part II ===
Movements of Freue dich, erlöste Schar, Part II
| No. | Title | Type | Vocal | Winds | Strings | Brass | Percussion | Key | Time |
|---|---|---|---|---|---|---|---|---|---|
| 7 | So bist du denn, mein Heil, bedacht | Recitative | Bass | 2 oboes | Basso continuo | | | E minor | 4/4 |
| 8 | Ich will nun hassen | Aria | Bass | Oboe d'amore | 3 violins, viola, basso continuo | | | B minor | 2/4 |
| 9 | Und obwohl sonst der Unbestand | Recitative | Soprano | | Basso continuo | | | | 4/4 |
| 10 | Eilt, ihr Stunden, kommt herbei | Aria | Soprano | | Violin, basso continuo | | | E minor | 9/8 |
| 11 | Geduld, der angenehme Tag | Recitative | Tenor | | Basso continuo | | | | 4/4 |
| 12 | Freue dich, geheilgte Schar | Chorus | SATB | Two flutes, two oboes | 2 violin, viola, basso continuo | 3 trumpets | Timpani | D major | 2/4 |

Part II opens with the cantata's only recitativo accompagnato, for bass with oboes and continuo. This prepares a bass aria, which opens with an "aggressive 'scotch snap'" that repeats throughout the movement. A secco soprano recitative prepares a 9/8 soprano aria with chromatic bass, gigue rhythms, and an operatic style. The penultimate movement is a tenor recitative with "elongated phrases and weird chromatic harmonies", representing a tortured soul. The piece concludes with a repetition of the chorus on a different text.

== Reception ==
Both Wilhelm Friedemann Bach and his brother Carl Philipp Emanuel performed the work in the second half of the 18th century: the former in Halle in 1752, and the latter in Hamburg in 1780. After the publication of the cantata in the second half of the 19th century, it was for instance performed in the Gewandhaus in Leipzig.

=== Publication ===
The Bach Gesellschaft published the cantata in 1855, edited by Wilhelm Rust, as last cantata in their third volume of church cantatas. In 1866 Robert Franz published a vocal score (with his piano reduction of the orchestral material) of the cantata, which in the first half of the 20th century was republished with an English translation by Alfred G. Langley (Sing For Joy ye Ransomed Band).

Frieder Rempp edited the cantata for the New Bach Edition, which included the cantata in the 29th volume of its first series (score: 1982; critical commentary: 1984). The composer's autograph scores (P 43 and 44) and performance parts (St 31) of both the secular and sacred versions of the work are conserved in the Berlin State Library: digitized facsimiles of these manuscripts have been made available online, as well at that Library's website as at the Bach Digital platform.

=== Recordings ===
- Heinrich-Schütz-Chor Heilbronn / Württembergisches Kammerorchester Heilbronn, Fritz Werner. Les Grandes Cantates de J. S. Bach Vol. 26. Erato, 1972.
- Münchener Bach-Chor / Münchener Bach-Orchester, Karl Richter. Bach Cantatas Vol. 3 – Ascension Day, Whitsun, Trinity. Archiv Produktion, 1975.
- Gächinger Kantorei / Württembergisches Kammerorchester Heilbronn, Helmuth Rilling. Die Bach Kantate Vol. 9. Hänssler, 1984.
- Holland Boys Choir / Netherlands Bach Collegium, Pieter Jan Leusink. Bach Edition Vol. 15 – Cantatas Vol. 8. Brilliant Classics, 2000.
- Monteverdi Choir / English Baroque Soloists, John Eliot Gardiner. Bach Cantatas Vol. 1: City of London. Soli Deo Gloria, 2000.
- Amsterdam Baroque Orchestra & Choir, Ton Koopman. J. S. Bach: Complete Cantatas Vol. 22. Antoine Marchand, 2002.
- Montréal Baroque, Eric J. Milnes. Bach Cantates De Saint-Jean Baptiste. ATMA Classique, 2004.
- Bach Collegium Japan, Masaaki Suzuki. J. S. Bach: Complete Cantatas Vol. 55. BIS, 2013 (SACD hybrid).
- J. S. Bach-Stiftung, Rudolf Lutz. Freue dich, erlöste Schar: BWV 30. Switzerland: Gallus Media, 2016 (DVD).
