= Nun danket alle Gott, BWV 192 =

1730 church cantata by J. S. Bach

Nun danket alle Gott
- BWV 192
- Chorale cantata by J. S. Bach
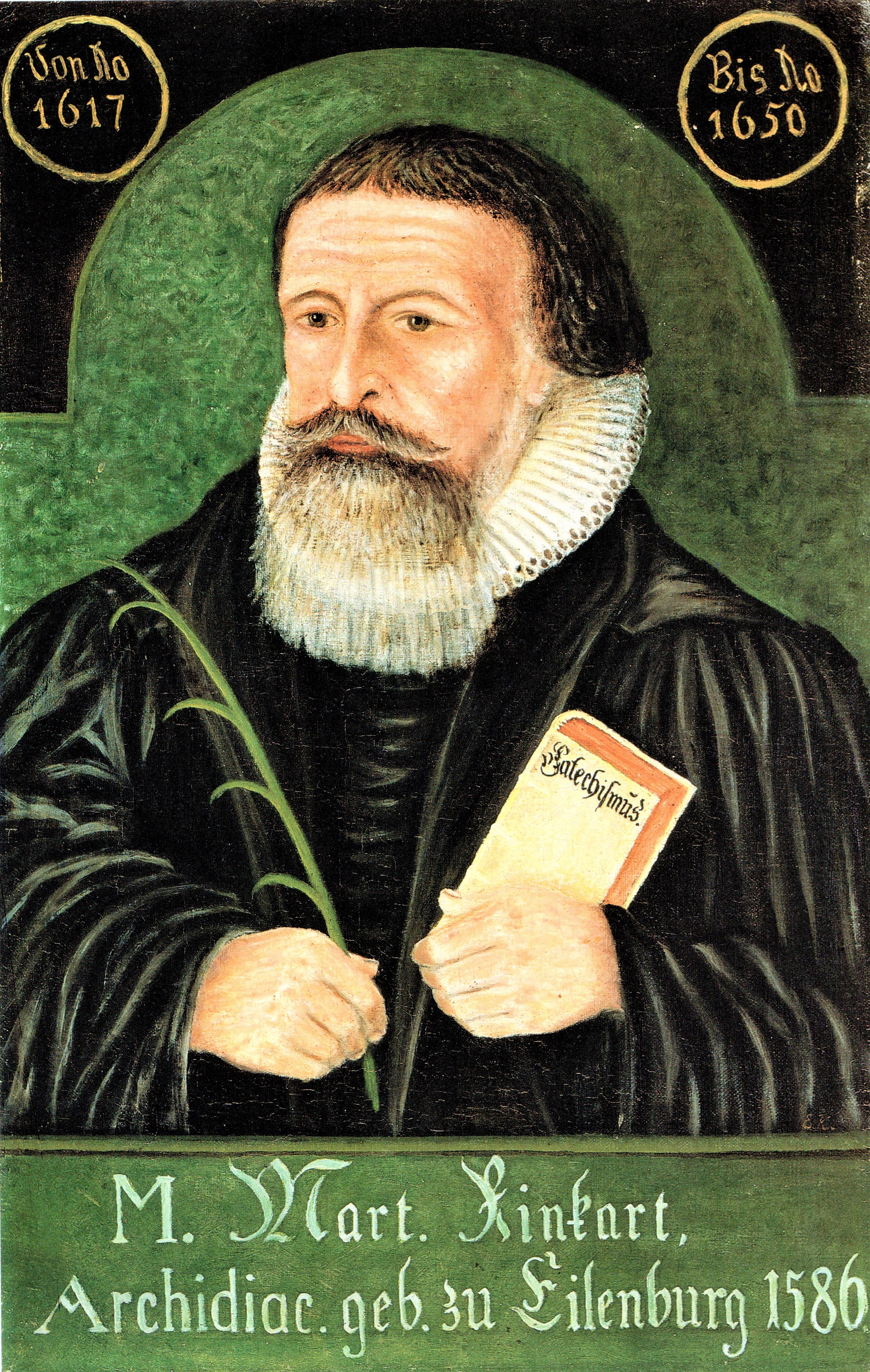
- Martin Rinckart, author of the text
- Occasion: Trinity Sunday
- Chorale: "Nun danket alle Gott"
- Performed: 4 June 1730: Leipzig
- Movements: 5
- Vocal: SATB choir; solo: soprano and bass
- Instrumental: 2 flauto traverso; 2 oboes; 2 violins; viola; continuo

Nun danket alle Gott (Now thank ye all our God), BWV 192, is a church cantata for Trinity Sunday composed by Johann Sebastian Bach in Leipzig in 1730. It is an incomplete cantata, because its tenor part is missing. It is a chorale cantata, setting the unmodified three stanzas of Martin Rinckart's "Nun danket alle Gott" ("Now Thank We All Our God"). It has been regarded as an expansion of Bach's chorale cantata cycle.

== History and text ==
Bach composed Nun danket alle Gott as a chorale cantata for Trinity, setting the unmodified text of the three stanzas of Martin Rinckart's hymn of thanksgiving "Nun danket alle Gott". It was first performed on 4 June 1730. Alfred Dürr assumed that it could have been written for a wedding. It has also been regarded as a cantata for Reformation Day.

The cantata is not always seen as included in Bach's chorale cantata cycle. The original score is held by the Staatsbibliothek zu Berlin. The tenor part was lost and has been reconstructed by several scholars; e.g., Günter Raphael and Alfred Dürr.

== Scoring and structure ==
The cantata is scored for soprano and bass soloists, a four-part choir, two flutes, two oboes, two violins, viola, and basso continuo.

The work has three movements:

1. Chorus: Nun danket alle Gott
2. Duet aria (soprano and bass): Der ewig reiche Gott
3. Chorus: Lob, Ehr und Preis sei Gott

== Music ==
The cantata begins with a chorale fantasia. Unusually, the ritornello is not immediately followed by the chorale melody, but by a three-part or even four-part imitative preparation. The first phrase of the chorale melody appears in the soprano over further imitation in the lower voices and by staccato chords in the accompaniment. The other lines of the chorale are handled similarly.

The duet aria is introduced by a ritornello "with a double hiatus suggestive of modesty or diffidence". The movement is structurally like a da capo aria but lacks a contrasting middle section.

Unusually, the work ends not with a closing chorale, but with another chorale fantasia with a "rollicking gigue melody". Again, the soprano carries the chorale melody. As in the first movement, the lower voices sing imitative lines.

== Recordings ==
- Amsterdam Baroque Orchestra & Choir, Ton Koopman. J. S. Bach: Complete Cantatas Vol. 20. Antoine Marchand, 2002.
- Bach Collegium Japan, Masaaki Suzuki. J. S. Bach: Cantatas Vol. 51. BIS, 2011.
- Frankfurter Kantorei / Bach-Collegium Stuttgart, Helmuth Rilling. Die Bach Kantate Vol. 12. Hänssler, 1974.
- Holland Boys Choir / Netherlands Bach Collegium, Pieter Jan Leusink. Bach Edition Vol. 12. Brilliant Classics, 1999.
- Monteverdi Choir / English Baroque Soloists, John Eliot Gardiner. Bach Cantatas Vol. 10. Soli Deo Gloria, 2000.
