= Ehre sei dir, Gott, gesungen, BWV 248 V =

Church cantata by Johann Sebastian Bach

Ehre sei dir, Gott, gesungen (Let honour be sung to You, O God), BWV 248^{V} (also written as BWV 248 V), is a church cantata for the second Sunday after Christmas, which Johann Sebastian Bach composed as the fifth part of his Christmas Oratorio, written for the Christmas season of 1734–35 in Leipzig. The Christmas cantata was first performed on 2 January 1735. Bach was then Thomaskantor, responsible for music at four churches in Leipzig, a position he had assumed in 1723.

== History ==
Bach had been presenting church cantatas for the Christmas season in the Thomaskirche (St. Thomas) and Nikolaikirche (St. Nicholas) since his appointment as director musices in Leipzig in 1723, including these cantatas for the Sunday after New Year's Day:

- As part of his first cantata cycle: Schau, lieber Gott, wie meine Feind, BWV 153, first performed on 2 January 1724.
- As part of his third cantata cycle: Ach Gott, wie manches Herzeleid, BWV 58 (early version), first performed on 5 January 1727, and in its later version, first performed on 4 January 1733 or 3 January 1734, added to the chorale cantata cycle.

=== Christmas season 1734–35 ===
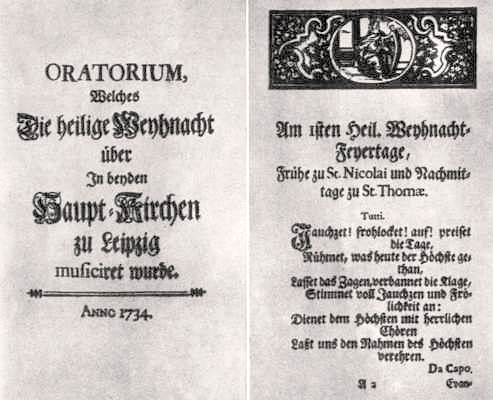
First two pages of the libretto of Bach's Christmas Oratorio, as printed in 1734

Bach composed his Christmas Oratorio for the Christmas season from Christmas Day on 25 December 1734 to Epiphany on 6 January 1735. Ehre sei dir, Gott, gesungen, BWV 248 V, for the Sunday after New Year's Day, is the fifth of six cantatas (or parts) constituting this oratorio.

=== Text ===
The readings for the Sunday were as the epistle 1 Peter 4:12–19, the suffering of Christians, and as the Gospel Matthew 2:13–23, the Flight into Egypt. The text of Part V, deviating from these readings, deals with the voyage of the Magi, following the Gospel of Matthew, 1–6, with interspersed reflecting recitatives, arias and chorales.

The identity of the librettist of the Christmas Oratorio cantatas is unknown, with Picander, who had collaborated with Bach earlier, a likely candidate. The oratorio's libretto was published in 1734. The quotations from the Bible are rendered in Martin Luther's translation.

== Music and content ==
BWV 248 V is scored for 2 oboes d'amore, 2 violin parts, 1 viola part and continuo.

Christmas Oratorio Part V: For the First Sunday in the New Year (Note: Part V is meant to be performed on the Sunday between New Year's Day and Epiphany on 6 January; in some years there is no such day, e.g in 2017, 2018 & 2019.)
No.		Key	Time	Incipit	Scoring	Model
43	Chorus	A maj/F♯ min	3/4	Ehre sei dir, Gott, gesungen	Oboe d'amore I, II, strings, continuo	
44	Recitative (Evangelist, tenor)			Da Jesus geboren war zu Bethlehem	Continuo	Matthew 2:1
45	Chorus; Recitative (alto); Chorus	D major	common time	Wo ist der neugeborne König der Juden; Sucht ihn in meiner Brust; Wir haben seinen Stern gesehen	Oboe d'amore I, II, strings, continuo	Matthew 2:2; BWV 247/43: "Pfui dich, wie fein zerbrichst du den Tempel" (conjectured).
46	Chorale	A major	common time	Dein Glanz all' Finsternis verzehrt	Oboe d'amore I, II, strings, continuo	Nun liebe Seel, nun ist es Zeit (Weissel 1642), v. 5; Zahn 2461c (1581)
47	Aria (bass)	F♯ minor	2/4	Erleucht' auch meine finstre Sinnen	Oboe d'amore I solo, organ senza continuo	BWV 215/7: "Durch die von Eifer entflammeten Waffen"
48	Recitative (Evangelist, tenor)			Da das der König Herodes hörte	Continuo	Matthew 2:3
49	Recitative (alto)			Warum wollt ihr erschrecken	Strings, continuo	
50	Recitative (Evangelist, tenor)			Und ließ versammeln alle Hohenpriester	Continuo	Matthew 2:4-6
51	Trio (sopr., alto, ten.)	B minor	2/4	Ach! wann wird die Zeit erscheinen?	Violin I solo, continuo	unknown
52	Recitative (alto)			Mein Liebster herrschet schon	Continuo	
53	Chorale	A major	common time	Zwar ist solche Herzensstube	Oboe d'amore I, II, strings, continuo	Ihr Gestirn, ihr hohlen Lüfte (Franck 1655), v. 9; Zahn 3614b (1687)
