= Herr, wenn die stolzen Feinde schnauben, BWV 248 VI =

1735 cantata by J. S. Bach, part 6 of his Christmas Oratorio

Herr, wenn die stolzen Feinde schnauben
- Part VI of Christmas Oratorio
- Christmas cantata by J. S. Bach
- Catalogue: BWV 248 VI
- Text: Matthew 2:7–12; "Ich steh an deiner Krippen hier"; "Nun seid ihr wohl gerochen"
- Performed: 6 January 1735: Leipzig
- Movements: 9
- Vocal: SATB choir and soloists
- Instrumental: 3 trumpets; timpani; 2 oboes; 2 oboes d'amore; 2 violins; viola; cello; violone; continuo

Herr, wenn die stolzen Feinde schnauben (Lord, when our insolent enemies snort), BWV 248^{VI} (also written as BWV 248 VI), is a church cantata by Johann Sebastian Bach, composed for Epiphany as the sixth part of his Christmas Oratorio for the Christmas season of 1734–35 in Leipzig. The cantata was first performed in two major churches there on 6 January 1735.

The topic of Part VI follows the Gospel of Matthew, telling of the Adoration of the Magi. Bach scored it for a festive orchestra, with all instruments from Part I except the flutes. Its exceptional closing chorale, with the voices embedded in an orchestral concerto dominated by the first trumpet, closes not only the cantata but also the oratorio.

== History ==
Bach was Thomaskantor, responsible for church music at four churches in Leipzig, a position he had assumed in 1723. Bach had presented church cantatas for the Christmas season in the Thomaskirche and Nikolaikirche, including two cantatas for Epiphany:

- As part of his first cantata cycle: Sie werden aus Saba alle kommen, BWV 65, first performed in 1724.
- As part of his second cantata cycle: Liebster Immanuel, Herzog der Frommen, BWV 123, first performed in 1725.

For the oratorio, the libretto by an unknown author followed the Nativity of Jesus from the Gospel of Matthew, interspersed with reflective texts for recitatives and arias, and stanzas from two Lutheran hymns.

Bach led the first performances with the Thomanerchor at the two main churches of Leipzig on 6 January 1735.

=== Cantata fragment BWV 248 VI a ===
BWV 248 VI a, also indicated as BWV 248a, is a fragment of a cantata, transmitted without text, the opening chorus of which Bach likely borrowed from So kämpfet nur, ihr muntern Töne, BWV 1160, one of his secular cantatas. Picander wrote the libretto of the BWV 1160 cantata (also known as BWV Anh. 10), which otherwise, that is, apart from the likely borrowed opening chorus, survived without music. It was first performed on 25 August 1731, for the birthday of Joachim Friedrich von Flemming.

The cantata transmitted in the BWV 248a fragment, consisting of four revised performance parts in the bundle of contemporary performance material for BWV 248 VI, is a sacred cantata for Michaelmas (29 September), likely first performed in 1734. While nothing more survives of the Michaelmas cantata as such, the four revised performance parts show that most of its music, including the music of its opening chorus and recitatives, was parodied in Part VI of the Christmas Oratorio.

== Music ==
=== Structure and scoring ===
The cantata is structured in 11 movements. An extended choral introduction is followed by two scenes. Both scenes are composed of a quotation from the Gospel of Matthew, a recitative reflecting the narration, an aria-like prayer or meditation, and a chorale setting a stanza from a Lutheran hymn. Bach scored the cantata for three vocal soloists, a four-part choir and a festive Baroque orchestra with trumpets, timpani, oboes and strings. A tenor soloist narrates the Biblical story in secco recitative, as the Evangelist. There are two chorales: a four-part setting of Paul Gerhardt's "Ich steh an deiner Krippen hier" and a closing chorale with an independent orchestra, "Nun seid ihr wohl gerochen".

BWV 248 VI is scored for three trumpets (Tr), timpani (Ti), two oboes (Ob), two oboes d'amore (Oa), two violin parts (Vl), a viola part (Va) and continuo. In the following table, the continuo, playing throughout, is not shown.

Movements of Herr, wenn die stolzen Feinde schnauben
No.	Title	Text	Type	Vocal	Brass	Winds	Strings	Key	Time
54	Herr, wenn die stolzen Feinde schnauben	anon.	Chorus	SATB	3Tr Ti	2Ob	2Vl Va	D major	3/8
55	Da berief Herodes die Weisen heimlich / Ziehet hin und forschet fleißig	Matthew 2:7-8	Recitative	Ev. Herod					common time
56	Du Falscher, suche nur den Herrn zu fällen	anon.	Recitative	S			2Vl Va		common time
57	Nur ein Wink von seinen Händen	anon.	Aria	S		Oa	2Vl Va	A major	3/4
58	Als sie nun den König gehöret hatten	Matthew 2:9-11	Recitative	Ev.					common time
59	Ich steh an deiner Krippen hier	Gerhardt	Chorale	SATB		2Ob	Vl Va	G major	common time
60	Und Gott befahl ihnen im Traum	Matthew 2:12	Recitative	Ev.					common time
61	So geht! Genug, mein Schatz geht nicht von hier	anon.	Recitative	T		2Oa			common time
62	Nun mögt ihr stolzen Feinde schrecken	anon.	Aria	T		2Oa		B minor	2/4
63	Ach mein herzliebes Jesulein	anon.	Recitative	S A T B				D major	common time
64	Nun seid ihr wohl gerochen	Werner	Chorale	SATB	3Tr Ti	2Ob	2Vl Va	D major	common time
