= Nun ist das Heil und die Kraft, BWV 50 =

Single-movement cantata attributed to J S Bach

Nun ist das Heil und die Kraft (Now is [come] salvation and strength), BWV 50, is a choral movement long attributed to Johann Sebastian Bach and assumed to be part of a lost cantata.

The text and scoring point towards its being written for a Michaelmas celebration. In Leipzig, where Bach was employed from 1723, the feast was celebrated with large-scale church music and also a trade fair. American Bach scholar William H. Scheide suggested that the work was written in 1723, Bach's first year in the city. However, the exact dates of composition and first performance are unknown.

== History and text ==
The work was first published in 1860 in a volume of cantatas, part of the first complete edition of Bach's music, the Bach-Gesellschaft Ausgabe (BGA). It has fascinated Bach scholars because of questions about its provenance. No autograph sources exist, and the earliest copies extant do not mention Bach's name. In 1982, Scheide argued that the existing version (for double choir) is an arrangement by an unknown hand of a lost original for five voices by J. S. Bach. His argument was based on irregularities in BWV 50's part-writing, which are highly unlike the writing of Bach. In 2000, the American performer and scholar Joshua Rifkin argued that a more plausible solution of this puzzle is that the author of BWV 50 was not Bach at all, but an unknown (but highly gifted) composer of the era. The suggestion is controversial.

The prescribed readings for Michaelmas were from Revelation 12:7–12 and Matthew 18:1–11; this movement draws from Revelation 12:10. Its text is "Nun ist das Heil und die Kraft und das Reich und die Macht unsers Gottes seines Christus worden, weil der verworfen ist, der sie verklagete Tag und Nacht vor Gott".

== Scoring ==
The movement is a chorus, or "coro doppio", for two four-part choirs. The piece requires a relatively large baroque orchestra; three trumpets, timpani, three oboes, two violins, viola, and basso continuo. Bach cantatas known to be written for Michaelmas share similar "festive" instrumentation, for example Herr Gott, dich loben alle wir, BWV 130, performed in 1724.

== Music ==
Like other cantatas for Michaelmas, it features texture layering from the lowest range to the highest, and a contrapuntal representation of "battles and massing armies". It is in two distinct sections and uses fugal techniques.

The movement begins with a "strong declaration in unharmonized octaves", pairing the low strings with the bass voice of the first choir. A rhythmic shift creates a "floating, turn-around feeling" before the tenor line enters, followed by alto and soprano. As this choir shifts into rhythmic counterpoint, the second choir, trumpet, and oboes enter. The movement also incorporates call-and-response, military-like tattoos, and an inversion of the previous order of thematic entry. The final twelve bars adopt a chromatic style not heard earlier in the piece.

== Recordings ==
- Berliner Philharmonischer Chor / Berliner Philharmoniker, Carl Schuricht. J. S. Bach: Motet, Singet dem Herrn; Cantata No. 50; Cantata No. 104. Telefunken, 1934/8.
- Dresden Cathedral Choir & Orchestra, Kurt Bauer. Bach: Cantatas Nos. 31 & 50. Janus Piroquette, 1960s–70s.
- Leeds Festival Choir / London Symphony Orchestra, Hugh P. Allen. "Now Shall The Grace", Eight-part chorus from Cantata No. 50. HMV, 1928.
- Monteverdi Choir / English Baroque Soloists, John Eliot Gardiner. J. S. Bach: Motets & Cantatas. Erato, 1980.
- Stuttgarter Chor & Orchester, Marcel Couraud. J. S. Bach: Cantata No. 21, Cantata No. 50. Les Discophiles français, 1955.
- The Sixteen, Harry Christophers, J. S. Bach: Cantata No. 34, 50 and 147, Coro, 1992.
