= Tempus clausum =

The closed time (Latin: Tempus clausum), in the ancient Roman Catholic law : forbidden time (lat. Tempus feriatum) as well, denominates the penitential periods in the liturgical year, Lent and Advent.

During this closed time the believers shall prepare in their personal lifestyle through prayer, penance, repentance, almsgiving, and self-denial for the solemnity days. During these days dancing and festival celebrations had been banned. This comprised also larger wedding celebrations, while silent marriages, not celebrated in the public, are allowed.

During the creative period of Johann Sebastian Bach in Leipzig, no figural or florid church music, such as his cantatas, was performed in Advent from the second to the fourth Sunday in Advent, and in Lent from the first Sunday in Lent (Invocavit) to Palm Sunday (Palmarum), with the exception of the feast of the Annunciation on 25 March.

The periods in question and penitential canons varied at different times. The restriction no longer figures in Roman Catholic canon law, but survives in Lutheranism.
