= Gott ist unsre Zuversicht, BWV 197 =

1737 Bach cantata

Gott ist unsre Zuversicht (God is our confidence), BWV 197.2 (formerly BWV 197), is a church cantata by Johann Sebastian Bach.

== History and text ==
In 1728 in Leipzig, Bach composed a Christmas cantata, Ehre sei Gott in der Höhe, BWV 197.1 (Glory be to God in the Highest), which he revised in 1736–37 into this wedding cantata. Movement 5 is a chorale stanza by Martin Luther, the final movement is by Georg Neumark; the rest of the poetry is anonymous.

== Scoring and structure ==
The cantata is scored for three vocal soloists (soprano, alto, and bass), a four-part choir, three trumpets, timpani, two oboes, two oboes d'amore, bassoon, two violins, viola, and basso continuo.

The work's ten movements are divided into two parts of five movements each, to be performed before and after the wedding sermon.

Part 1

1. Chorus: Gott ist unsre Zuversicht
2. Recitative (bass): Gott ist und bleibt der beste Sorger
3. Aria (alto): Schläfert allen Sorgenkummer
4. Recitative (bass): Drum folget Gott und seinem Triebe
5. Chorale: Du süße Lieb, schenk uns deine Gunst

Part 2

6. Aria (bass): O du angenehmes Paar
7. Recitative (soprano): So wie es Gott mit dir
8. Aria (soprano): Vergnügen und Lust
9. Recitative (bass): Und dieser frohe Lebenslauf
10. Chorale: So wandelt froh auf Gottes Wegen

== Music ==
The opening movement is a chorus in da capo form with a prominent trumpet part and an active violin line. The vocal parts use fugal techniques. The bass recitative is secco and "set to a melody of almost childlike naivety and simplicity". The alto aria's structure combines elements of da capo and ritornello form; the instrumental introduction does not completely recur and the reprise differs significantly from the opening section. The fourth movement is a bass recitative with chordal strings. The section closes with a four-part setting of the chorale tune with varied phrase lengths.

The second section opens with a bass aria that "has a lavishness of sound which is almost unparalleled". A two-part secco soprano recitative leads to an aria that was for bass in BWV 197.1 but in BWV 197.2 is scored for soprano. The aria is in the style of a siciliano. The penultimate movement is a bass recitative with chordal oboes and interjecting strings. The final chorale setting is relatively simple and in minor mode.

== Recordings (selection) ==
- Max van Egmond (bass soloist), Wiener Sängerknaben (soprano soloist, alto soloist and choir), Concentus musicus Wien (orchestra), conducted by Nikolaus Harnoncourt. Recorded in 1967. Telefunken SAWT-9539 / Telefunken 6.41101 / Teldec 0630-12321-2
- Gächinger Kantorei Stuttgart, Württembergisches Kammerorchester Heilbronn, conducted by Helmuth Rilling. Recorded in 1984. Die Bach Kantate Vol. 66. Hänssler 98.828 / Hänssler 92.059
- Holland Boys Choir, Netherlands Bach Collegium, conducted by Pieter Jan Leusink. Recorded in 2000. Bach Edition Vol. 19. Brilliant Classics 99378
- Amsterdam Baroque Orchestra & Choir, conducted by Ton Koopman. Recorded in 2002–2003. J.S. Bach: Complete Cantatas Vol. 21. Antoine Marchand, 2006
