= Lobt ihn mit Herz und Munde, BWV 220 =

Church cantata by unknown composer

Lobt ihn mit Herz und Munde (Praise him with heart and voice), BWV 220, is a church cantata by an unknown composer, formerly attributed to Johann Sebastian Bach.

== History and text ==
The cantata was written for the Feast of the Nativity of St. John the Baptist. It derives from a chorale by Ludwig Humbold and from Isaiah 61:10.

== Scoring and structure ==
The piece is scored for alto, tenor and bass soloists, four-part choir, flauto traverso, two oboes, two violins, viola and basso continuo.

It has five movements:

1. Chorale: Lobt ihn Herz und Munde
2. Aria (tenor): So preiset den Höchsten, den König des Himmels
3. Recitative (bass): Auf Gottes Preis muss alle Freude zielen
4. Aria (alto): Sich in Gott und Jesu freuen
5. Chorus: Ich freue mich im Herrn

== Recording ==
- Alsfelder Vokalensemble / Steintor Barock Bremen, Wolfgang Helbich. The Apocryphal Bach Cantatas. CPO, 1991.
