= Gedenke, Herr, wie es uns gehet, BWV 217 =

Church cantata by Johann Christoph Altnickol

Gedenke, Herr, wie es uns gehet (Be mindful of our condition, Lord), BWV 217, (Note: "BWV" is Bach-Werke-Verzeichnis, a thematic catalogue of Bach's works.) is a church cantata, formerly attributed to Johann Sebastian Bach. It is now attributed to Johann Christoph Altnickol, Bach's son-in-law.

== History and text ==
The unknown composer wrote this piece for the First Sunday after Epiphany. The librettist is also unknown.

== Scoring and structure ==
The cantata is scored for SATB soloists and choir, flauto traverso, two violins, viola and basso continuo.

It has five movements:

1. Chorus: Gedenke, Herr, wie es uns gehet
2. Recitativ (soprano): Ach, Jesus ist verloren
3. Aria (alto): Saget mir, beliebte Felder
4. Duet recitative and arioso (tenor and bass): Sei, kummervolles Herz, getrost
5. Chorus: Ändert euch, ihr Klagelieder

== Recording ==
- Alsfelder Vokalensemble / Steintor Barock Bremen, Wolfgang Helbich. The Apocryphal Bach Cantatas. CPO, 1991.
