= Church cantata =

Type of cantata during a liturgical service

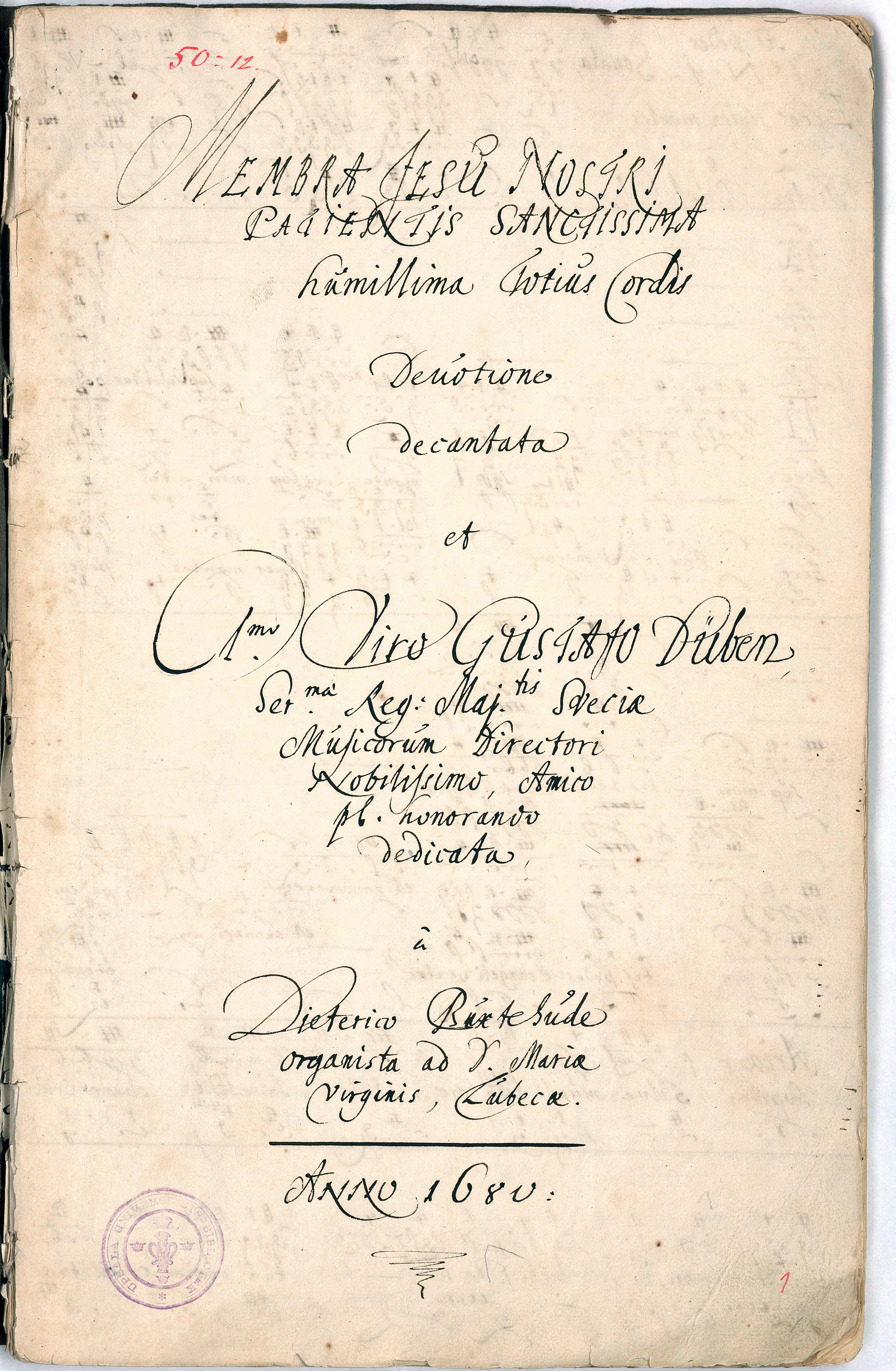
Title page of Membra Jesu Nostri, seven cantatas in medieval Latin by Dieterich Buxtehude, 1680

A church cantata or sacred cantata is a cantata intended to be performed during Christian liturgy. The genre was particularly popular in 18th-century Lutheran Germany, with many composers writing an extensive output: Stölzel, Telemann, Graupner and Krieger each wrote nearly or more than a thousand. The best known examples, however, are those of Johann Sebastian Bach, whose output stands out not by quantity but by the high level of expertise and craftmanship which they showcase.

The bulk of extant cantatas were composed for occasions occurring in the liturgical calendar of the German Reformation era, including Passion cantatas for Good Friday, and most made reference to the content of the readings and to Lutheran hymns appropriate for the occasion. The melodies of such hymns often appeared in cantatas, for example as in the four-part settings concluding Bach's works, or as a cantus firmus in larger choral movements. Other occasions for church cantatas include weddings and funeral services. The genre was later taken up by composers such as Felix Mendelssohn.

== See also ==
- List of church cantatas by liturgical occasion
