= Bach's early cantatas =

Early compositions by Johann Sebastian Bach

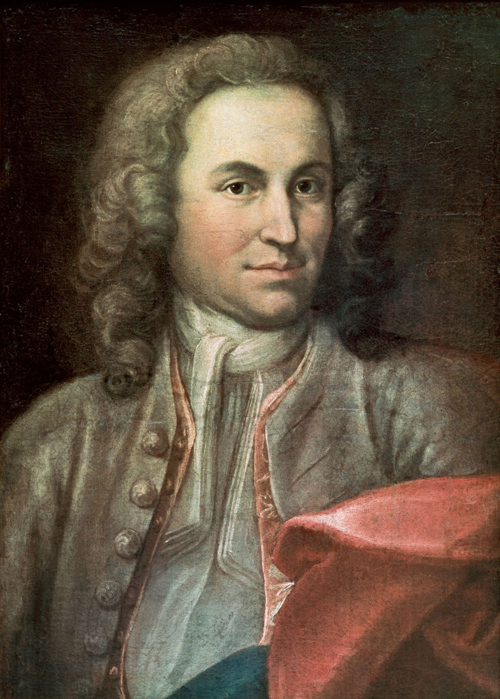
Possibly a portrait of the young Bach.

Johann Sebastian Bach started composing cantatas around 1707, when he was still an organist in Arnstadt. The first documented performances of his work took place in Mühlhausen, where he was appointed in 1708.

== Models ==
Bach's early cantatas are "Choralkonzerte" (chorale concertos) in the style of the 17th century, different from the recitative and aria cantata format associated with Neumeister that Bach started to use for church cantatas in 1714. The Altbachisches Archiv, a collection of 17th-century vocal works, mostly by members of the Bach family, initiated by Bach's father Johann Ambrosius, contained works in the older style. Bach also had some acquaintance with Johann Pachelbel's works, although there is no evidence that Bach and Pachelbel met. Bach grew up in Thuringia while Pachelbel was based in the same region, and Bach's elder brother and teacher Johann Christoph Bach studied with Pachelbel in Erfurt. There has been recent speculation that Bach wanted to pay tribute to Pachelbel after his death in 1706. Wolff points out the relation of Bach's early cantatas to works by Dieterich Buxtehude, with whom Bach had studied in Lübeck.

== Compositions ==
The texts for the early cantatas were drawn mostly from biblical passages and hymns. Features characteristic of his later cantatas, such as recitatives and arias on contemporary poetry, were not yet present, although Bach may have heard them in oratorios by Buxtehude, or even earlier. Instead, these early cantatas include 17th-century elements such as motets and chorale concertos. They often begin with an instrumental sinfonia or sonata (sonatina). The following table lists the seven extant works composed by Bach until 1708, when he moved on to the Weimar court.

Bach uses the limited types of instruments at his disposal for unusual combinations, such as two recorders and two viole da gamba in the funeral cantata Gottes Zeit ist die allerbeste Zeit, also known as Actus Tragicus. He uses instruments of the continuo group as independent parts, such as a cello in Nach dir, Herr, verlanget mich and a bassoon in Der Herr denket an uns. The cantata for the inauguration of a town council is richly scored for trumpets, woodwinds and strings.

Bach's early cantatas
Date	Occasion	BWV	Incipit	Text source
24 Apr 1707	Easter	4	Christ lag in Todesbanden	Luther
1707?	Penitence	131	Aus der Tiefen rufe ich, Herr, zu dir	Psalm 130
4 Feb 1708	Inauguration of the town council	71	Gott ist mein König	mainly Psalm 74, with added biblical quotations
3 Jun 1708? 16 sep 1708?	Funeral	106	Gottes Zeit ist die allerbeste Zeit (Actus tragicus)	compilation of seven biblical quotations, three hymns and free poetry
5 Jun 1708?	Wedding?	196	Der Herr denket an uns	Psalm 115:12–15
10 Jul 1707?	Trinity III?	150	Nach dir, Herr, verlanget mich	Psalm 25, anon.
1709–1711?	New Year's Day? Council election?	143	Lobe den Herrn, meine Seele	mainly Psalm 146, two stanzas of Jakob Ebert's hymn "Du Friedefürst, Herr Jesu Christ"

=== Christ lag in Todesbanden, BWV 4 ===
An early version of the Christ lag in Todesbanden, BWV 4, was probably first performed in Mühlhausen on Easter 24 April 1707, as a presentation piece that was part of Bach's test to become an organist at the Divi Blasii church. The composition is a per omnes versus chorale cantata based on Martin Luther's hymn "Christ lag in Todesbanden". The cantata is only known in its later Leipzig versions. The cantata shows similarities to a composition of Johann Pachelbel based on the same Easter chorale.

=== Aus der Tiefen rufe ich, Herr, zu dir, BWV 131 ===
Aus der Tiefen rufe ich, Herr, zu dir, BWV 131 is probably Bach's oldest preserved cantata. It was commissioned by Georg Christian Eilmar, pastor at St Marien (St Mary) in Mühlhausen.

=== Gott ist mein König, BWV 71 ===
Gott ist mein König, BWV 71, was first performed for Ratswechsel (change of the city council) in Mühlhausen on 4 February 1708, and was printed the same year.

A cantata for the same event a year later, which was commissioned to be printed, is however not extant. The BWV number for the missing work is BWV Anh. 192.

=== Actus Tragicus, BWV 106 ===
Gottes Zeit ist die allerbeste Zeit, BWV 106, known as Actus Tragicus, was possibly first performed 3 June 1708 for the funeral of Dorothea Eilmar or 16 September 1708 for the funeral of Adolph Strecker, mayor of Mühlhausen.

=== Der Herr denket an uns, BWV 196 ===
Der Herr denket an uns, BWV 196 is a wedding cantata, possibly first performed in Dornheim on 5 June 1708, for the wedding of Johann Lorenz Stauber and Regina Wedemann.

=== Nach dir, Herr, verlanget mich, BWV 150 ===
Nach dir, Herr, verlanget mich, BWV 150 was possibly first performed on the third Sunday after Trinity, 10 July 1707. The authenticity of the cantata has been doubted. One of Pachelbel's works appears to be referenced in the cantata.

=== Lobe den Herrn, meine Seele, BWV 143 ===
Lobe den Herrn, meine Seele, BWV 143 is a cantata for New Year (or Council election in Mühlhausen?), which would have originated between 1709 and 1711. Its authenticity has been doubted.

=== Meine Seele soll Gott loben, BWV 223 ===
Meine Seele soll Gott loben, BWV 223 is a largely lost (BWV Anh. I) cantata that has been attributed to Johann Sebastian Bach and George Frideric Handel. If written by Bach it probably originated in his Mühlhausen time.

== Reception ==
Christoph Wolff writes:

The overall degree of mastery by which these early pieces compare favourably with the best church compositions from the first decade of the eighteenth century ... proves that the young Bach did not confine himself to playing organ and clavier, but, animated by his Buxtehude visit, devoted considerable time and effort to vocal composition. The very few such early works that exist, each a masterpiece in its own right, must constitute a remnant only ... of a larger body of similar compositions.

The Bach scholar Richard D. P. Jones writes in The Creative Development of Johann Sebastian Bach:

"His remarkable flair for text illustration is evident even in the early cantatas, particularly the two finest of them, the Actus tragicus, BWV 106, and Christ lag in Todes Banden, BWV 4. We already sense a powerful mind behind the notes in the motivic unity of the early cantatas, in the use of reprise to bind their mosaic forms together ..."

== Sources ==
- Bischof, Walter F. (2015). "BWV 4 Christ lag in Todes Banden". University of Alberta. Archived from the original on 10 May 2010.
- Dürr, Alfred (2006). The Cantatas of J. S. Bach: With Their Librettos in German-English Parallel Text. Translated by Richard D. P. Jones. Oxford University Press. ISBN 978-0-19-929776-4.
- Geck, Martin (2006). Johann Sebastian Bach: Life and Work. Translated by John Hargraves. Harcourt. ISBN 978-0-15-100648-9.
- Isoyama, Tadashi (1995). "Christ lag in Todes Banden; Nach dir, Herr, verlanget mich" (PDF). Bach-Cantatas.
- Jones, Richard D. P. (2007). The Creative Development of Johann Sebastian Bach, Volume I: 1695–1717: Music to Delight the Spirit. Oxford University Press. ISBN 978-0-19-816440-1.
- Wolff, Christoph (2002). Johann Sebastian Bach: The Learned Musician. Oxford University Press. ISBN 978-0-393-32256-9.
- Zwang, Philippe; Zwang, Gérard (2005). Guide pratique des cantates de Bach (Second revised and augmented edition.) (in French). L'Harmattan. pp. 43–ff. ISBN 978-2-296-42607-8.

Church cantatas by Johann Sebastian Bach by chronology
Bach's early cantatas 1707–09	Succeeded by Weimar cantatas
