= Lost council election cantatas by Johann Sebastian Bach =

Cantatas (lost) by J. S. Bach for council elections

In Johann Sebastian Bach's time, the election or inauguration of a new town council, normally an annual event, was celebrated with a church service. A cantata written for such occasion was indicated with the term Ratswahl (council election) or Ratswechsel (council change). Bach composed such cantatas for Mühlhausen and for Leipzig. Five of these cantatas (BWV 71, 119, 120.1, 29 and 69.2) are entirely extant. One further cantata, BWV 193.2, lost part of its music, and there are another five that have only been known to exist (two for Mühlhausen), or for which only the text is extant (three for Leipzig).

Bach worked in Mühlhausen from 1707 to 1708. His first council election cantata for that town was performed and printed in 1708. Two further works for council election in Mühlhausen, BWV 1138.1 (in 1709) and 1138.2 (in 1710) are documented. These latter works are entirely lost, in contrast to the first, BWV 71, of which both Bach's autograph and the contemporary print survive. During Bach's tenure as director musices in Leipzig, from 1723 to 1750, there were 27 instances where he had to provide music for the council election occasion. For 20 of these instances no music is known to be extant: the librettos of three cantatas, BWV 1139.1 (programmed in 1725 and 1751), 1140 (programmed in 1730) and 1141 (programmed in 1740), did however survive. Picander was the author of the first two of these librettos.

== Mühlhausen ==
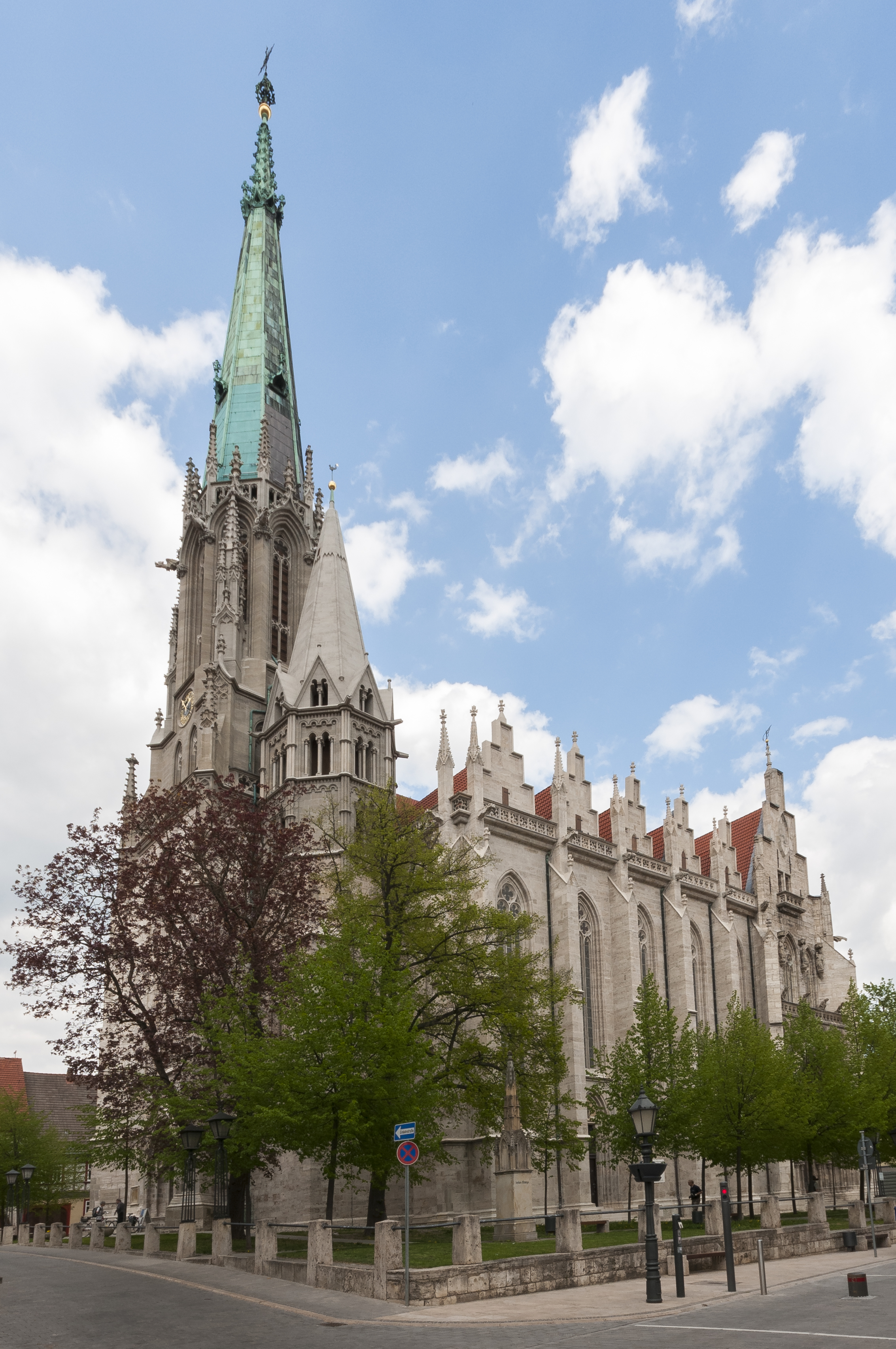
St. Mary's Church, Mühlhausen

On 1 July 1707 Johann Sebastian Bach assumed the position of organist in the Blasiuskirche (Divi Blasii), one of two major churches in Mühlhausen. In that town, the council election cantata was performed on 4 February in the other major church, the Marienkirche (St. Mary's Church), with a repeat performance of the work in the Blasiuskirche on the first Sunday after the day of the première. Customarily, the music and text of that cantata were printed on the town council's expenses.

Notwithstanding that Bach had left for a new position in Weimar in the second half of June 1708, he kept in contact with his former employers at Mühlhausen, for instance supervising the remodelling of the organ of the Blasiuskirche according to his design, which was not completed until 1709, and also writing two more council election cantatas for the town. Both text and music of these cantatas are lost, not even their title is known.

Extant

- 1708 (Saturday 4 and Sunday 5 February): Gott ist mein König, BWV 71 – Bach's first printed work.

Lost

- 1709: second council election cantata for Mühlhausen, BWV 1138.1 (formerly BWV Anh. 192)
- 1710: third council election cantata for Mühlhausen, BWV 1138.2 (formerly BWV deest)

=== Second council election cantata for Mühlhausen, BWV 1138.1 (Anh. 192) ===
Bach's lost second council election cantata for Mühlhausen, BWV 1138.1 (formerly BWV Anh. 192), was composed for 4 February 1709.

=== Third council election cantata for Mühlhausen, BWV 1138.2 ===
Bach's lost third council election cantata for Mühlhausen, BWV 1138.2, was composed for 4 February 1710.

== Leipzig ==
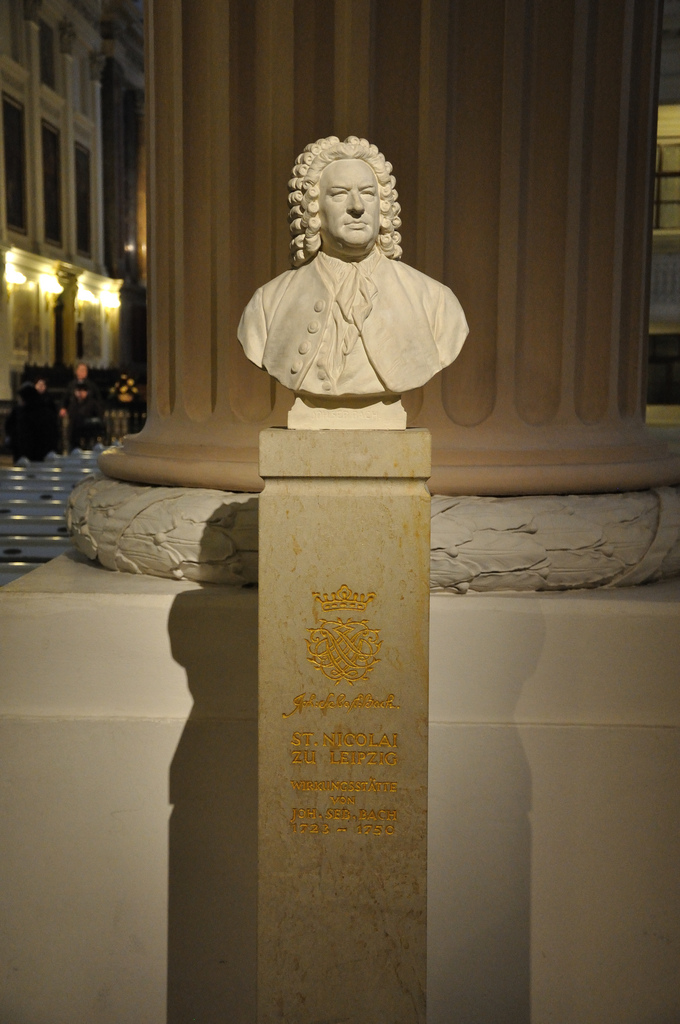
Statue of Bach at St. Nicholas Church, Leipzig

Bach was director musices of Leipzig's principal churches from late May 1723 until his death in July 1750. In that town the council election service was held at the Nikolaikirche (St Nicholas Church) on the Monday following Bartholomew (Bartholomäus), 24 August. From 1723 to 1749 that were 27 occasions where Bach had to provide the music for this service. Four entirely extant cantatas cover, as far as known, only half a dozen of these occasions (1723, 1729 or earlier, 1731, 1739, 1748 and 1749). Another, partially lost, council election cantata was performed in 1727. For the 20 other occasions no music has been known to survive, although in a few instances (1725, 1730, 1740 and 1741), at least the libretto of the council election cantata is extant.

Extant

- Preise, Jerusalem, den Herrn, BWV 119, 30 August 1723.
- Gott, man lobet dich in der Stille, BWV 120.1 (formerly BWV 120), 1729 or earlier.
- Wir danken dir, Gott, wir danken dir, BWV 29, 27 August 1731 – also performed on 31 August 1739 and 24 August 1749.
- Lobe den Herrn, meine Seele, BWV 69.2 (formerly BWV 69), 26 August 1748.
Philipp Spitta, Bach's 19th-century biographer, surmised that Lobe den Herren, den mächtigen König der Ehren, BWV 137, a chorale cantata for Trinity XII, was performed as a council election cantata on 25 August 1732. According to later research, the cantata was first performed on 19 August 1725 (as part of Bach's chorale cantata cycle), while Spitta's hypothesis of a 1732 performance as council election cantata could not be proved.

Music partially lost

- Ihr Tore zu Zion, BWV 193.2 (formerly BWV 193), 25 August 1727

Only text extant

- Wünschet Jerusalem Glück, BWV 1139.1 (formerly BWV Anh. 4), 27 August 1725 and 28 August 1741 (libretto by Picander).
- Gott, gib dein Gerichte dem Könige, BWV 1140 (formerly BWV Anh. 3), 28 August 1730 (libretto by Picander).
- Herrscher des Himmels, König der Ehren, BWV 1141 (formerly BWV Anh. 193), 28 August 1740.

=== Wünschet Jerusalem Glück, BWV 1139.1 (Anh. 4) ===
An extant contemporary print of the libretto, recovered in the first decade of the 21st century, shows that the council election cantata Wünschet Jerusalem Glück (Wish luck to Jerusalem), BWV 1139.1 (formerly BWV Anh. 4), was first performed on 27 August 1725. The recovered text has these sections, which are assumed to have been the movements of Bach's composition:

Movements of BWV 1139.1 (1725 print)
| # | Incipit | Type |
|---|---|---|
| 1 | Wünschet Jerusalem Glück | Dictum |
| 2 | Rühm' und lobe, sing' und preise | Aria |
| 3 | Gott Lob! Der Herr hat viel an uns gethan! | (Recitative) |
| 4 | Der Höchste steh uns ferner bey | Arioso |
| 5 | Herrscher aller Seraphinen | Aria |
| 6 | Herr, weihe selbst das Regiment | (Recitative) |
| 7 | Verleih uns Frieden gnädiglich | Chorale |

The opening dictum is the German version of Psalm 122:6–7:

Wünschet Jerusalem Glück; Es müsse wohl gehen denen, die dich lieben;
Es müsse Friede seyn inwendig in deinen Mauren, und Glück in deinen Pallästen.

—"Ps. CXXII, 6. 7." in Picander 1725
Translation:

Pray for the peace of Jerusalem: they shall prosper that love thee.
Peace be within thy walls, and prosperity within thy palaces.

—Psalms 122:6–7 (KJV translation)

The closing chorale is the two-stanza variant of the "Verleih uns Frieden gnädiglich" hymn: Bach's extant four-part settings of this text, BWV 42/7 and 126/6, are based on the Zahn 1945 hymn tune. Picander, the author of the BWV 1139.1 libretto, published it in 1729, however without the second recitative, and with a minor adjustment in the text of the third movement.

A variant version of the cantata, BWV 1139.2 (formerly BWV Anh. 4a) was performed on 27 June 1730, as last of three cantatas Bach performed for the 200th Anniversary of the Augsburg Confession. Likely that version of the cantata, which is also lost apart from its libretto, shared the music of only three movements with the 1725 council election cantata.

Another performance of BWV 1139.1 as council election cantata is documented for 28 August 1741. According to the libretto published in the Nützliche Nachrichten of 1741, the cantata was then performed in a six-movement version, that is, without the central arioso movement of the first version, but including the "Herr, weihe selbst das Regiment" recitative.

=== Gott, gib dein Gerichte dem Könige, BWV 1140 (Anh. 3) ===
Picander published his libretto Cantata auf die Raths-Wahl zu Leipzig, 1730 (Cantata on the council election at Leipzig, 1730) in 1732. Bach's lost setting of that libretto, Gott, gib dein Gerichte dem Könige (God, give now thy judgement unto the King), BWV 1140 (formerly BWV Anh. 3), had been performed on 28 August 1730. Picander's text has these sections:

Movements of BWV 1140 (1732 publication)
| # | Incipit | Type |
|---|---|---|
| 1 | Gott, gieb Dein Gerichte dem Könige | (Dictum) |
| 2 | Höchster, zeige Dein Gerichte | Aria |
| 3 | Herr Zebaoth, Du bist getreu | (Recitative and chorale) |
| 4 | Wir schauen Wir bauen | Aria |
| 5 | Darum verleih, Daß unser Regiment geruhig sey | (Recitative and chorale) |

The opening dictum quotes the first two verses of Psalm 72:

Gott, gieb Dein Gerichte dem Könige, und Deine Gerechtigkeit, des Königs Sohne.
Daß er Dein Volck bringe zur Gerechtigkeit, und die Elenden errette.

—Picander 1732
Translation:

Give the king thy judgments, O God, and thy righteousness unto the king's son.
He shall judge thy people with righteousness, and thy poor with judgment.

—Psalms 72:1–2 (KJV translation)

The chorale lines figuring in the third and fifth movements are:

(from third movement:)
...
Sprich Ja zu seinen Thaten.
...
Hilff selbst das Beste rathen.
...
Anfang, Fortgang, und Ende
O! Herr, zum Besten wende.

(from fifth movement:)
...
Mit Segen uns beschütte,
...
Das Hertz sey Deine Hütte.
...
Laß uns das Labsal speisen;
...
Biß wir gen Himmel reisen.

These are reworked from the last two stanzas of Paul Gerhardt's hymn "Wach auf, mein Herz, und singe":

Sprich Ja zu meinen Taten,
Hilf selbst das Beste raten;
Den Anfang, Mittl und Ende,
Ach, Herr, zum besten wende!

Mit Segen mich beschütte,
Mein Herz sei deine Hütte,
Dein Wort sei meine Speise,
Bis ich gen Himmel reise!

Translation:

Bach's extant setting of precisely these two stanzas of Gerhardt's hymn, in the last movement of his cantata Höchsterwünschtes Freudenfest, BWV 194.2, is based on Nikolaus Selnecker's hymn tune, Zahn 159, for Ludwig Helmbold's hymn "Nun laßt uns Gott dem Herren".

=== Herrscher des Himmels, König der Ehren, BWV 1141 (Anh. 193) ===
The libretto of the lost council election cantata for 28 August 1740, Herrscher des Himmels, König der Ehren, BWV 1141 (formerly BWV Anh. 193), was published in the Nützliche Nachrichten of 1740, under this header:

Den 29. Aug.
als an dem Montage nach Bartholomäi hielt Herr M. Christian Gottlob Eicher die sogennante Raths-Wahl-Predigt über die Worte Ps. CXV, 12. Der Herr gedencket an uns, und segnet uns. Nach gehaltener Predigt war folgende wohlgesetzte Cantata musicieret.

—Nützliche Nachrichten
Translation:

The 29th of August
Then, on the Monday after Bartholomew, Mr. M. Christian Gottlob Eicher gave the so-called council election sermon on the words from Psalm 115:12, "The Lord hath been mindful of us: he will bless us." After the sermon following well-set cantata was performed.

—Translation (KJV, Psalms 115:12, for Bible quote)

The libretto, the author of which is unknown, has these sections:

Movements of BWV 1141 (1740)
| # | Incipit | Type |
|---|---|---|
| 1 | Herrscher des Himmels, König der Ehren | Chorus |
| 2 | Gott, welcher selbst Regenten setzt | (Recitative) |
| 3 | Gerechte müßen wie Palmen | Aria |
| 4 | Gesegnete, beglückte Stadt | (Recitative) |
| 5 | Dancke Gott, daß er in Segen | Aria |
| 6 | So sencke doch, o Höchster, Geist und Kraft | (Recitative) |
| 7 | Es falle ietzt auf uns dein himmliches Feuer | Chorus |

The music of the closing movement may have been an adaptation of the chorus that closes the Hunting Cantata (Was mir behagt, ist nur die muntre Jagd, BWV 208), composed nearly three decades earlier.
