= Weimar cantata (Bach) =

1714-17 cantatas by Johann Sebastian Bach

Johann Sebastian Bach worked at the ducal court in Weimar from 1708 to 1717. The composition of cantatas for the Schlosskirche (court chapel) on a regular monthly basis started with his promotion to Konzertmeister in March 1714.

== Church cantatas ==
From 1714 to 1717 Bach was commissioned to compose one church cantata a month. His goal was to compose a complete set of cantatas for the liturgical year within four years. In the course of almost four years there he thus covered most occasions of the liturgical year.

The first version of Liebster Gott, vergisst du mich, BWV 1136 (formerly BWV Anh. 209), a lost cantata the libretto of which was written by Georg Christian Lehms and published in 1711 for the seventh Sunday after Trinity, may have been composed in Weimar.

=== Before 1714 ===
Apart from some Weimar cycle cantatas which may have been composed before they were adopted into that cycle (BWV 18, 21, 54 and 199):

- Lost council election cantatas for Mühlhausen:
  - 1709: second council election cantata for Mühlhausen, BWV 1138.1 (formerly BWV Anh. 192)
  - 1710: third council election cantata for Mühlhausen, BWV 1138.2 (formerly BWV deest)
- Doubtful work:
  - New Year: Lobe den Herrn, meine Seele, BWV 143 (likely 1709–1711)

=== Weimar cycle ===
The expression "Weimar cycle" has been used for the cantatas composed in Weimar from 1714 (which form the bulk of extant cantatas composed before Bach's Leipzig time).

Cantatas 54 and 199 were performed within the cycle but possibly composed earlier. BWV 18 and 21 may also have been composed before 1714.

- Annunciation (Mariae Verkündigung): Himmelskönig, sei willkommen, BWV 182 (performed on Palm Sunday 25 March 1714)
- Jubilate (third Sunday after Easter): Weinen, Klagen, Sorgen, Zagen, BWV 12 (22 April 1714)
- Pentecost: Erschallet, ihr Lieder, erklinget, ihr Saiten! BWV 172 (Weimar version in C major: 20 May 1714)
- Third Sunday after Trinity: Ich hatte viel Bekümmernis, BWV 21 (C minor, Weimar: 17 June 1714; D minor, Köthen/Hamburg: 1720)
- Oculi (Third Sunday of Lent): Widerstehe doch der Sünde, BWV 54 (4 March 1714?)
- 11th Sunday after Trinity: Mein Herze schwimmt im Blut, BWV 199 (12 August 1714: Weimar version in C minor; restaged in Köthen in a version in D minor)
- First Sunday of Advent: Nun komm, der Heiden Heiland, BWV 61 (2 December 1714)
- Christmas Christen, ätzet diesen Tag, BWV 63 (25 December 1714)
- Sunday after Christmas: Tritt auf die Glaubensbahn, BWV 152 (30 December 1714)
- Sexagesima (Second Sunday before Lent): Gleichwie der Regen und Schnee vom Himmel fällt, BWV 18 (early version in G minor, Chorton: 24 February 1715)
- Oculi (Third Sunday of Lent): Alles, was von Gott geboren, BWV 80a (24 March 1715 or 15 March 1716; music lost)
- Easter: Der Himmel lacht! Die Erde jubilieret, BWV 31 (Weimar version: 21 April 1715)
- Cantate (fourth Sunday after Easter): Leb ich, oder leb ich nicht, BWV Anh. 191 (19 May 1715 – music lost, extant libretto by Salomon Franck published Weimar 1715)
- Trinity: O heilges Geist- und Wasserbad, BWV 165 (16 June 1715)
- Fourth Sunday after Trinity: Barmherziges Herze der ewigen Liebe, BWV 185 (14 July 1715)
- 20th Sunday after Trinity: Ach! ich sehe, itzt, da ich zur Hochzeit gehe, BWV 162 (25 October 1716 or possibly 3 November 1715)
- 23rd Sunday after Trinity: Nur jedem das Seine, BWV 163 (24 November 1715)
- Fourth Sunday of Advent: Bereitet die Wege, bereitet die Bahn, BWV 132 (22 December 1715)
- Second Sunday after Epiphany: Mein Gott, wie lang, ach lange? BWV 155 (19 January 1716)
- 16th Sunday after Trinity: Komm, du süße Todesstunde, BWV 161 (6 October 1715 or 27 September 1716)
- Second Sunday of Advent: Wachet! betet! betet! wachet! BWV 70a (6 December 1716; in 1723 expanded to BWV 70 for Trinity XXVI)
- Third Sunday of Advent: Ärgre dich, o Seele, nicht, BWV 186a (13 December 1716; in 1723 expanded to BWV 186 for Trinity VII)
- Fourth Sunday of Advent: Herz und Mund und Tat und Leben, BWV 147a (20 December 1716; in 1723 expanded to BWV 147 for Visitation)

== Other sacred music and cantatas of Bach's Weimar period ==
In the Bach-Jahrbuch of 2015, Peter Wollny wrote that Bach likely encountered several of the old-school contrapuntal sacred compositions, which were going to play a seminal role in the composer's output of the 1740s, for the first time in Weimar. Among these compositions are,

- Masses by Giovanni Pierluigi da Palestrina:
  - Missa sine nomine, arranged by Bach around 1742.
  - Missa Ecce sacerdos magnus, copied under Bach's direction around 1744–1745.
- Pietro Torri's Magnificat in C major, arranged by Bach around 1742 (BWV Anh. 30).
- Kyrie–Gloria Mass for double choir, BWV Anh. 167, possibly performed under Bach's direction on 6 November 1713 in Weimar.

=== Passions ===
Passions performed in the Weimar period, however not considered to be passion cantatas, thus not generally listed in the Weimar (cantata) cycle:

- "Keiser"'s St Mark Passion, version BC D 5a (early 1710s, with possibly a few movements added or arranged by Bach)
- Weimarer Passion (26 March 1717, lost)

=== Strophic aria, BWV 1127 ===
In 1713 Bach composed a sacred aria, "Alles mit Gott und nichts ohn' ihn", for a secular occasion, the birthday of William Ernest, Duke of Saxe-Weimar.

=== Secular cantatas ===
Bach composed the first version of his secular cantata Was mir behagt, ist nur die muntre Jagd, BWV 208 (Hunting Cantata) for performance on 23 February 1713.

Church cantatas by Johann Sebastian Bach by chronology
Preceded by Bach's early cantatas	Weimar cantatas 1708–17	Succeeded by Köthen: Lobet den Herrn, alle seine Heerscharen, BWV Anh. 5
