= Gott ist mein König, BWV 71 =

1708 cantata by Johann Sebastian Bach

Gott ist mein König
- BWV 71
- Church cantata by J. S. Bach
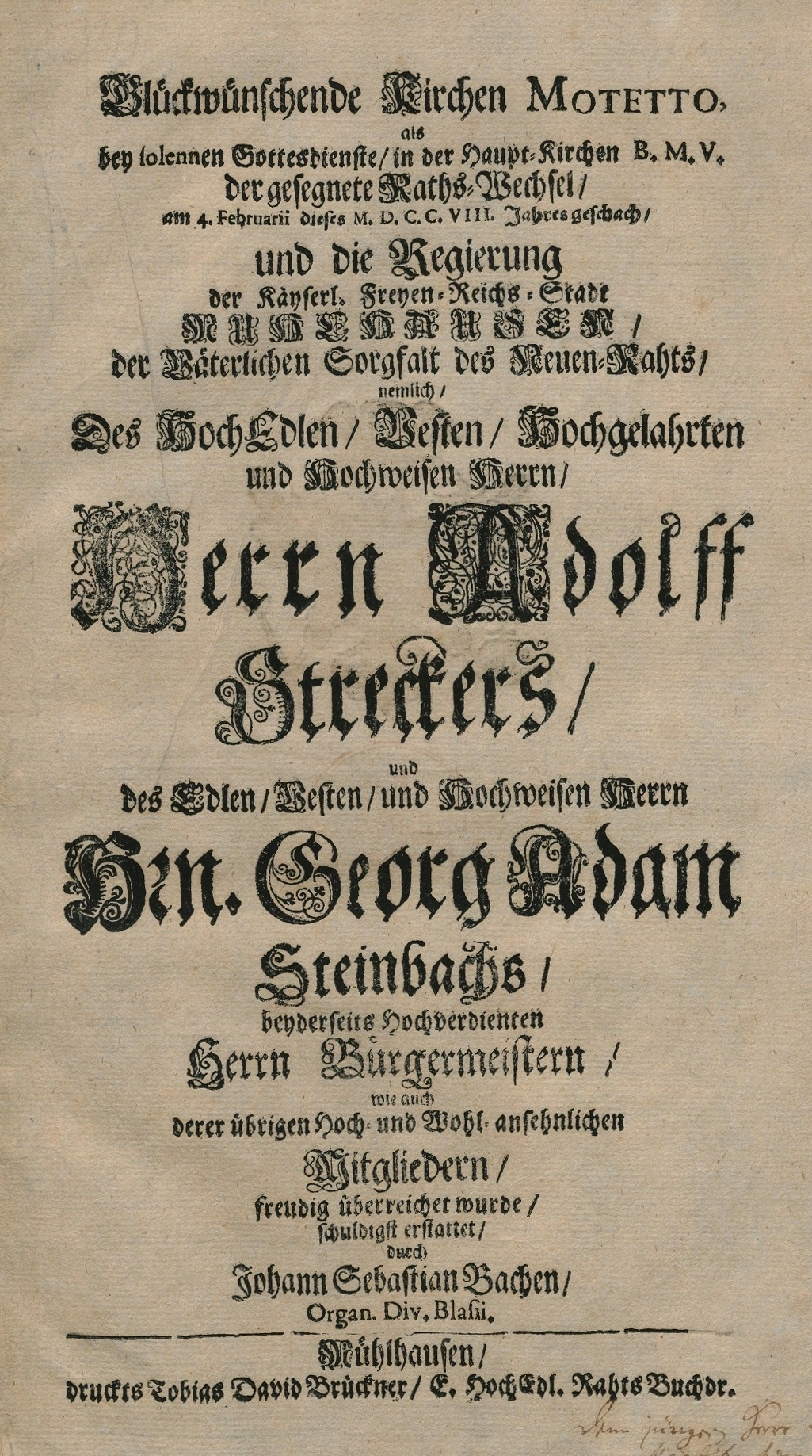
- Title page of the first edition, Bach's only cantata with an extant print
- Occasion: Ratswechsel, the inauguration of a new town council
- Bible text: Psalm 74 and several others
- Chorale: "O Gott, du frommer Gott" by Johann Heermann
- Performed: 4 February 1708: Marienkirche, Mühlhausen
- Movements: 7
- Vocal: SATB choir and solo
- Instrumental: 3 trumpets; timpani; 2 recorders; 2 oboes; bassoon; organ; 2 violins; viola; viola da gamba; continuo

Gott ist mein König (God is my King), BWV 71, (Note: "BWV" is Bach-Werke-Verzeichnis, a thematic catalogue of Bach's works.) is a cantata by Johann Sebastian Bach written in Mühlhausen when the composer was 22 years old. Unusually for an early cantata by Bach, the date of first performance is known: at the inauguration of a new town council on 4 February 1708.

The text is compiled mainly from biblical sources, three different sections from Psalm 74 and several other verses. In addition, one stanza from Johann Heermann's hymn "O Gott, du frommer Gott" is sung simultaneously with corresponding biblical text, and free poetry by an unknown poet of Bach's time which relates to the political occasion. The cantata in seven movements is scored festively with a Baroque instrumental ensemble including trumpets and timpani, "four separate instrumental 'choirs', set against a vocal consort of four singers, an optional Capelle of ripienists and an organ". Stylistically it shares features with Bach's other early cantatas.

Bach, then organist in Mühlhausen's church Divi Blasii, led the performance on 4 February 1708 in the town's main church, the Marienkirche. Although the cantata was planned to be performed only twice, it was printed the same year, the first of his works to be printed and the only cantata extant in print that was printed in Bach's lifetime.

== History and words ==
From 1707 to 1708, Bach was the organist at one of Mühlhausen's principal churches, Divi Blasii, dedicated to St Blaise, where he composed some of his earliest surviving cantatas. One or two early cantatas, for example Nach dir, Herr, verlanget mich, BWV 150, may have been written at Arnstadt, his previous residence, for a performance at Mühlhausen. He composed Gott ist mein König for a church service that was held annually to celebrate the inauguration of a new town council.

The librettist is unknown; it has been speculated that the text was written by Georg Christian Eilmar, minister of Marienkirche, who had earlier prompted the composition of Bach's cantata Aus der Tiefen rufe ich, Herr, zu dir, BWV 131. It has also been thought that Bach himself may have assembled the text, although the suggestion is unlikely since Bach's musical setting of the final part of the text departs from its bi-strophic form. There is no evidence either way to indicate the authorship of the cantata's text. Along with other early cantatas, Gott ist mein König is of a pre-Neumeister character, not featuring the combination of recitative and arias found in later cantatas.

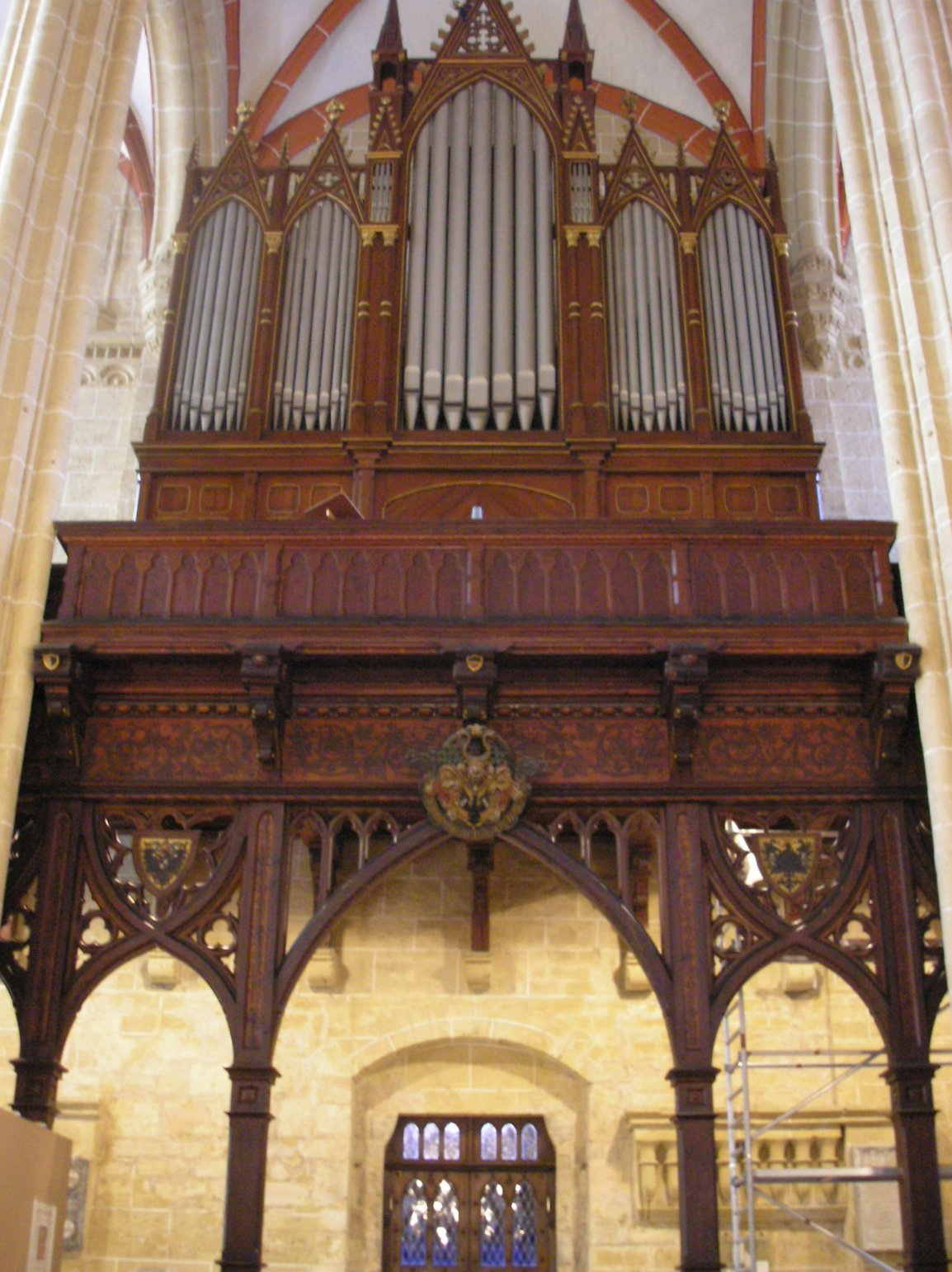
The organ in the Marienkirche, Mühlhausen

The service was held on 4 February 1708 in the Marienkirche, the town's largest church. The score indicates that Bach deployed his musicians in different locations in the building. He composed another cantata for the occasion the following year, but it is lost.

=== Theme ===
The text centres on Psalm 74, with additional material drawn from the 2 Samuel, Genesis, and Deuteronomy. Unusual for Bach's early cantatas, some contemporary unknown poet added free text that makes reference to the "new regiment" of office bearers and the Holy Roman Emperor and King of Germany, Joseph I, as Mühlhausen was an Imperial free city, thus subject immediately to the emperor.

There are three quotations from Psalm 74 (Psalms 74):

- Verse 12: "Gott ist mein König von Alters her, der alle Hülffe thut, so auf Erden geschicht." ("God is my Sovereign since ancient days, who all salvation brings which on earth may be found." – ASV version: "Yet God is my King of old, Working salvation in the midst of the earth.")
- Verses 16–17: "Tag und Nacht ist dein. Du machest, daß beyde Sonn und Gestirn ihren gewissen Lauf haben. Du setzest einem jeglichen Lande seine Gräntze." ("Day and night are Yours. You have seen to it that both sun and planets have their certain courses. You set borders to every land." – ASV: "The day is thine, the night also is thine: Thou hast prepared the light and the sun. Thou hast set all the borders of the earth.")
- Verse 19: "Du wollest dem Feinde nicht geben die Seele deiner Turteltauben." ("You would not give the soul of Your turtledove to the enemy." – ASV: "Oh deliver not the soul of thy turtle-dove unto the wild beast.")

It has been suggested that these themes include a number of distinct allusions of relevance to the inhabitants of Mühlhausen. First, the reference to Psalm 74 in general, and the inclusion of verse 19 in the cantata may be making an oblique reference, accessible to contemporary audiences, to the fire of May 1707 which had destroyed parts of the city. The importance of "borders" may be an allusion to the threat to the city's independence posed by the military campaigns of Charles XII.

Movement 2 combines three texts, two biblical verses and stanza 6 from Johann Heermann's hymn "O Gott, du frommer Gott", which all make reference to old age. An older view suggested this was likely a reference to the septuagenarian Conrad Meckbach, a member of the city council who was connected to Bach. More recent research lead to thinking that it likely refers to Adolf Strecker, the former mayor who had just left office aged 83 years, since "details of his public and private life match extremely well with the texts chosen for the cantata, and it seems likely that hearers would have recognized Strecker in them".

== Structure and scoring ==
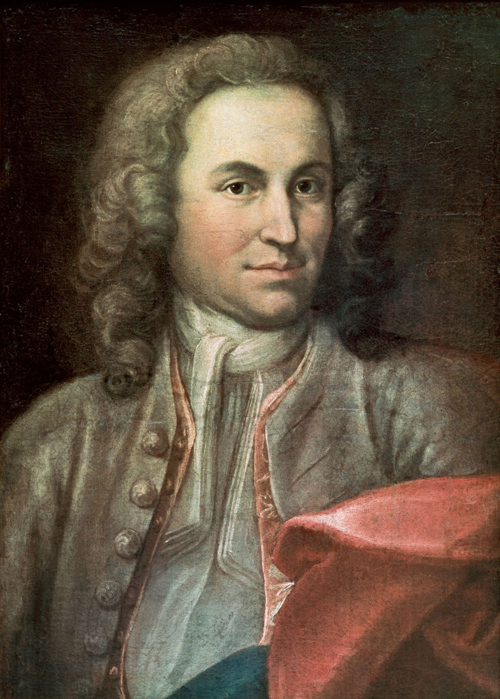
Portrait of the young Bach (disputed)

Bach structured the cantata in seven movements. He scored the vocal parts for four soloists: soprano, alto, tenor and bass. The choral writing is in four parts, and the work can be sung with just four singers, the so-called OVPP approach. Some performances deploy more singers in the choral sections. The use of a larger choir is partly a question of balance with the relatively large instrumental forces, but there is also supporting evidence for the use of more than four singers in the score, where a marking implies that Bach envisaged the option of a vocal ensemble that is separate from the four soloists. (Note: The marking in question is "ripieno", implying that there was also a "tutti" section.)

This was Bach's first cantata for festive orchestra, including trumpets and timpani. The instruments are divided into four spatially separated "choirs", placing the work in the polychoral tradition associated with composers such as Heinrich Schütz. The instruments required for the Baroque instrumental ensemble are three trumpets (Tr), timpani (Ti), two recorders (Fl), two oboes (Ob), bassoon (Fg), organ obbligato (Org), two violins (Vl), viola (Va), violoncello (Vc), viola da gamba (Vg) and basso continuo.

In the following table of the movements, the scoring follows the Neue Bach-Ausgabe. The keys are taken from Christoph Wolff, the time signatures from Alfred Dürr, using the symbol for common time (4/4). The continuo, playing throughout, is not shown.

Movements of Gott ist mein König, BWV 71
| No. | Title | Text | Type | Vocal | Winds | Strings | Key | Time |
|---|---|---|---|---|---|---|---|---|
| 1 | Gott ist mein König | Ps. 74:12 | Chorus (Tutti) | SATB | 3Tr Ti 2Fl 2Ob Fg | 2Vl Va Vc | C major | common time |
| 2 | Ich bin nun achtzig Jahr; Soll ich auf dieser Welt | Sam. II 19:37; Heermann | Aria (Air) | T S | | | E minor | common time |
| 3 | Dein Alter sei wie deine Jugend | Deut. 33:25 | Chorus (Fuga) | SATB | | Vg | A minor | common time |
| 4 | Tag und Nacht ist dein | Ps. 74:16–17 | Arioso | B | 2Fl 2Ob Fg | Vc | F major | 3/2 |
| 5 | Durch mächtige Kraft | anon. | Aria (Air) | A | 3Tr Ti | | C major | 3/8 |
| 6 | Du wollest dem Feinde nicht geben | Ps. 74:19 | Chorus | SATB | 2Fl 2Ob Fg | 2Vl Va Vc | C minor | common time |
| 7 | Das neue Regiment auf jeglichen Wegen | anon. | Chorus (Tutti) | SATB | 3Tr Ti 2Fl 2Ob Fg | 2Vl Va Vc | C major | |

== Music ==
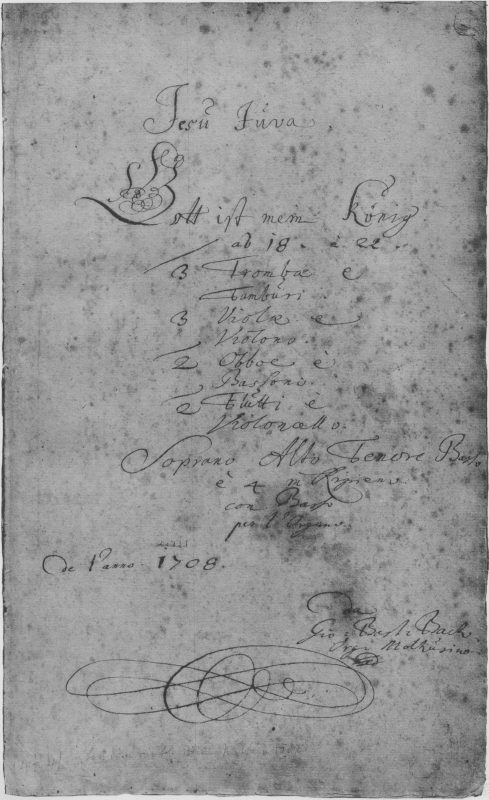
Autograph title page of the early cantata

With short movements that flow into each other, the cantata shows typical characteristics of traditional 17th-century cantatas. Unlike other early cantatas, it has no instrumental introduction. John Eliot Gardiner, who conducted the Bach Cantata Pilgrimage in 2000 and performed this cantata in the Mühlhausen church where Bach was organist, notes:

No other work of his is laid out on such a grand scale in terms of its deployment of four separate instrumental 'choirs', set against a vocal consort of four singers, an optional Capelle of ripienists and an organ.

A model for such "theatrical splendour" were oratorios by Dieterich Buxtehude, performed in Bach's presence at the Lübeck in 1705.

=== 1 ===
The opening chorus, Gott ist mein König von altersher (God is my King from long ago), is based on Psalm 74:12. It begins with a chord in C major from the instruments. The first line is repeated separating sections and as a summary at the end, accompanied always by a trumpet fanfare.

=== 2 ===
An aria for tenor, Ich bin nun achtzig Jahr, warum soll dein Knecht sich mehr beschweren? (I am now eighty years old, why shall Your servant burden himself any more?) is complemented by a hymn, sung simultaneously by the soprano, Soll ich auf dieser Welt mein Leben höher bringen (Should I upon this earth carry my life farther). All texts deal with old age. The section begins with the image of a descending continuo line. The tenor melody expresses sadness about the condition of old age. The chorale tune, sung with embellishments is not the most usual one for the hymn, possibly chosen to match the theme.

=== 3 ===
Another choral movement, Dein Alter sei wie deine Jugend, und Gott ist mit dir in allem, das du tust (May your old age be like your youth, and God is with you in everything that you do) sets more biblical passages, assuring that God is with people both old and young. It is set as a permutation fugue.

=== 4 ===
A bass arioso sets two more verses from the psalm, Tag und Nacht ist dein (Day and night are Yours). In ternary form, the outer sections are a sarabande, dealing with day and night, while the middle section describes light and sun, with a joyful motif in the continuo and word-painting in the voice.

=== 5 ===
An alto aria, Durch mächtige Kraft erhältst du unsre Grenzen (Through powerful strength You maintain our borders) is based on contemporary poetry. Set in C major with the trumpets and timpani as the only obbligato instruments, it is in two sections: the first in triple time marked Vivace corresponds to God's power and glory, while the second in common time is a prayer for peace on Earth.

=== 6 ===
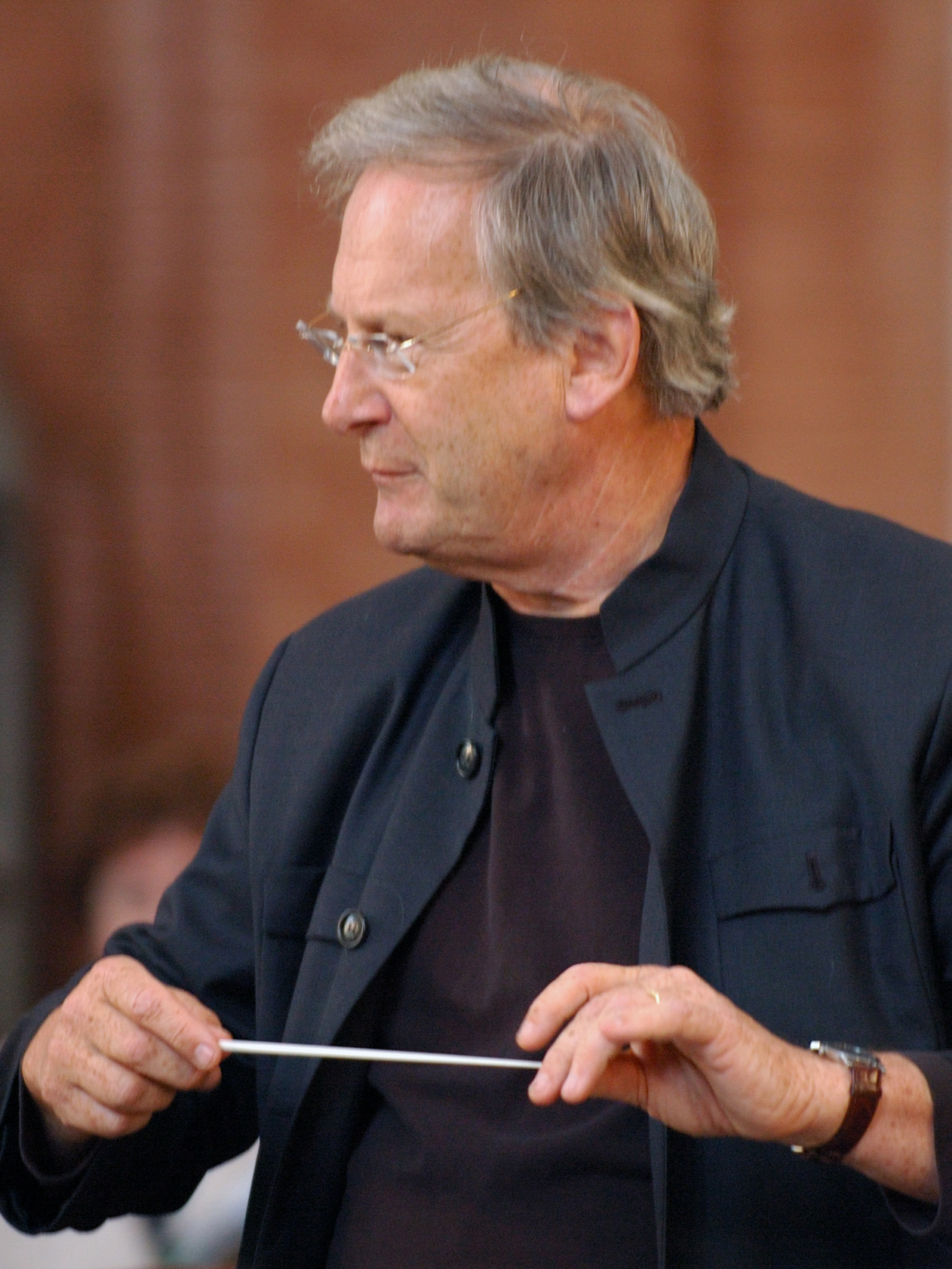
John Eliot Gardiner, who conducted the Bach Cantata Pilgrimage, in 2007

Another psalm verse is again set as a chorus, Du wollest dem Feinde nicht geben die Seele deiner Turteltauben (You would not give the soul of Your turtledove to the enemy). The voices are set in homophony on a cello in undulating motion. Gardiner notes that it is a very personal setting, "a movement of extraordinary reticence, delicacy and the utmost tonal subtlety". He notes an upward semitone as a feature to express both yearning and the sound of the turtledove. The instruments are grouped to achieve subtle colour: recorders and cello, reeds, and strings.

=== 7 ===
The last chorus Das neue Regiment (The new regime) expresses wishes for peace and well-being under the new council.

== Importance ==
Gott ist mein König is a significant early work of Bach. It differs from the other extant cantatas from Bach's time in Mühlhausen by its elaborate instrumentation. It was so positively received that it was the first of Bach's works to be printed (paid for by the city council); it is the only cantata to have been printed in his lifetime, at least in a version which has survived to this day. The printing is all the more remarkable as Gott ist mein König appears to have been intended for not more than one repeat performance, and a new piece was commissioned the following year. Bach was commissioned to compose another cantata for the following year's council inauguration; there is evidence that the piece was composed and even printed, but no copies are known to survive.

== Recordings ==
The selection is taken from the listing by Aryeh Oron on the Bach-Cantatas website. Green background indicates instrumental groups playing period instruments in historically informed performances.

Recordings of Gott ist mein König
| Title | Conductor / Choir / Orchestra | Soloists | Label | Year | Instr. |
|---|---|---|---|---|---|
| J. S. Bach: Das Kantatenwerk • Complete Cantatas • Les Cantates, Folge / Vol. 18 | Nikolaus Harnoncourt Tölzer Knabenchor Concentus Musicus Wien | soloist of the Tölzer Knabenchor; Paul Esswood; Kurt Equiluz; Lieuwe Visser | Teldec | 1977 | Period |
| J. S. Bach: Complete Cantatas Vol. 1 | Ton Koopman Amsterdam Baroque Orchestra & Choir | Barbara Schlick; Kai Wessel; Guy de Mey; Klaus Mertens | Antoine Marchand | 1994 | Period |
| J. S. Bach: Cantatas Vol. 2 – BWV 71, 106, 131 | Masaaki Suzuki Bach Collegium Japan | Midori Suzuki; Yoshikazu Mera; Gerd Türk; Peter Kooy | BIS | 1995 | Period |
| Bach Edition Vol. 20 – Cantatas Vol. 11 | Pieter Jan Leusink Holland Boys Choir Netherlands Bach Collegium | Ruth Holton; Sytse Buwalda; Knut Schoch; Bas Ramselaar | Brilliant Classics | 2000 | Period |
| Bach Cantatas Vol. 3: Tewkesbury/Mühlhausen | John Eliot Gardiner Monteverdi Choir English Baroque Soloists | Joanne Lunn; William Towers; Kobie van Rensburg; Peter Harvey | Soli Deo Gloria | 2000 | Period |

== Bibliography ==
- Geck, Martin (2006). Johann Sebastian Bach: Life and Work. Translated by John Hargraves. Harcourt. ISBN 978-0-15-100648-9.
