= Preise, Jerusalem, den Herrn, BWV 119 =

Sacred cantata by Johann Sebastian Bach 1723

Preise, Jerusalem, den Herrn
- BWV 119
- Sacred cantata by J. S. Bach
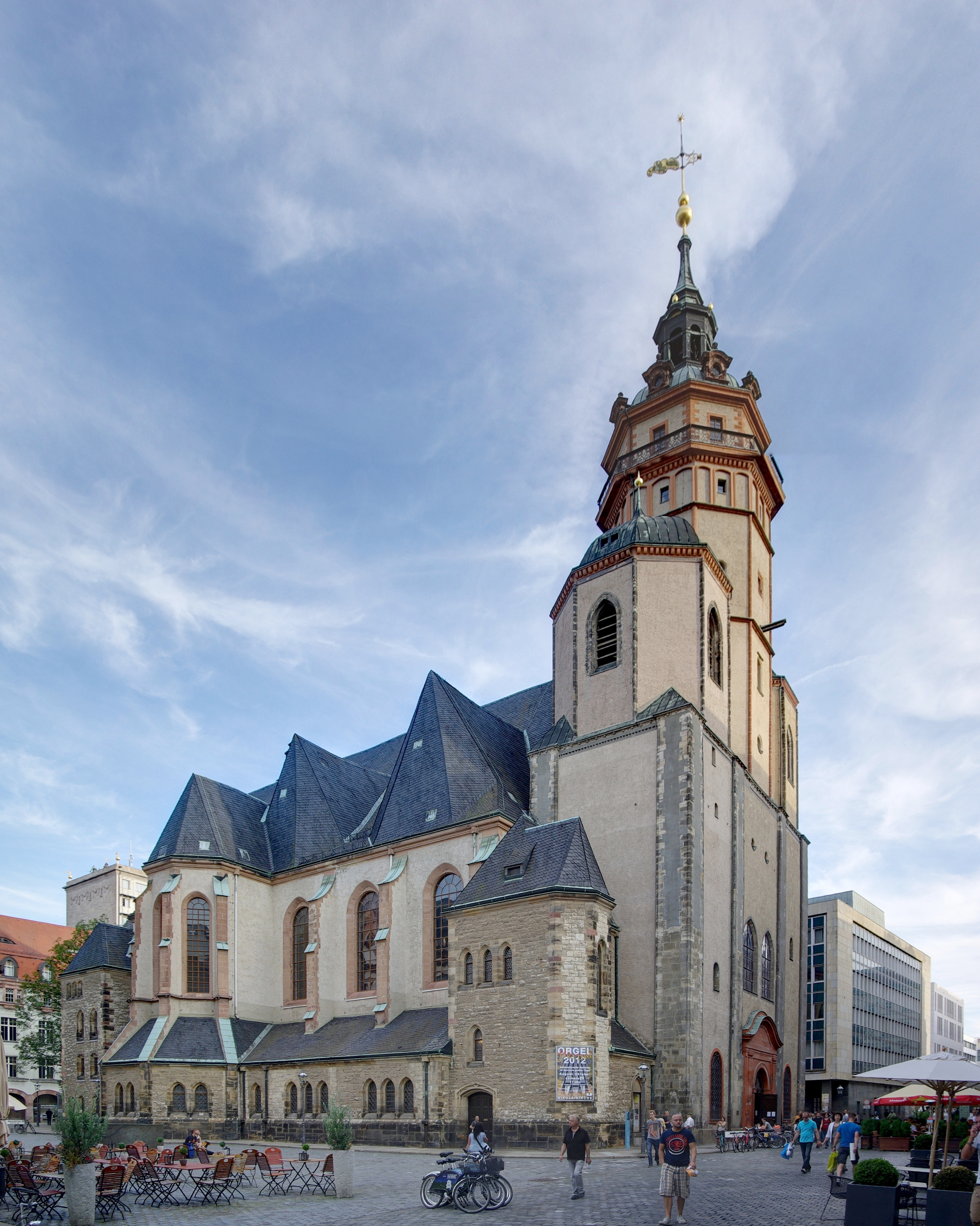
- Nikolaikirche, Leipzig
- Occasion: Ratswechsel
- Performed: 30 August 1723: Leipzig
- Movements: 9
- Vocal: SATB
- Instrumental: trumpets; timpani; recorders; oboes; strings

Preise, Jerusalem, den Herrn (Praise the Lord, Jerusalem), BWV 119, (Note: "BWV" is Bach-Werke-Verzeichnis, a thematic catalogue of Bach's works.) is a sacred cantata by Johann Sebastian Bach. He composed it in Leipzig for Ratswechsel, the inauguration of a new town council, and first performed it on 30 August 1723.

Bach composed the cantata in his first year as Thomaskantor in Leipzig, about three months after taking office at the end of May 1723. A festive service at the Nikolaikirche was an annual event, celebrating the inauguration of a new town council, always held on the Monday after St. Bartholomew (August 24). The text by an anonymous poet includes psalm verses and an excerpt from Martin Luther's German Te Deum. It is focused on acknowledgement of authority as a gift of God, thanks for past blessings, and prayer for future help.

The cantata is structured in nine movements, three of them choral (1, 7, 9), the others alternating arias and recitatives. The orchestra is large and representative, with four trumpets, timpani, two recorders and three oboes, in addition to strings and basso continuo. Bach led the Thomanerchor in the first performance.

In 2015 the cantata was performed by the Thomanerchor at the place of its premiere on 12 June, opening the Bachfest and celebrating both the 1000th anniversary of the first recorded mention of Leipzig and the 850th anniversary of the Nikolaikirche.

== History and words ==
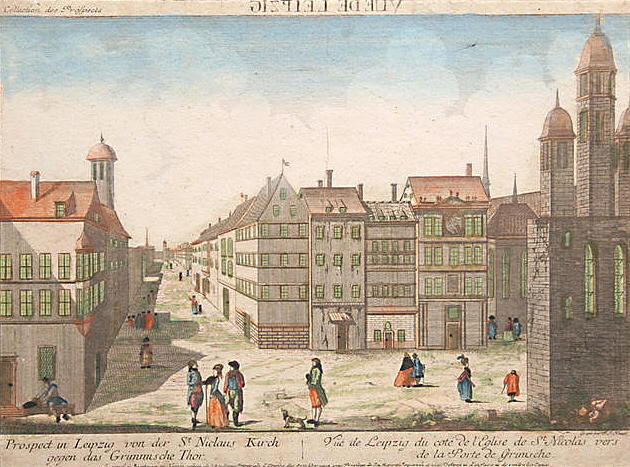
Nikolaikirche and market in the 18th century

As Thomaskantor, Bach served as music director of Leipzig and had to compose not only for music in the four major churches but also for public municipal functions. The Ratswechsel was celebrated with an annual church service at the Nikolaikirche on the Monday after St. Bartholomew, August 24. It was not a democratic election, but a "ceremonial transfer of office" of council members who were appointed. The service was not part of the liturgical year with cantata texts related to prescribed biblical epistle and gospel readings. For the Ratswechsel service, Bach could count on the entire council (his employer) listening, and probably also civil servants and representatives of the Elector's administration for the region. The musicologist Klaus Hofmann notes: "It was an opportunity for Bach to show how sacred music was flourishing under his direction and to present himself as a composer."

The cantata was Bach's first for the occasion in Leipzig. Early in his career he had written at least one cantata for the equivalent service at Mühlhausen. There are five surviving cantatas for the Ratswechsel at Leipzig, and librettos of three more, BWV Anh. I 3, 4 and 193. The other four extant cantatas are Ihr Tore zu Zion, BWV 193, composed for the occasion in 1727 but partly lost, Wir danken dir, Gott, wir danken dir, BWV 29, composed for the occasion in 1731, Gott, man lobet dich in der Stille, BWV 120, adapted from earlier cantatas for wedding and homage probably in 1742, and Lobe den Herrn, meine Seele, BWV 69, adapted from Lobe den Herrn, meine Seele, BWV 69a, for the occasion in 1748.

The text was written by an unknown librettist who included psalm verses (from Psalms 147, 85 and 126) and lines from Martin Luther's German Te Deum "Herr Gott, dich loben wir". To suit the event for which it was written, these are all turned into hymns of thanking and praising God for Leipzig's prosperity and asking him to protect the city in the future.

Bach led the Thomanerchor in the performance on 30 August 1723.

== Scoring and structure ==
Bach structured the cantata in nine movements with choral movements as a frame and in movement 7, otherwise alternating recitatives and arias. He scored it for four vocal soloists (soprano (S), alto (A), tenor (T) and bass (B)), a four-part choir, and an orchestra of four trumpets (Tr), timpani (Ti), two recorders (Fl), three oboes (Ob), two of them also playing oboes da caccia (Oc), two violins (Vl), viola (Va), and basso continuo (Bc).

In the following table of the movements, the scoring follows the Neue Bach-Ausgabe. The keys and time signatures are taken from the Bach scholar Alfred Dürr, using the symbol for common time (4/4). The instruments are shown separately for winds and strings, while the continuo, playing throughout, is not shown.

Movements of Preise, Jerusalem, den Herrn
No.	Title	Text	Type	Vocal	Winds	Strings	Key	Time
1	Preise, Jerusalem, den Herrn	Psalm 147,12–14	Chorus	SATB	4Tr Ti 2Fl 3Ob	2Vl Va	C major	12/8
2	Gesegnet Land, glückselge Stadt		Recitative	T				common time
3	Wohl dir, du Volk der Linden		Aria	T	2Oc		G major	common time
4	So herrlich stehst du, liebe Stadt		Recitative	B	4Tr Ti 2Fl 2Oc			common time
5	Die Obrigkeit ist Gottes Gabe		Aria	A	2Fl (unis.)		G minor	6/8
6	Nun! wir erkennen es und bringen dir		Recitative	S				common time
7	Der Herr hat Guts an uns getan		Chorus	SATB	4Tr Ti 2Fl 3Ob	2Vl Va	C major	common time
8	Zuletzt! Da du uns, Herr, zu deinem Volk gesetzt		Recitative	A				common time
9	Hilf deinem Volk, Herr Jesu Christ	Luther	Chorale	SATB	unknown	2Vl Va		common time

== Music ==
Even among other festive music written by Bach, this work's scoring for four trumpets is unusual. It is characterised by a very solemn character and the attributes of courtly homage music, such as the opening chorus in the form of a French overture or fanfare-like trumpet interjections in the bass recitative. Bach created a work that in musical terms corresponds less to sacred music and more to the type of secular music for a princely court, as had been required of him during his time in office in Köthen. Only in its final two movements does Bach again use simple forms to emphasize the work's character of a church cantata, implying that earthly powers do not last, but God – the supreme ruler – is entitled to have the last word.

=== 1 ===
The cantata opens with a French overture, unusual in featuring the chorus in the faster middle section. At the time of Louis XIV an overture in this style was played when the king and his entourage entered a performance. Bach's music expresses a similar respect for the authority of the town councils. The mostly homophonic slow opening is in the typical dotted rhythms, and shows a remarkable concerto of the trumpets versus the rest of the orchestra. The chorus appears only in the middle section, proclaiming verses from Psalm 147, "Preise, Jerusalem, den Herrn" (Praise the Lord, Jerusalem). It uses both fugal techniques and paired entries. The coda is a recapitulation of the first section. Analysis of corrections show that Bach probably used an instrumental piece composed earlier, and that the characteristic upward run on the first word "Preise" was added later. The text from psalm 147,12–14a addresses Jerusalem, but the Leipzig congregation understood it as their city.

=== 2 ===
A secco recitative introduces the topic, "Gesegnet Land, glückselge Stadt" (Blessed land, fortunate city): a town is blessed if God reigns in it.

=== 3 ===
The oboes da caccia present a dotted-rhythm ritornello to introduce the tenor aria. The vocal entry is before the ritornello cadence, "Wohl dir, du Volk der Linden" (Good fortune, you people of the lindens), a reference to Leipzig sometimes being called Lindenstadt.

=== 4 ===
The bass recitative, "So herrlich stehst du, liebe Stadt!" (So gloriously you stand, dear city!), is introduced and concluded with a fanfare-like trumpet and timpani line, further wind instruments, recorders and oboes da caccia add colour to the middle section, in an unusual movement for the Leipzig congregation.

=== 5 ===
The alto aria, "Die Obrigkeit ist Gottes Gabe" (Authority is God's gift), is accompanied by two obbligato recorders in unison. It is the only minor-mode movement of the cantata. The obbligato presents high repeated notes beginning midway through the ritornello theme, which recurs as episodes and at the conclusion of the movement. The movement is, in effect, a trio sonata.

=== 6 ===
A soprano recitative, "Nun! Wir ekennen es und bringen dir" (Now! we acknowledge it and bring to You), expresses thanks for God's gift and acknowledgement of the burden on the people serving as town council, those who did it the last year and those who succeed.

=== 7 ===
A choral movement confirms "Der Herr hat Guts an uns getan" (The Lord has done good things for us). The movement is structured like a da capo aria, with a fugue in the opening and repeat, while the contrasting middle section is mostly homophonic. A long ritornello theme features an "imperious" trumpet melody, which is played four times during the movement. The voices then enter from the lowest to the highest, with the fugal section based on the first phrase of Nun danket alle Gott. Additional instruments then lead to a climax. In the middle section motifs from the ritornello are played "above and between" the voices. One fanfare motif appears also in Bach's first Brandenburg Concerto and would later be used in the bass aria Großer Herr und starker König in the Christmas Oratorio. The Bach scholar Klaus Hofmann assumes, reflecting its secular character as a hunting signal and fanfare, that the movement is derived from an earlier homage cantata.

=== 8 ===
A very short alto recitative, "Zuletzt! Da du uns, Herr, zu deinem Volk gesetzt" (Finally! Since You have established us as Your people), is harmonically "adventurous".

=== 9 ===
The cantata ends with the ninth stanza from Luther's German Te Deum, "Hilf deinem Volk, Herr Jesu Christ" (Help Your people, Lord Jesus Christ), a prayer for further help and preservation. It is a four-part setting "with the subtlest touches of flamboyance" in a chorale. No individual parts for the cantata have survived; and the score provides only the four-part setting without mentioning which instruments would play with which voice. Hofmann imagines that there might have been additional parts for trumpets and timpani for an ending to match the opening of the cantata.

== Recordings ==
The entries in the table are taken from the selection on the Bach Cantatas Website. Ensembles playing period instruments are marked by green background.

Recordings of Preise, Jerusalem, den Herrn
Title	Conductor / Choir / Orchestra	Soloists	Label	Year	Orch. type
Bach Made in Germany Vol. 1 - Cantatas IX	Günther Ramin Thomanerchor Gewandhausorchester	Soloist of the Thomanerchor; Marianne Biederbeck-Schuster; Gert Lutze; Johannes Oettel	Eterna	1953	
J. S. Bach: Cantatas BWV 119 & BWV 129	Diethard Hellmann Bach-Chor (Kurrende of the Christuskirche) Bach-Orchester Mainz	Ursula Buckel; Margrit Conrad; Helmut Krebs; Carl-Heinz Müller	Da Camera	1967	
Die Bach Kantate Vol. 66	Helmuth Rilling Gächinger Kantorei Bach-Collegium Stuttgart	Arleen Augér; Ann Murray; Adalbert Kraus; Wolfgang Schöne	Hänssler	1978	
J. S. Bach: Complete Cantatas Vol. 10	Ton Koopman Amsterdam Baroque Orchestra & Choir	Caroline Stam; Michael Chance; Paul Agnew; Klaus Mertens	Antoine Marchand	1998	Period
J. S. Bach: "Wir danken dir, Gott"	Philippe Herreweghe Collegium Vocale Gent	Deborah York; Ingeborg Danz; Mark Padmore; Peter Kooy	Harmonia Mundi France	1999	Period
J. S. Bach: Cantatas Vol. 16	Masaaki Suzuki Bach Collegium Japan	Yoshie Hida; Kirsten Sollek-Avella; Makoto Sakurada; Peter Kooy	BIS	1999	Period
Bach Edition Vol. 19 – Cantatas Vol. 10	Pieter Jan Leusink Holland Boys Choir Netherlands Bach Collegium	Ruth Holton; Sytse Buwalda; Marcel Beekman; Bas Ramselaar	Brilliant Classics	2000	Period

== 2015 performance ==
The cantata was performed in the opening concert of the Bachfest Leipzig on 12 June 2015, celebrating 1000 years since the first recorded mention of Leipzig and the 850th anniversary of the Nikolaikirche. A line from the libretto was the festival's motto for the occasion: "So herrlich stehst du, liebe Stadt!" (So gloriously you stand, dear city!). The cantata was performed at the Nikolaikirche by Ute Selbig, Britta Schwarz, Patrick Grahl, Jochen Kupfer, the Thomanerchor and the Händelfestspielorchester Halle, conducted by Gotthold Schwarz.

== Sources ==
- Preise, Jerusalem, den Herrn, BWV 119: Scores at the International Music Score Library Project
- Cantata BWV 119 - Preise, Jerusalem, den Herrn (Johann Sebastian Bach) ChoralWiki
- Preise, Jerusalem, den Herrn (in German) history, scoring, Bach website
- BWV 119 Preise, Jerusalem, den Herrn English translation, University of Vermont
