= Nach dir, Herr, verlanget mich, BWV 150 =

Church cantata by Johann Sebastian Bach

Nach dir, Herr, verlanget mich
- BWV 150
- Church cantata by J. S. Bach
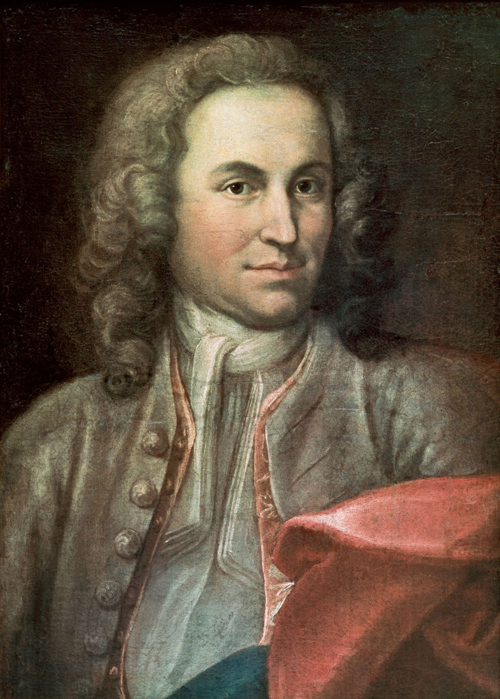
- Portrait of the young Bach (disputed)
- Bible text: Psalms 25:1–2, 5, 15
- Performed: Possibly 1707 (Note: There is a consensus that this is one of the earliest Bach cantatas, possibly the earliest extant.)
- Movements: 7
- Vocal: SATB choir and solo
- Instrumental: 2 violins; bassoon; continuo

Nach dir, Herr, verlanget mich (For Thee, O Lord, I long), BWV 150, (Note: "BWV" is Bach-Werke-Verzeichnis, a thematic catalogue of Bach's works.) is an early church cantata by Johann Sebastian Bach composed for an unknown occasion. It is unique among Bach's cantatas in its sparse orchestration and in the independence and prominence of the chorus, which is featured in four out of seven movements. The text alternates verses from Psalm 25 and poetry by an unknown librettist. Bach scored the work for four vocal parts and a small Baroque instrumental ensemble of two violins, bassoon and basso continuo.

Many scholars think that it may be the earliest extant cantata by Bach, possibly composed in Arnstadt in 1707.

== History and text ==
Bach's original score is lost. The music survives in a copy made by C F Penzel, one of Bach's last pupils, after the composer's death. The date of composition is not known, and sources differ as to when and where Bach composed the work. However, the balance of opinion has moved towards a date at the beginning of Bach's career. It is not currently in dispute that it is one of Bach's earliest surviving cantatas. Suggestions for the place of composition have been:

- Weimar, where Bach worked from 1708. The conductor and academic Jonathan Green dates the work c. 1708–1710; the Bach scholar William G. Whittaker dates it c. 1712.
- Mühlhausen, where Bach worked in 1707/1708. The Zwang catalogue (which attempts to list the cantatas chronologically) dated it as the sixth of the surviving cantatas by Bach, and placed Aus der Tiefen rufe ich, Herr, zu dir, BWV 131, as the earliest. Aus der Tiefen rufe ich, Herr, zu dir is known to have been composed in Mühlhausen in 1707/1708.
- Arnstadt, where Bach worked until his move to Mühlhausen in the summer of 1707. Late 20th-century scholarship suggests Nach dir, Herr, verlanget mich could have been composed at Arnstadt.

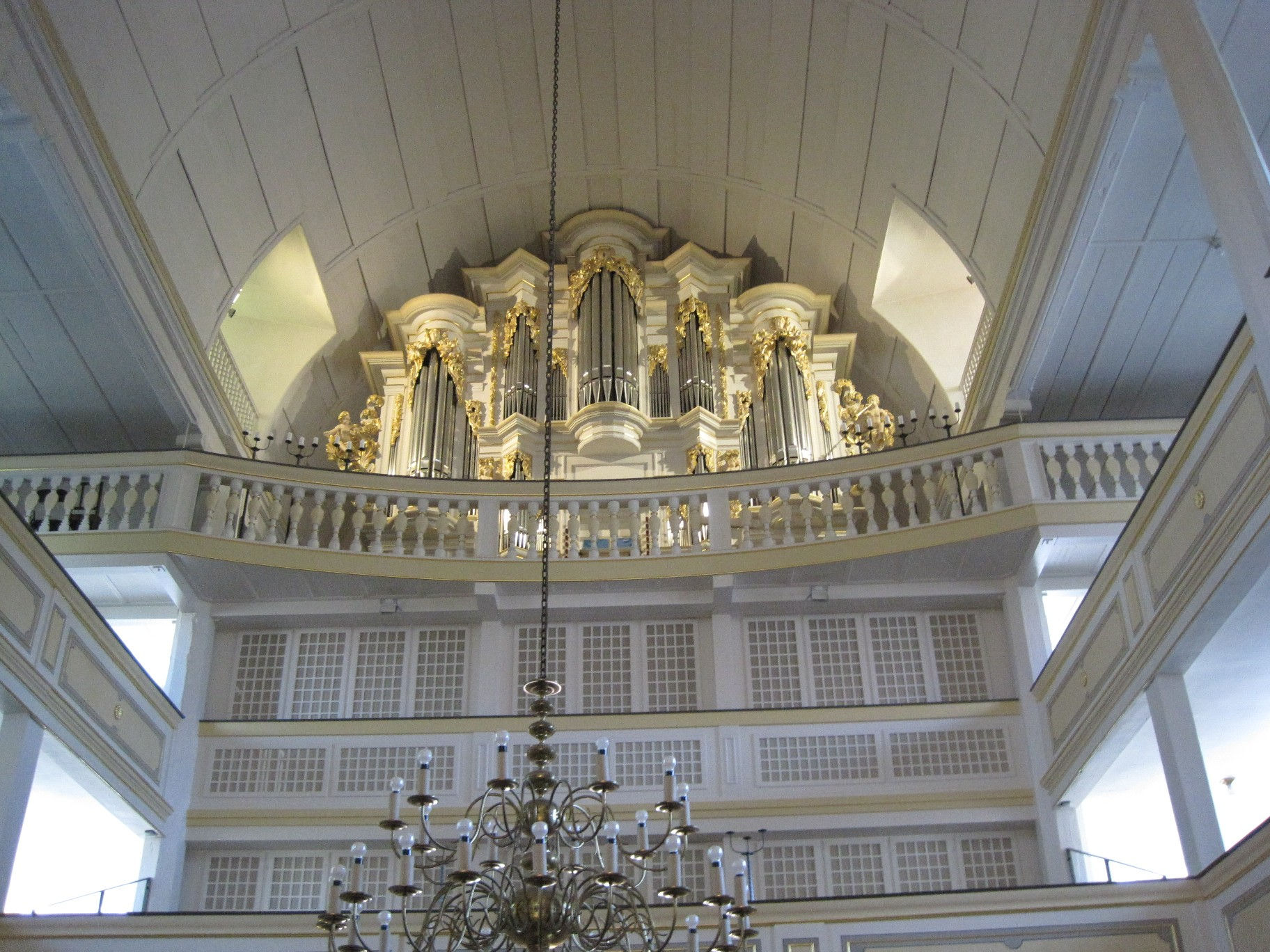
The Wender organ, which Bach inspected, in the Neue Kirche, Arnstadt, for which the cantata was probably composed

The Bach scholar Andreas Glöckner argued in 1988 that the cantata may have been composed in Arnstadt.

In 2010, the scholar Hans-Joachim Schulze identified a remarkable acrostic in movements 3, 5 and 7 (which he described in the 2010 Bach-Jahrbuch, the journal of the Neue Bachgesellschaft). Adjusting for transposition errors by the copyist, the initial letters should spell DOKTOR CONRAD MECKBACH and plausibly therefore the work was composed to mark this Mühlhausen councillor's 70th birthday in April 1707. On this basis the cantata may date from Bach's time in Arnstadt. Possibly the cantata was heard a few weeks later after the end of Lent, and thus it may have formed a test-piece for the Mühlhausen appointment, composed in Arnstadt with Bach's supporter Meckbach in mind.

The cantata is, as John Eliot Gardiner notes, "generally accepted to be Bach's very first church cantata." In 2000, Gardiner conducted the Bach Cantata Pilgrimage and performed the cantata in the church for which it was then probably composed, at Bach's time called Neue Kirche (new church), now the Johann-Sebastian-Bach-Kirche.

The libretto alternates between biblical verses and free contemporary poetry, which is common in Bach's later cantatas, but rare among his early cantatas. The text of movements 2, 4, and 6 are selected psalm verses, Psalms 25:1–2, 5, 15. The author of the poetry is unknown. On the basis of the text, it has been suggested that the work was written for a penitential service.

The cantata was first published in 1884 in the Bach-Gesellschaft-Ausgabe, the first edition of Bach's complete works. The composer Johannes Brahms, who served on the editorial board of the Bach-Gesellschaft-Ausgabe, took an interest in the cantata as it was being published. He used an adapted version of the bass line of the closing chaconne for a work he completed in 1885, his Symphony No. 4.

== Structure and scoring ==
Bach structured the cantata in seven movements, an opening instrumental sinfonia and four choral movements interspersed by only two arias. He scored it for four soloists (soprano, alto, tenor and bass), a four-part choir, and a small Baroque instrumental ensemble of two violins (Vl), bassoon (obbligato) (Fg) and basso continuo. The duration of the cantata is about 17 minutes.

In the following table of the movements, the scoring follows the Neue Bach-Ausgabe. The keys and time signatures are taken from Alfred Dürr, using the symbol for common time (4/4). The continuo, playing throughout, is not shown.

Movements of Nach dir, Herr, verlanget mich, BWV 150
No.	Title	Text	Type	Vocal	Bassoon	Strings	Key	Time
1	(Sinfonia)		Sinfonia		Fg	2Vl	B minor	common time
2	Nach dir, Herr, verlanget mich	Psalm 25:1–2	Chorus	SATB	Fg	2Vl	B minor	common time
3	Doch bin und bleibe ich vergnügt	anon.	Aria	S		2Vl	B minor	common time
4	Leite mich in deiner Wahrheit	Psalm 25:5	Chorus	SATB	Fg	2Vl	B minor -> B major	
5	Zedern müssen von den Winden	anon.	Aria	A T B	Fg		D major	3/4
6	Meine Augen sehen stets zu dem Herrn	Psalm 25:15	Chorus	SATB	Fg	2Vl	D major	6/8
7	Meine Tage in dem Leide	anon.	Chorus	SATB	Fg	2Vl	B minor	3/2

== Music ==
The work begins with a sinfonia and then alternates choral movements and arias. There are no recitatives, no da capo repeats, and there is no chorale tune, unusually for Bach's cantatas. Bach makes extensive use of choral fugues and imitative polyphony, often shifting the tempo and character of the music within movements very quickly to accommodate a new musical idea with each successive phrase of text.

The sinfonia and the opening choral movement are both based on the motive of an octave leap followed by five descending half steps. This chromatic figure, sometimes dubbed the "lamento bass" or passus duriusculus, has been utilized by composers as early as Monteverdi as a musical representation of anguish, pain, and longing. The sinfonia also introduces thematic material developed later in the work, uses asymmetric phrasing, and "a seamless flow of unstoppable melody".

The first chorus on the beginning of Psalm 25, "Nach dir, Herr, verlanget mich. Mein Gott, ich hoffe auf dich." (Lord, I long for you. My God, I hope in you.), is "waywardly constructed despite its relative brevity". It is episodic, emphasizing a descending chromatic scale motif. The musicologist Tadashi Isoyama notes "the graphically chromatic phrases of the opening sinfonia and the following chorus; these are evocative of the suffering of the world".

The following soprano aria, "Doch bin und bleibe ich vergnügt" (Yet I am and remain content), is also brief but includes significant word painting.

The fourth movement, "Leite mich in deiner Wahrheit und lehre mich" (Lead me in your Truth and teach me), is another short and episodic chorus, divided into four sections.

Movement five, "Zedern müssen von den Winden oft viel Ungemach empfinden" (Cedars must, before the winds, often feel much hardship), is one of only a handful of vocal trios to be found in Bach's oeuvre, as well as the only movement in the cantata in all major. Isoyama writes: "the continuo part drives the music forward with its phrase describing the trials of the stormwinds".

The penultimate movement, "Meine Augen sehen stets zu dem Herrn", features a "celestial haze" of instruments as part of a complex texture. It is in binary form and modulates from D major through B minor to B major.

The final movement, "Meine Tage In Dem Leide", is a chaconne, a form which is typically constructed over a repeated ground bass. Bach uses a ground bass which is possibly a borrowing from Pachelbel. It is the inversion of the chromatic fourth ostinato from the opening movement. Bach's orchestration includes strumming effects which could be seen as recalling the origin of the chaconne in Spanish guitar music. From a theological point of view, both the inversion of the lamento bass and the series of modulations in this movement express in baroque musical affect how Christ leads from sorrow to joy.

== Selected recordings ==
- Heinrich-Schütz-Chor Heilbronn, Württembergisches Kammerorchester Heilbronn, dir. Fritz Werner. Les Grandes Cantates de J.S. Bach Vol. 28. Erato, 1973.
- Knabenchor Hannover, Collegium Vocale Gent, Leonhardt-Consort, dir. Gustav Leonhardt. J.S. Bach: Das Kantatenwerk – Complete Cantatas Vol. 36. Teldec, 1985
- Amsterdam Baroque Orchestra & Choir, dir. Ton Koopman. J.S. Bach: Complete Cantatas Vol. 1. Antoine Marchand, 1994.
- Bach Collegium Japan, dir. Masaaki Suzuki. Bach Cantatas Vol. 1. BIS, 1995.
- Monteverdi Choir, English Baroque Soloists, dir. John Eliot Gardiner. Bach Cantatas. Soli Deo Gloria, 2000.
- Voces8, dir. Barnaby Smith. After Silence III. Redemption. Voces8, 2020.

== Sources ==
- Green, Jonathan (2000). A Conductor's Guide to the Choral-Orchestral Works of J. S. Bach. Scarecrow Press.
- Jeffers, Ron (2000). Translations and Annotations of Choral Repertoire, Volume 2: German Texts. Earthsongs.
- Whittaker, William Gillies (1959). The Cantatas of Johann Sebastian Bach. Vol. 1. Oxford University Press.
- Young, W. Murray (1989). The Cantatas of J. S. Bach: An Analytical Guide. McFarland & Co.
- Zwang, Philippe; Zwang, Gérard (2005). Guide pratique des cantates de Bach (Second revised and augmented edition.) (in French). L'Harmattan. pp. 52–53. ISBN 9782296426078.
