= St. Mary's Church, Mühlhausen =

Coordinates: 51°12′37″N 10°27′18″E

St. Mary's Church
- German: Marienkirche
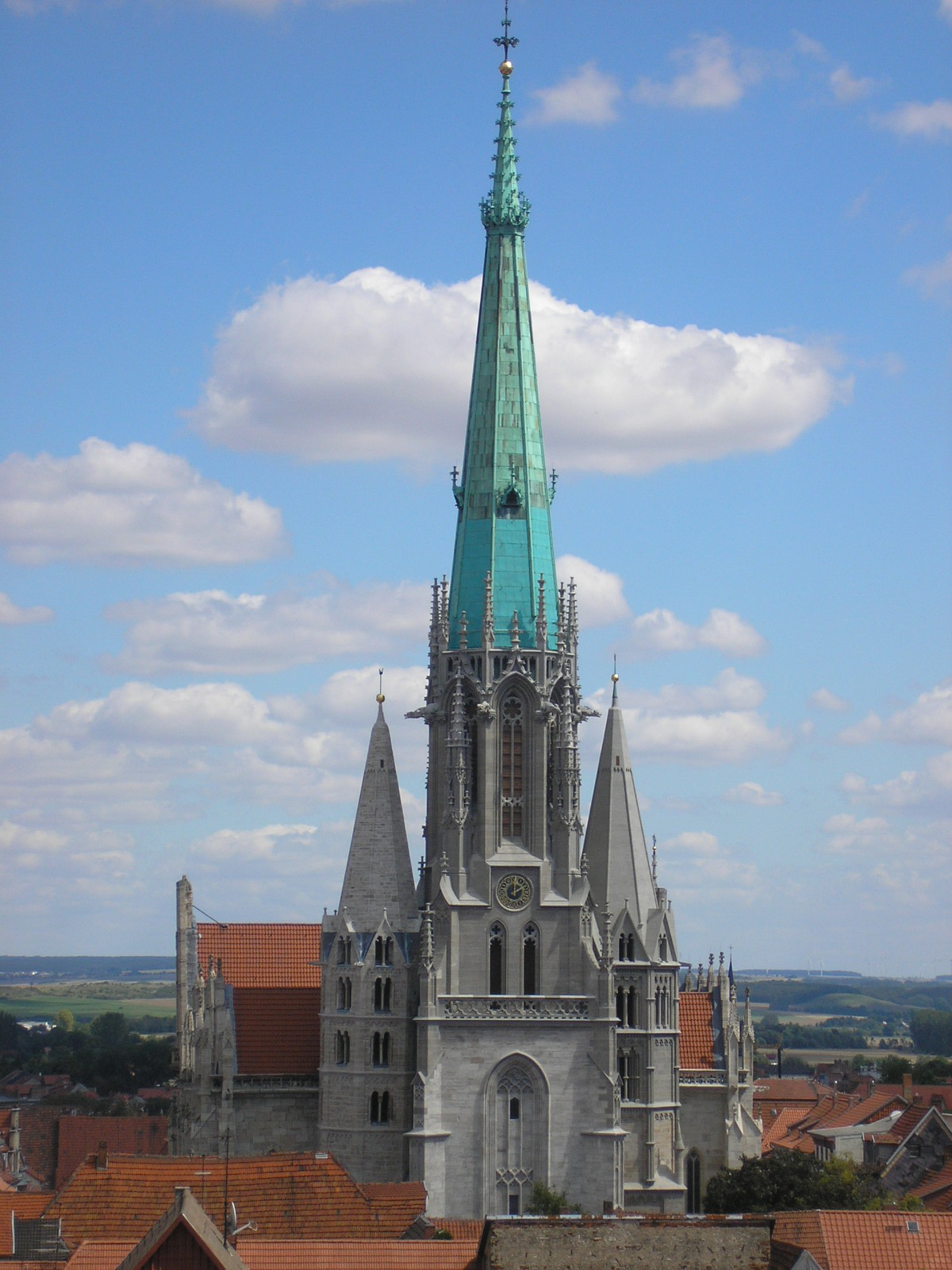
- St. Mary's Church seen from the Raven's Tower, facing east

- Location within Thuringia Location within Germany
- Location: Mühlhausen, Thuringia
- Country: Germany
- Denomination: Lutheran
- Previous denomination: Roman Catholic

History
- Status: Church
- Founded: Middle Ages
- Dedication: Mary, mother of Jesus

Architecture
- Functional status: Museum (since 1975)
- Architectural type: Hall church
- Style: Gothic, Gothic Revival
- Years built: 13th to 15th century 1898–1903 (central spire)

Specifications
- Materials: Travertine

St. Mary's Church (German: Marienkirche) in the town of Mühlhausen, central Germany, is the second-largest church building in Thuringia after Erfurt Cathedral. It was constructed mainly during the 14th century in the Gothic style. The church's 86.7-metre-high (284 ft 5 in) central spire, built from 1898 to 1903, is the highest in the state and forms a significant feature of the town's skyline. St. Mary's was a site of events relating to the German Peasants' War around 1525, as the revolutionary leader Thomas Müntzer was active as a pastor at the church. The Sauer organ, built in 1891, is considered the largest surviving 19th-century organ in Thuringia.

== Building ==
The church is a five-aisled Gothic hall church built of local travertine. The central nave is twice as wide as the side aisles. At the western end of the church are the three steeples: two side spires, roughly 42 m (137 ft 10 in) high, and the main 86.7 m (284 ft 5 in) high central spire. The towers have a square ground plan and substructure, with an octagonal superstructure on top. On the eastern side are three choirs, a large central choir flanked by two smaller ones. The central choir appears tall and slender, which is typical of the Gothic period. The northern side choir was a baptismal chapel dedicated to Saint Nicholas, while the sacristy is located under the southern one.

The interior of the hall church is divided by four rows of each five slender, high columns into 30 rectangles. In the Medieval period, the matroneum housed a library (which was common for larger churches to have at the time). The transept of the church is as wide as the nave and does not protrude from the overall width of the church at its ends.

The south portal of the transept, which serves as the main entrance to the church, is elaborately structured and ornamented in a way typical of the Gothic style. Two side pillars make the portal appear visually prominent and wider, although it is aligned with the side wall of the church. On the illusory balcony above the centre of the portal are four statues looking down on the square in front of the church. They represent Emperor Charles IV, his wife Elisabeth of Pomerania, as well as two of his children, perhaps also a court lady and a courtier. The figures, now colourless, were once painted. Above the illusory balcony is an image of Jesus Christ as the Judge of the World. There are numerous sculptures at the church gate. They were destroyed in 1525 during the Peasants' War and only restored around 1900.

The fact that the south portal serves as the main entrance is often explained by pointing to the St. Vitus Cathedral in Prague, which was begun at about the same time, as a model, where the south portal had to serve as the entrance because the nave and west façade were not completed until centuries later. However, churches with a southern main entrance have existed since the early 13th century at the latest, for example Paderborn Cathedral and Herford Minster, which are among the first large hall churches in Germany.

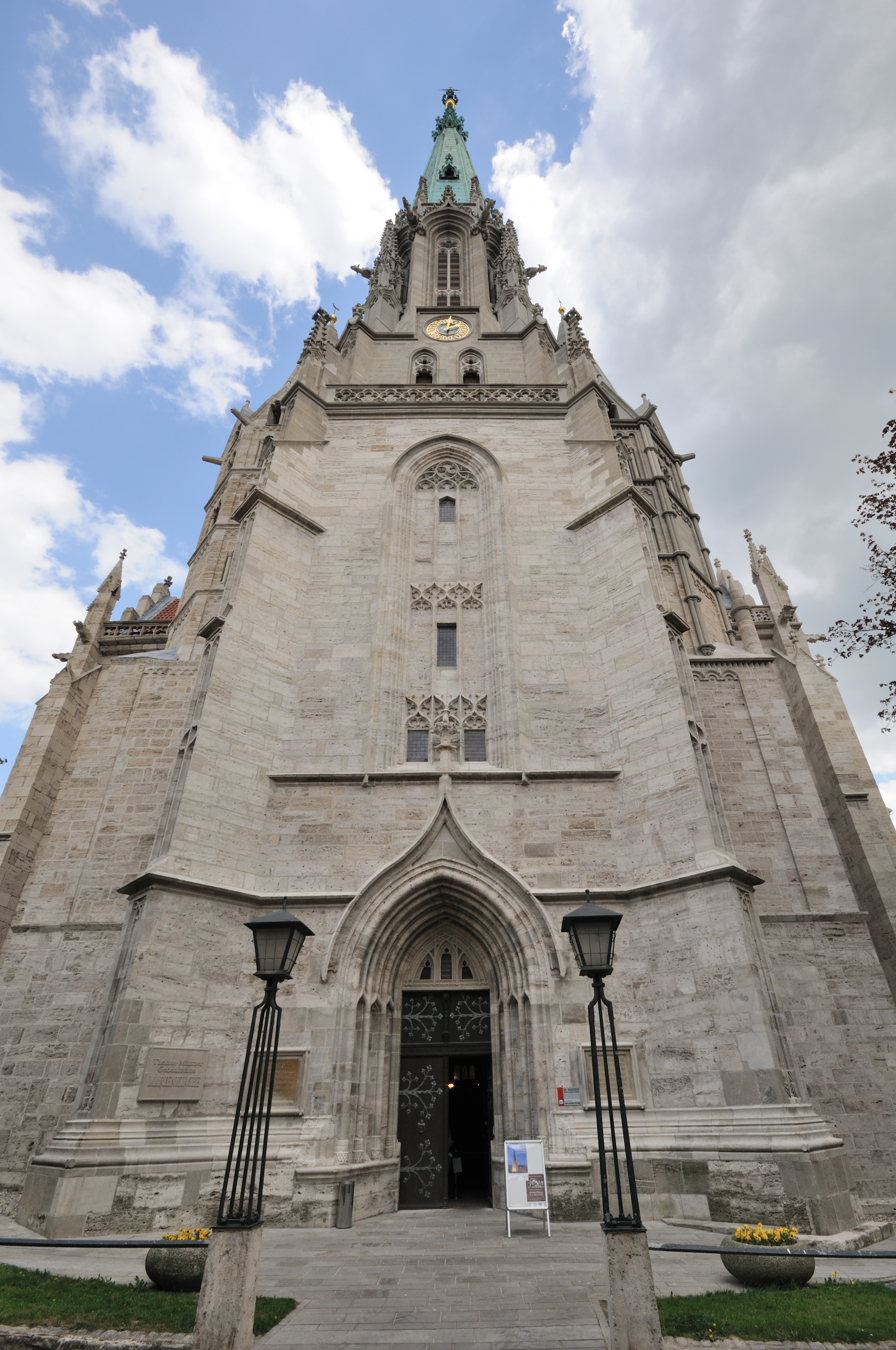
Western portal

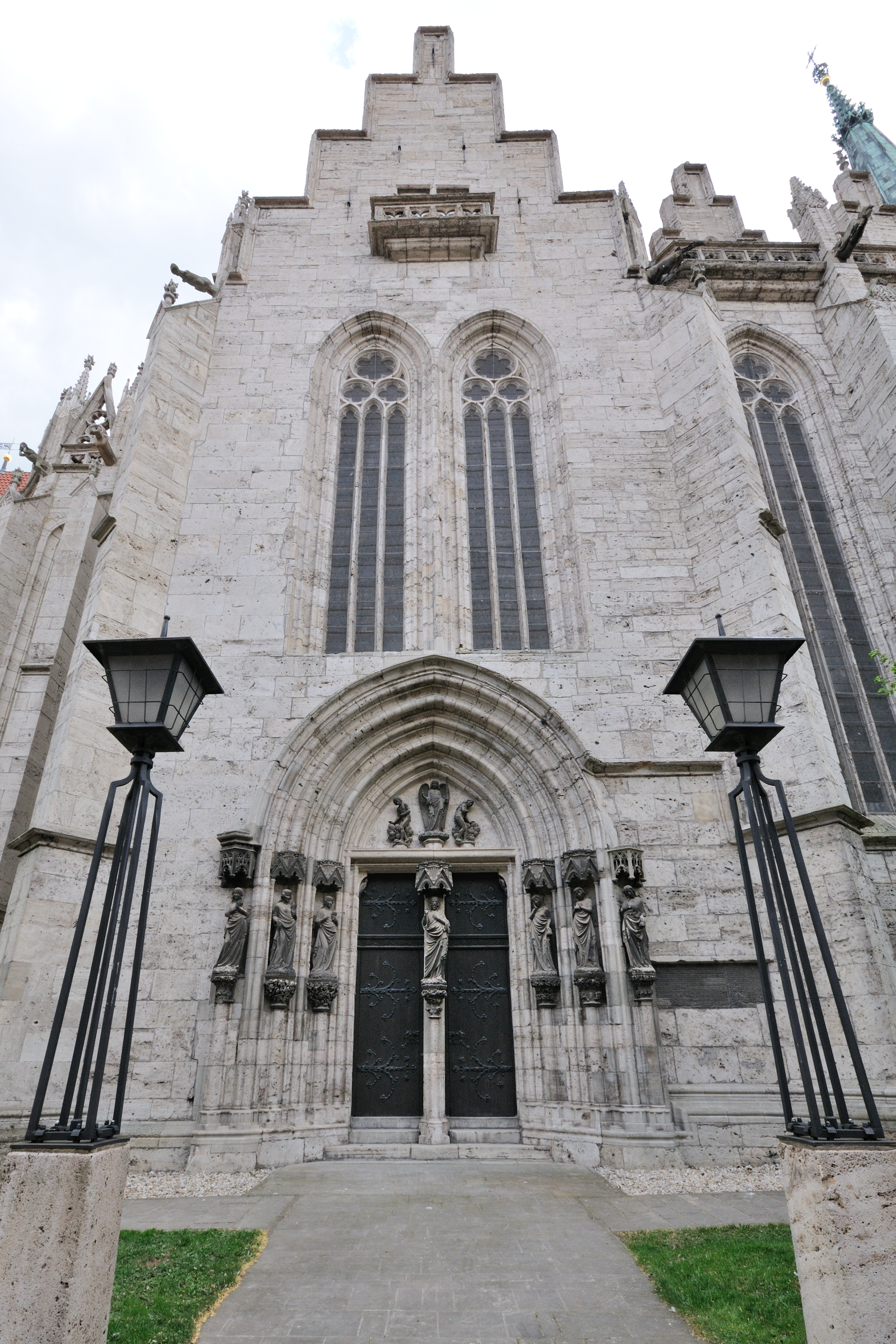
Northeastern portal

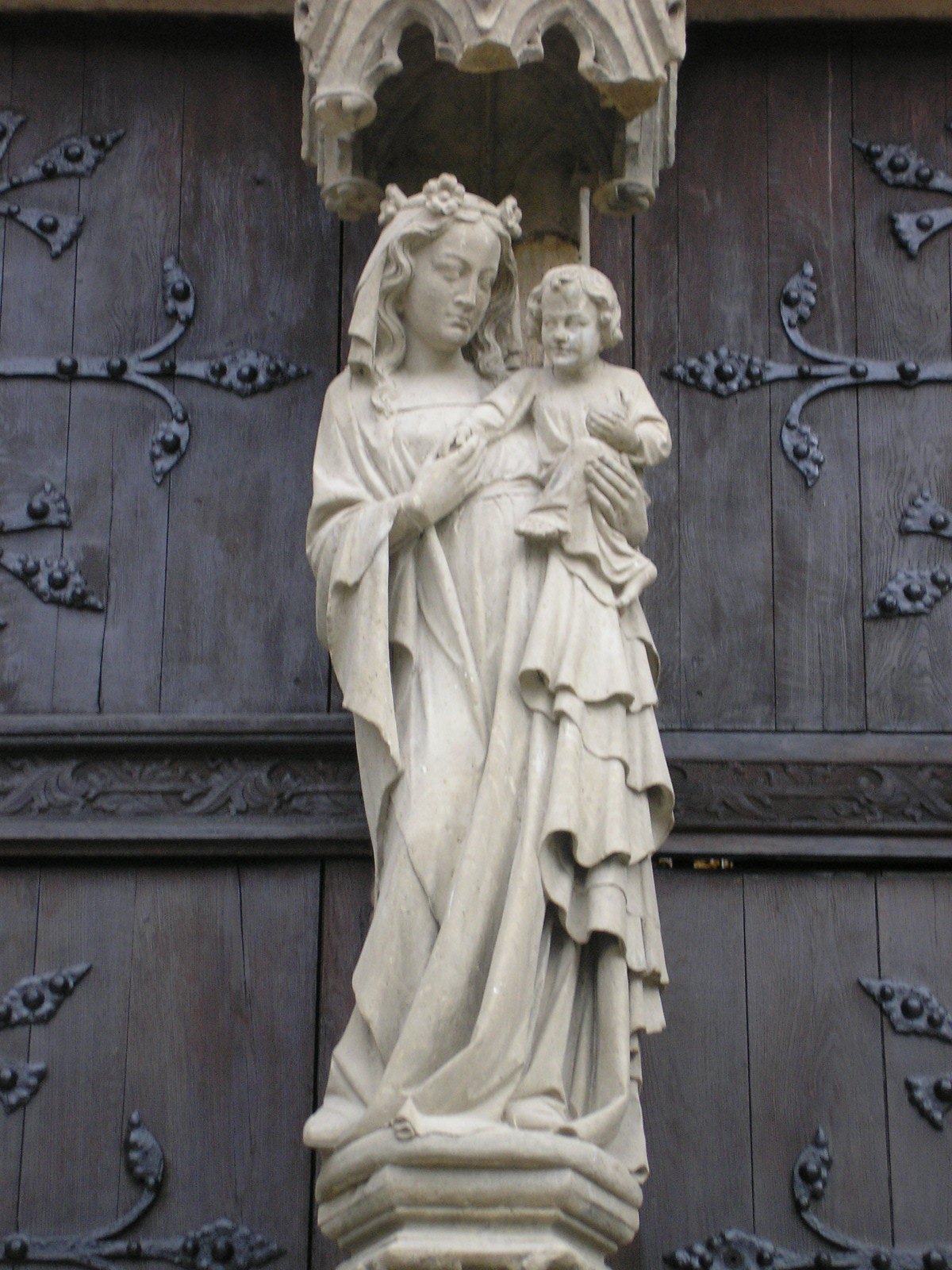
Madonna statue at the main portal

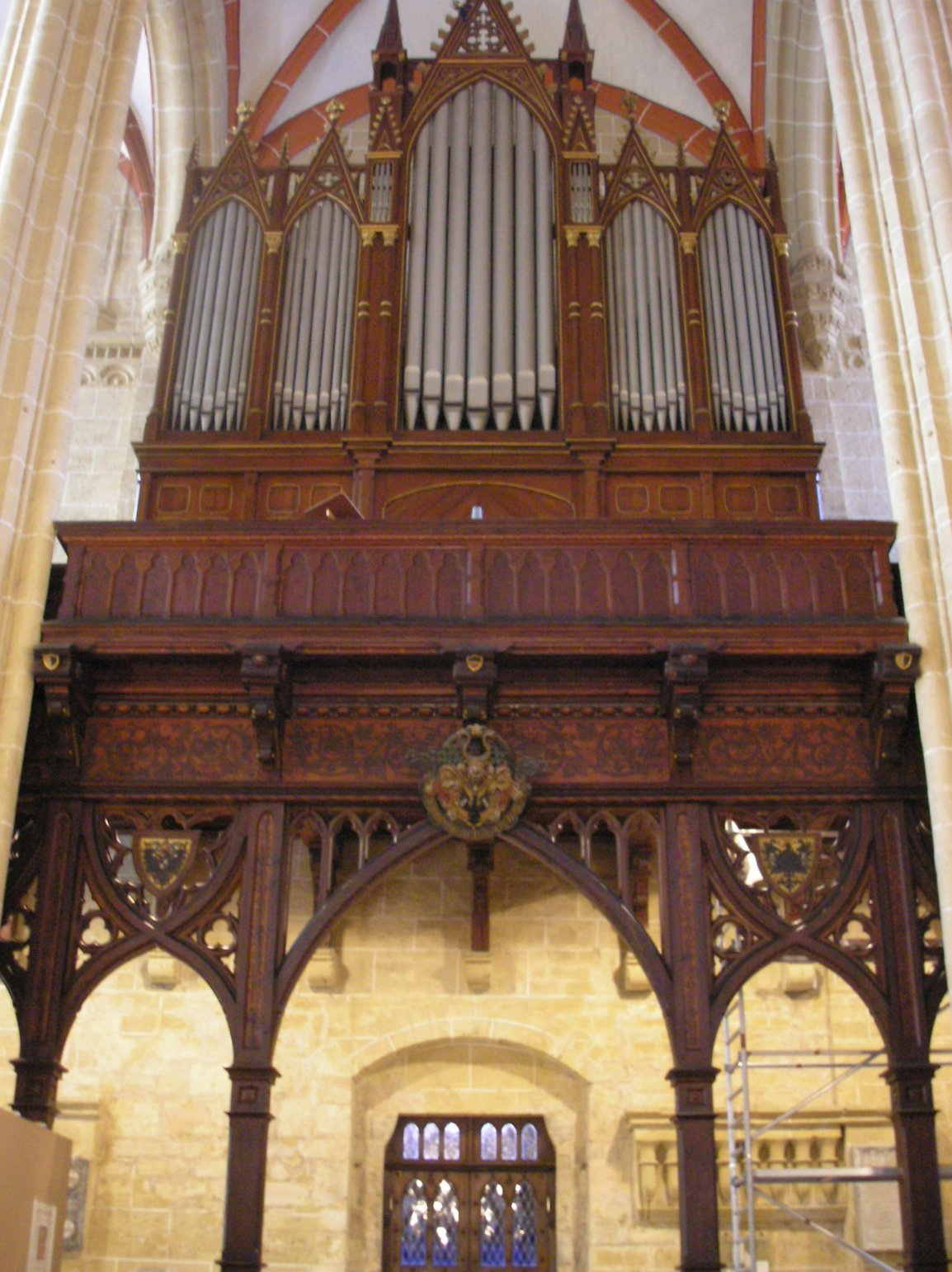
The organ by Wilhelm Sauer

== Bach family ==
Johann Sebastian Bach was employed at Divi Blasii, Mühlhausen's other main church in 1707–1708, and is also known to have performed at St. Mary's. His cantata Gott ist mein König was premiered in the church.

Bach visited St. Mary's in 1735, when his son Johann Gottfried Bernhard Bach was appointed as organist.

== Sources ==
- Aulepp, Rolf (1993). "Neues aus dem alten Mühlhausen. Gräber und Bodenfunde in der Marienkirche. Die eingerillten Fische an der Marienkirche, zwei Glaubenssymbole?". Mühlhäuser Beiträge (in German) (Sonderheft 9). Mühlhäuser Museen: 52–59.
- Badstübner, Ernst (1989). Das alte Mühlhausen. Kunstgeschichte einer mittelalterlichen Stadt (in German). Leipzig: Koehler und Amelang. p. 205. ISBN 3-7338-0055-9.
- Dehio, Georg (2003). Handbuch der deutschen Kunstdenkmäler Thüringen (in German). München: Deutscher Kunstverlag. ISBN 3-422-03095-6.
- Richter, Christa (1990). "Die Marienkirche zu Mühlhausen". Mühlhäuser Beiträge (in German) (Sonderheft 7). Mühlhäuser Museen.
