= Divi Blasii =

Coordinates: 51°12′26″N 10°27′30″E

- St. Blaise's
- German: Divi-Blasii-Kirche
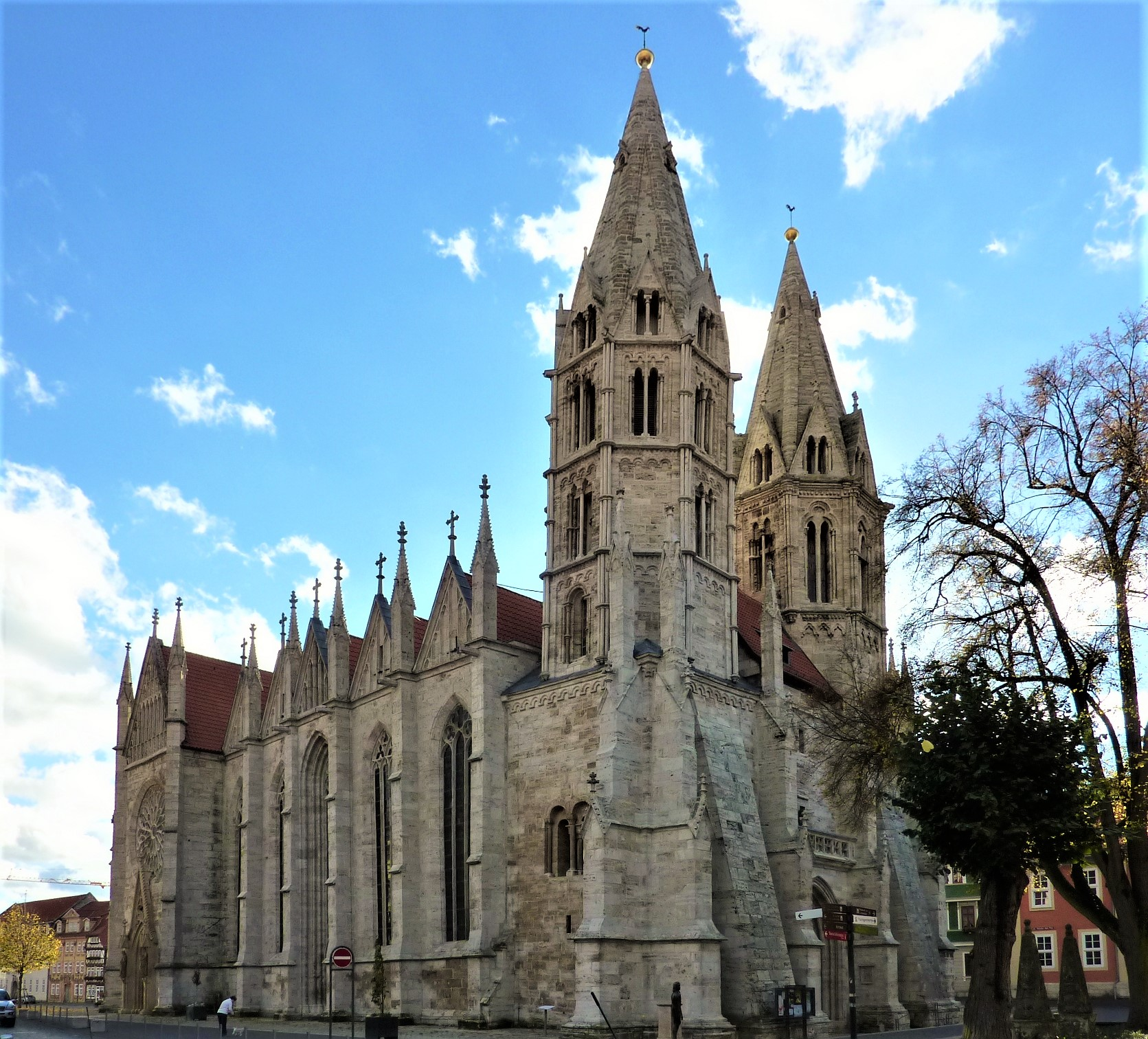
- Side view, facing southeast

- Location within Thuringia Location within Germany
- Location: Mühlhausen, Thuringia
- Country: Germany
- Denomination: Lutheran
- Previous denomination: Roman Catholic

History
- Status: Parish church
- Founded: Middle Ages
- Founder: Teutonic Knights
- Dedication: St. Blaise

Architecture
- Functional status: Active
- Architectural type: Hall church
- Style: Gothic
- Years built: 13th to 14th century

Divi Blasii is a Gothic church in the Thuringian town of Mühlhausen, central Germany. Besides St Mary's, it is one of Mühlhausen's two principal churches. Divi Blasii is a three-aisle, cruciform hall church, situated on the Untermarkt (Lower Market) in the historical centre of the town. The elaborately designed display façade with tracery, pinnacles and a wheel window on the north side is located on an old trade route. Today, Divi Blasii is the central parish church of the Lutheran parish of Mühlhausen within the Protestant Church in Central Germany.

== History ==
The Teutonic Order began building this church around 1276. Predecessor buildings date back to the early 12th century.

In 1556, the Teutonic Order left the church to a Lutheran congregation. It was named after Saint Blaise, and is thus also referred to as "St Blaise's", "St Blasius's" or "Blasius Church". Around 1600, the Latin name sanctus Blasius ("holy Blasius") was replaced by divus Blasius ("divine Blasius"), in the genitive [ecclesia] divi Blasii ("[church] of Blaise the Divine").

Johann Sebastian Bach was organist here from July 1707 to July 1708. The locals appreciated his talent. They commissioned a new organ built to his specifications. To mark the change of the city's council in 1708, he composed the festive cantata Gott ist mein König ("God is my King") for performance in the two principal churches. The council paid for it to be printed and it is the only Bach cantata to survive in a print from his lifetime.

With the introduction of the Prussian Union Agenda of 1817, the church became part of the Prussian Union of Churches (EUK). Since secularisation, it has been the central church of the Protestant parish of Mühlhausen and a venue for concerts and art exhibitions.

== Architecture ==
Divi Blasii is a hall church with nave and side aisles of approximately equal height. In the north transept is a tracery rose window, slightly smaller than that of Notre-Dame in Paris. Under the tracery rose, there is a Wimperg portal on the north exterior. The tracery rose, the Wimperg portal and the choir polygon – here especially the low plinth storey, the high windows and the roof gables – clearly show influences from cathedral buildings in northern France. The nave and the choir polygon, built around 1276–82, form a cross-ribbed vault. Two keystones in the choir are decorated with an eagle and a lion, both signs of Christ's virtues.

On the west side are two octagonal, 42-metre-high (138 ft) stone towers from a previous building dating from around 1245–65. The tower bases are characterised by Romanesque style elements. In the south-west tower, there is a bell from 1281. The towers have similarities with the two small towers of the neighbouring St Mary's Church. Both are out of plumb due to insufficient foundations. Access to the church today is via the west entrance. Above the west portal is a tympanum depicting the crucifixion of Christ.

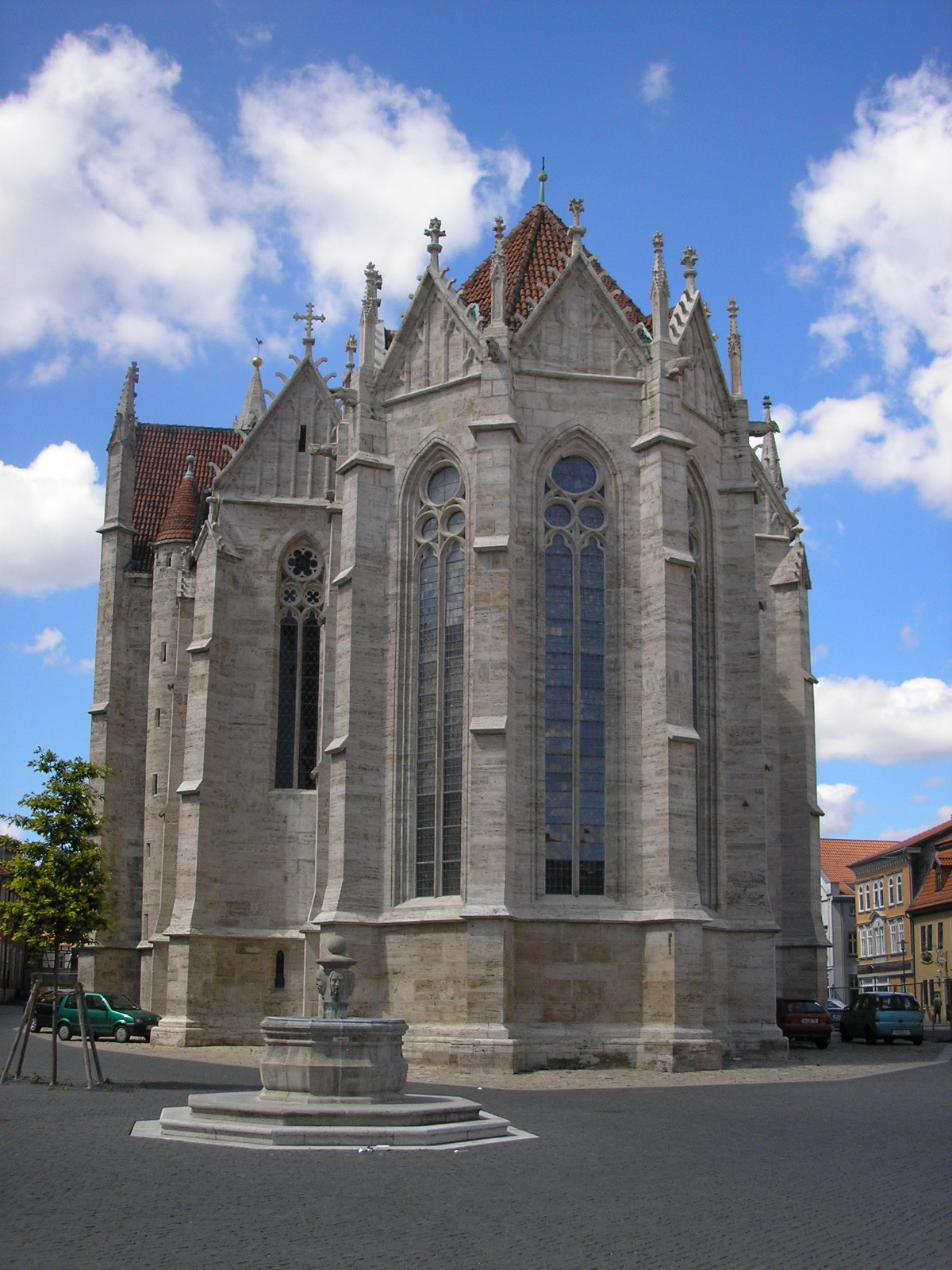
Side view, facing west

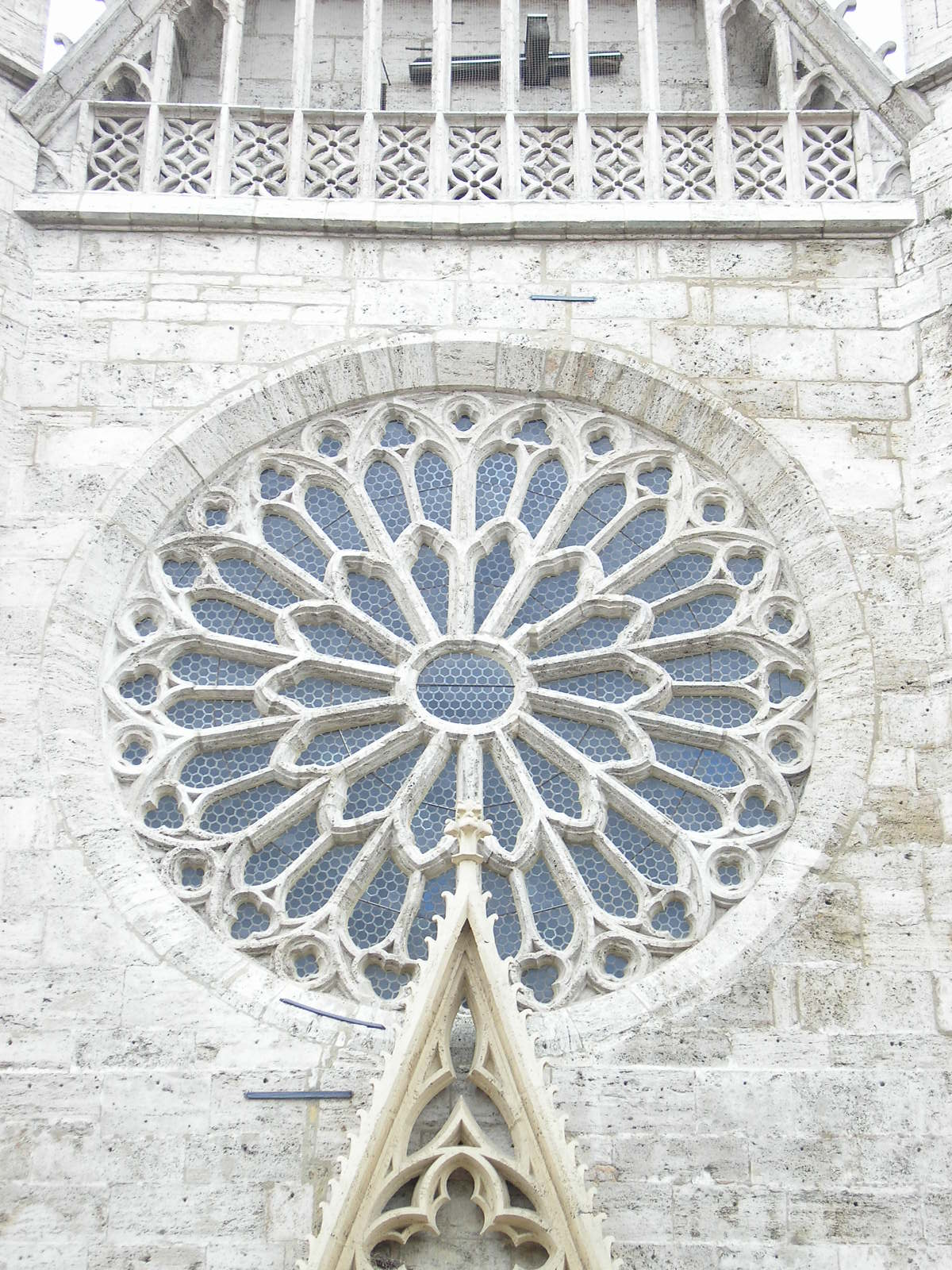
Rose window, looking south

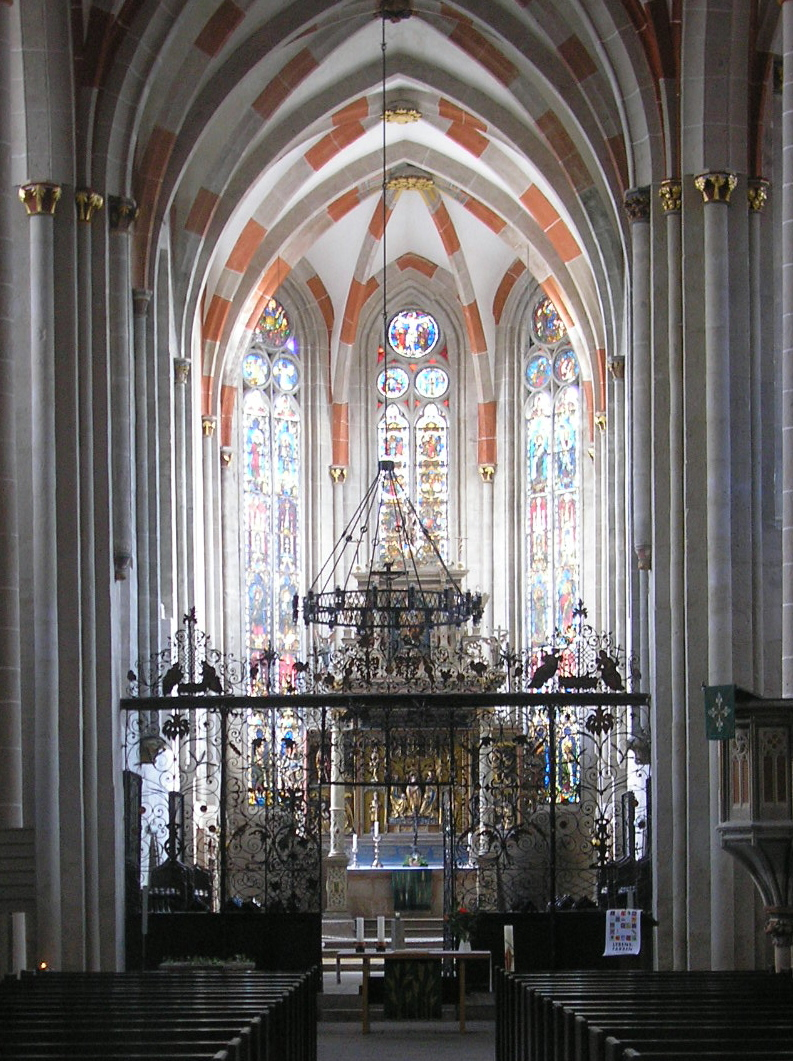
Interior view

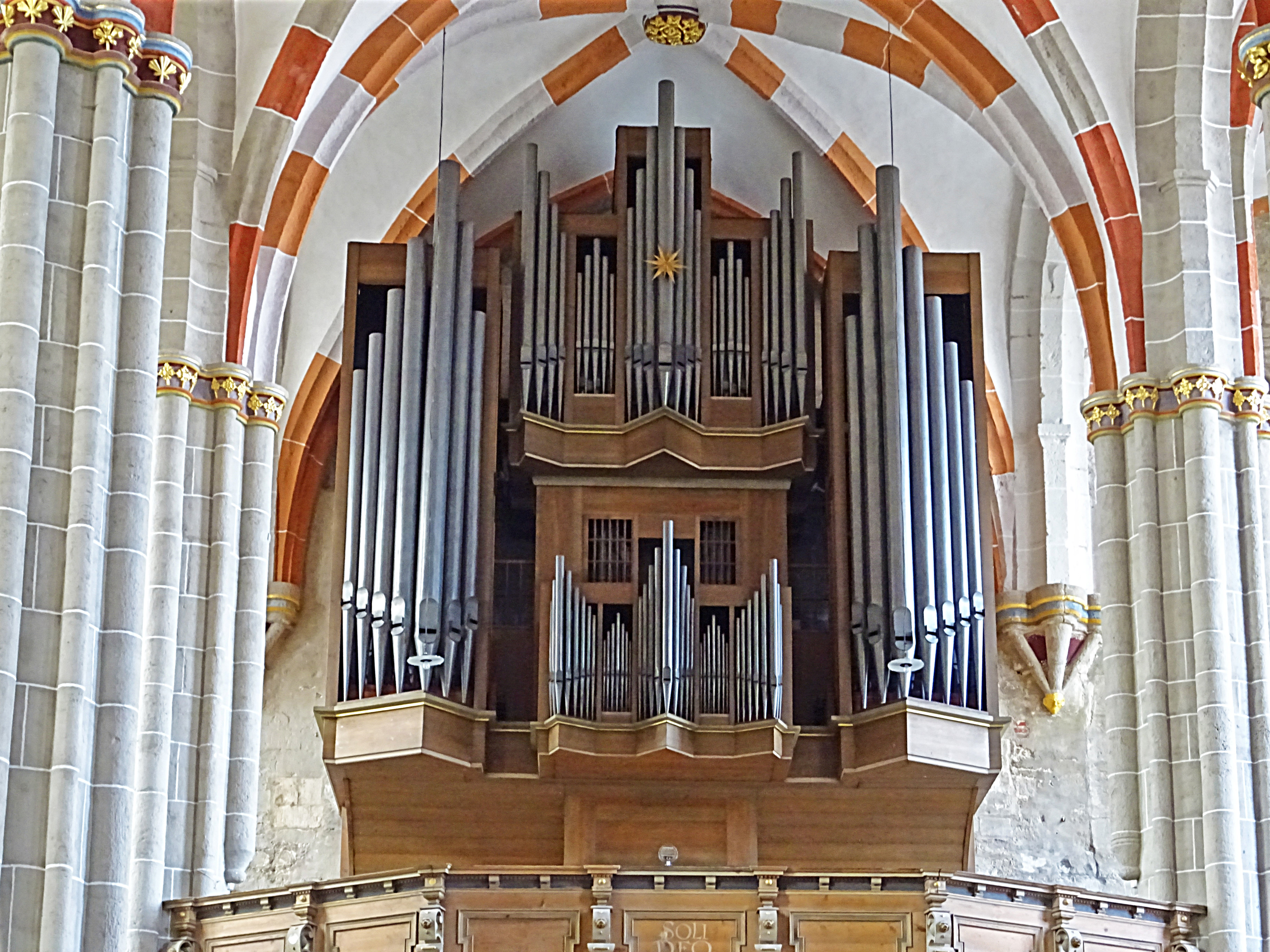
The Schuke organ

== Treasures ==
Inside the church, there are important gravestones from the 13th and 14th centuries, a late Gothic pulpit, epitaphs from the Renaissance period, an octagonal baptismal font from 1596, and a Luther statue from 1903. Around 1543 and 1548, the interior's convertible altars were destroyed during the iconoclasm. The high altar in the choir polygon has been largely preserved and shows the life of the Virgin Mary and depictions of saints. The choir and crossing are separated by a forged lattice from the Baroque period dating from around 1640. The choir also houses, among other things, a portrait of the former Mühlhausen superintendent and church hymn poet Ludwig Helmbold. On the choir walls are tombstones of ecclesiastical dignitaries.

The choir windows date from 1310–1330 and depict St John the Baptist and St Blasius of Sebaste. The seven old choir windows were restored by the Linnemann workshop in Frankfurt around 1900, and Alexander Linnemann also redesigned six windows with figurative depictions. Documents on this can be found in the Linnemann archive.

The Gothic arched windows of Divi Blasii are said to have served as a model for the architect Johann August Röbling (later John A. Roebling), who came from Mühlhausen and emigrated to the USA, when he designed the towers of the Brooklyn Bridge between the New York boroughs of Manhattan and Brooklyn.

== Organ ==
Johann Sebastian Bach was organist of the church in 1707–1708. Although he did not stay in the town for long, the authorities recognised his musical abilities, and made him the consultant for rebuilding the organ. This involved replacing an old two-manual instrument.

Bach's specifications for the new organ have survived: he required three manuals, pedals, and 37 stops. The project was undertaken by the respected local organ builder Johann Friedrich Wender. Wender's previous work included a two-manual instrument at the New Church in Arnstadt (today known as the Bach Church), with which Bach was familiar as he was employed there before coming to Mühlhausen. The Mühlhausen organ was completed in 1709, by which time Bach had been succeeded as organist by his cousin Johann Friedrich Bach. However, there is evidence that Bach returned to the town to inaugurate the instrument. It has been suggested that one of his works, a version for three manuals and pedals of A Mighty Fortress Is Our God (catalogued as BWV 720), may have been written specially for it.

Wender's organ of 1709 has not survived. However, the present instrument on the west gallery was built according to Bach's specifications. Albert Schweitzer, as an organist, Bach connoisseur and leading person in the organ reform movement, was involved in its planning, of which the stoplist designed by Bach especially for this church served as the basis. The new instrument was built by the Alexander Schuke organ building company in the 1950s as their opus 293, it was originally inaugurated in 1959 and again after a general overhaul on 14 September 2008. It is one of the few organs in the world to have been built according to a specific stoplist made by Bach. The instrument has three manuals and 42 stops; a few stops were added to Bach's design so that also the timbres of modern organ music can be played authentically.

== Bells ==
Three valuable medieval large bells hang in the two west towers. The large bell in the north tower was cast in 1345. It weighs around 5½ tonnes and, like the smaller mass bell from 1448, is adorned with rare bell carvings of artistic and historical significance. The Sunday bell from 1281 is considered the oldest dated bell in Thuringia.

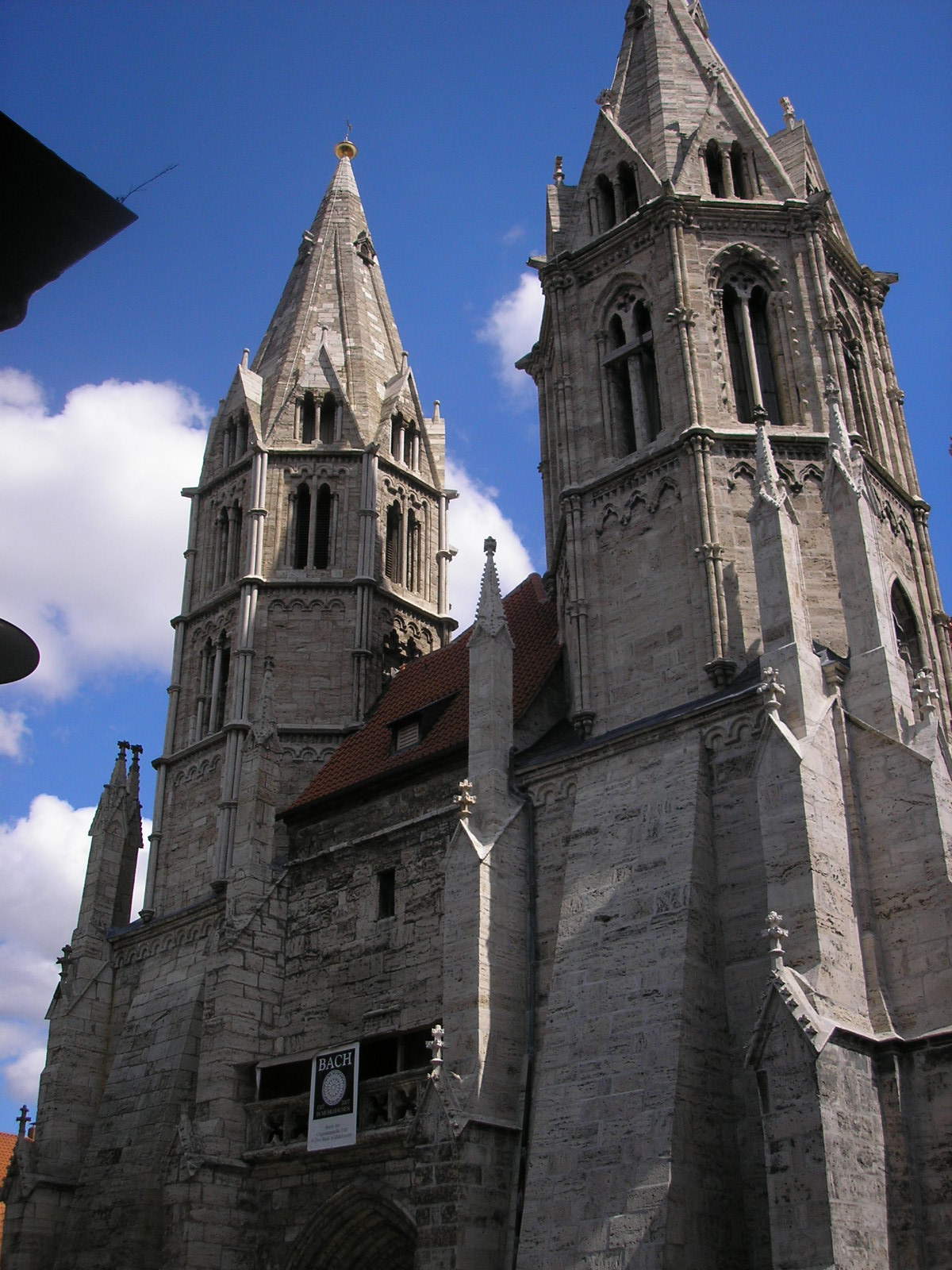
The two spires, looking northeast

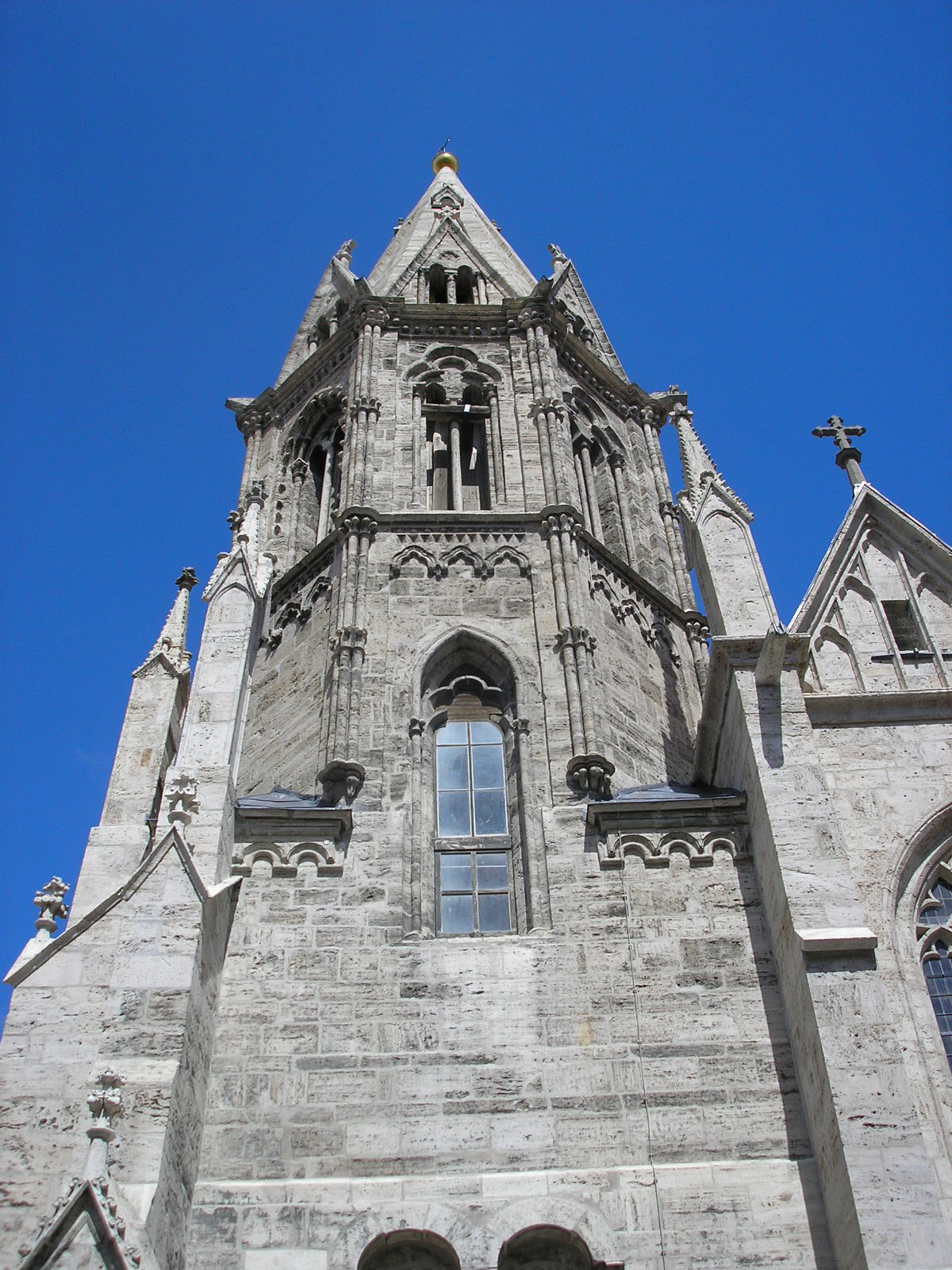
Southern spire

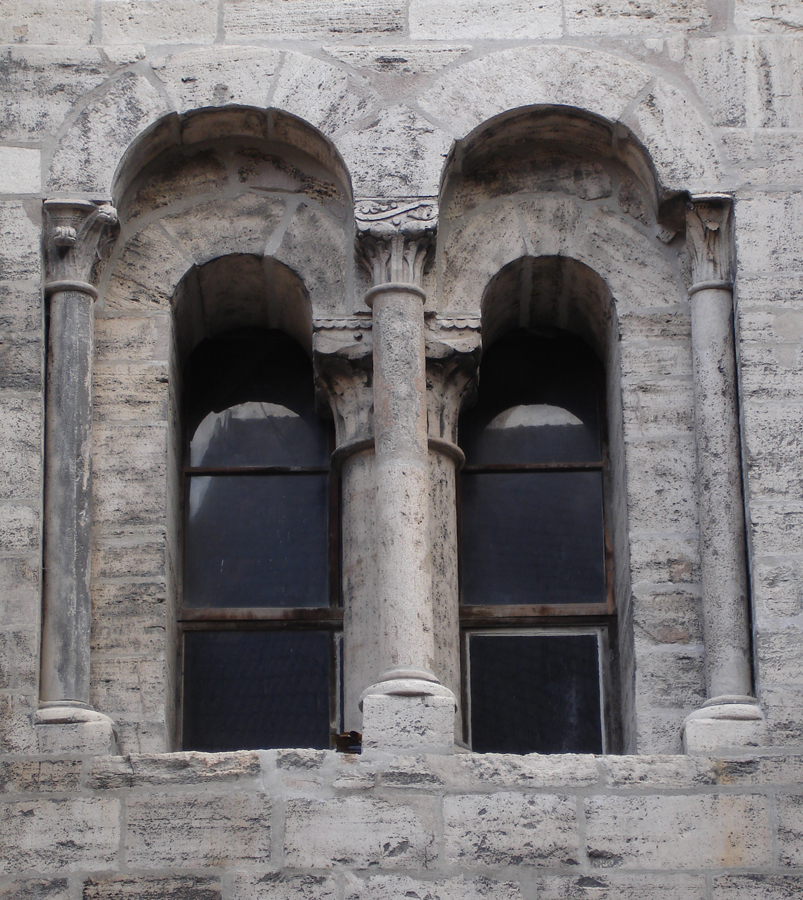
Detail of the southern spire socket

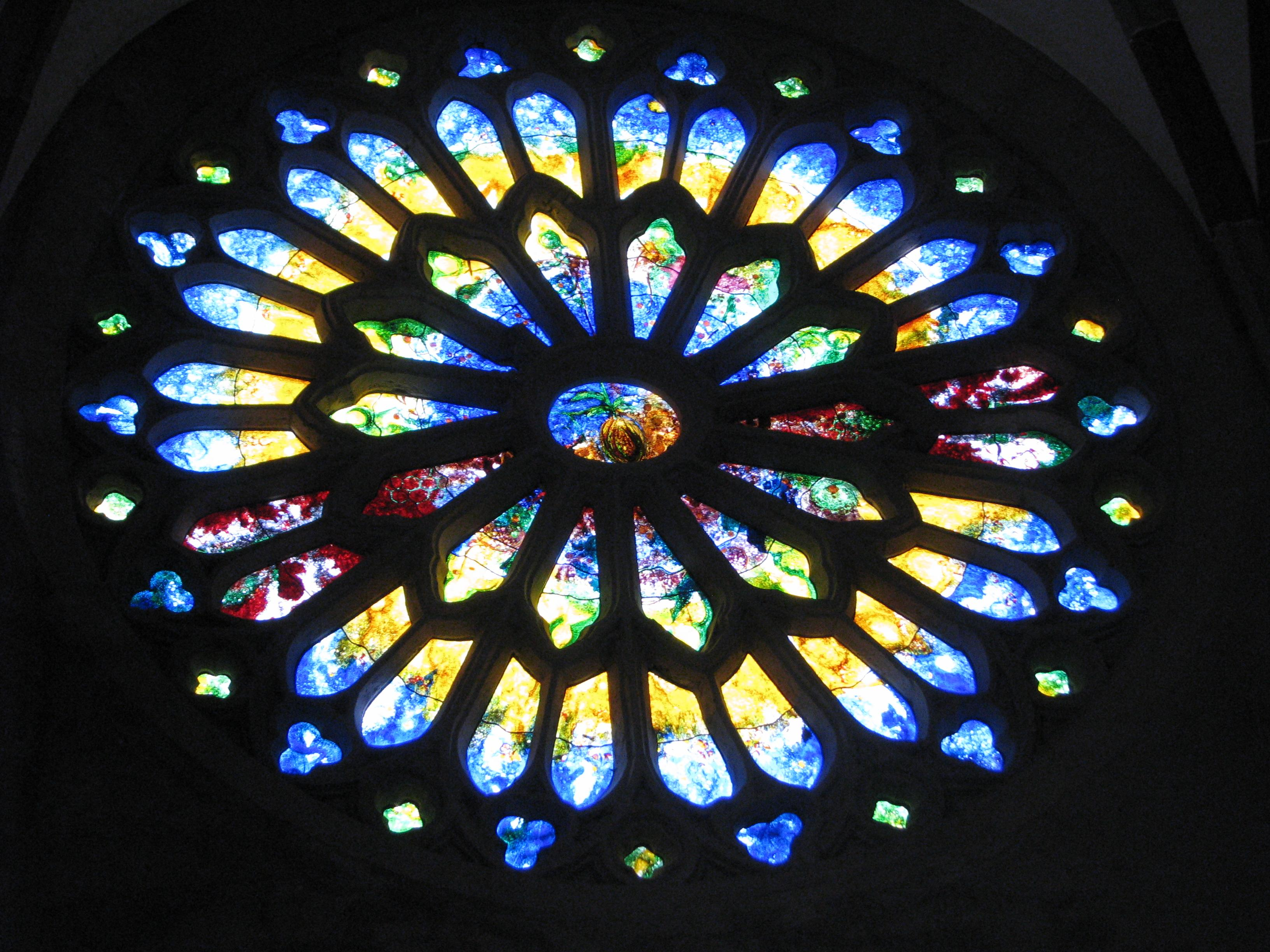
Rose window at the north transept

== Bibliography ==
- Altersberger, Jakob (2013). Untersuchungen zur Kirchengeschichte Mühlhausens im Mittelalter (in German). Universität Wien. pp. 47–51. doi:10.25365/thesis.25372.
- Badstübner, Ernst (1989). Das alte Mühlhausen. Kunstgeschichte einer mittelalterlichen Stadt (in German). Leipzig: Koehler & Amelang. ISBN 3-7338-0055-9.
- Günther, Gerhard; Korf, Winfried (1986). Mühlhausen. Thomas-Müntzer-Stadt (in German). Leipzig: E. A. Seemann. ISBN 3-363-00018-9.
- Joneitis, Diana; Scheibner, Susanne, eds. (2011). Die Glasmalereien der Divi Blasii Kirche in Mühlhausen, Thüringen (in German). Altenburg: Reinhold. ISBN 978-3-937940-77-9.
- Wedemeyer, Bernd (1997). Die Blasiuskirche in Mühlhausen und die thüringische Sakralbaukunst zwischen 1270 und 1350 (in German). Berlin: Wasmuth. ISBN 3-00-000150-6.
