= Church cantatas of Bach's third to fifth year in Leipzig =

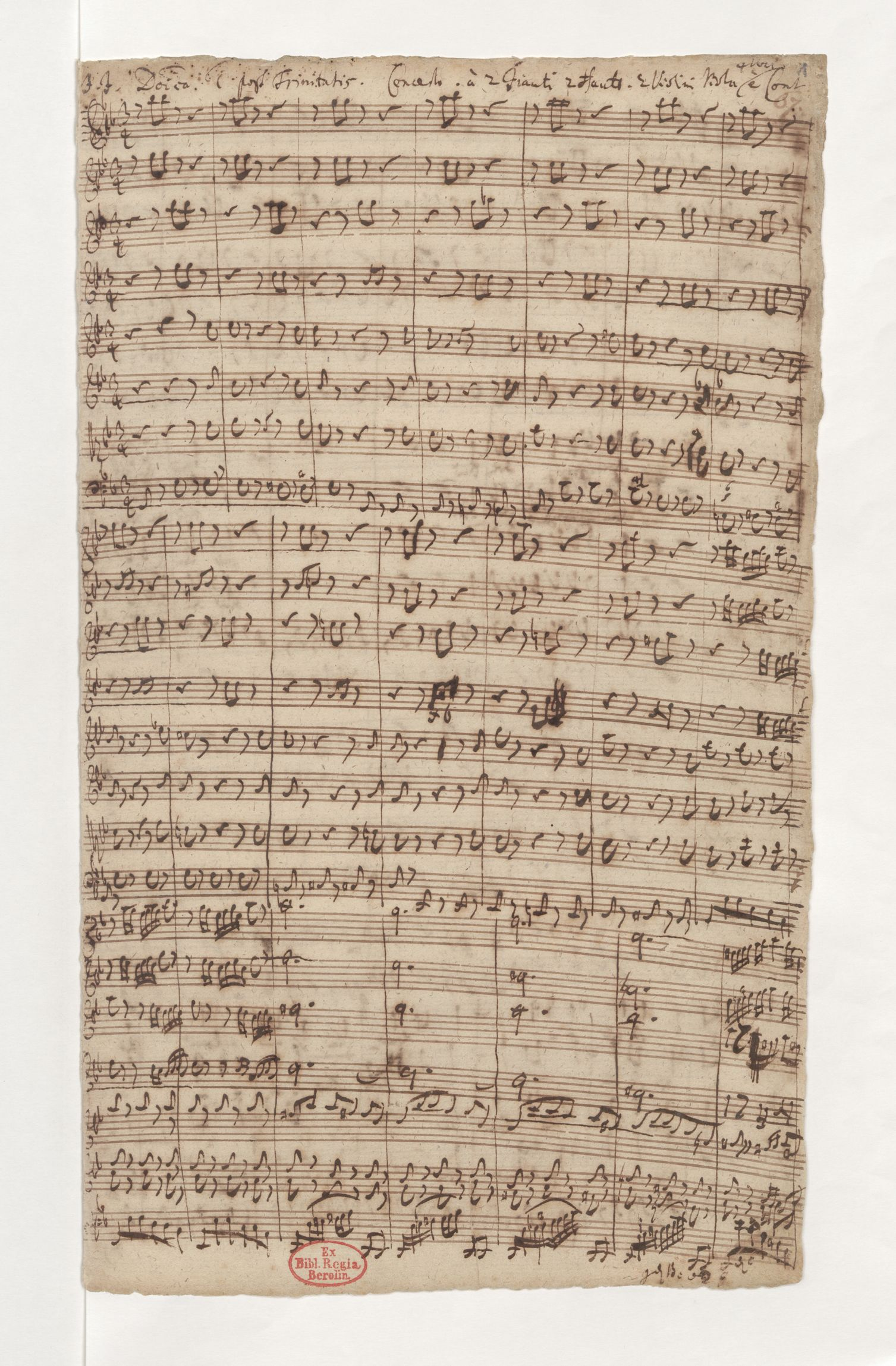
Bach's autograph of the start (sinfonia) of Brich dem Hungrigen dein Brot, BWV 39, the cantata for the first Sunday after Trinity in 1726, which is the first cantata of his fourth year in Leipzig, composed halfway through his third cycle

On Trinity Sunday 27 May 1725 Johann Sebastian Bach had presented the last cantata of his second cantata cycle, the cycle which coincided with his second year in Leipzig. As director musices of the principal churches in Leipzig he presented a variety of cantatas over the next three years. New cantatas for occasions of the liturgical year composed in this period, except for a few in the chorale cantata format, are known as Bach's third cantata cycle. His next cycle of church cantatas, the Picander cycle, did not start before St. John's Day 24 June 1728.

Sacred music of this period by Bach that does not belong to a cantata cycle includes council election cantatas, Passion music for Good Friday, and music for weddings and funerals.

== Annually returning services ==
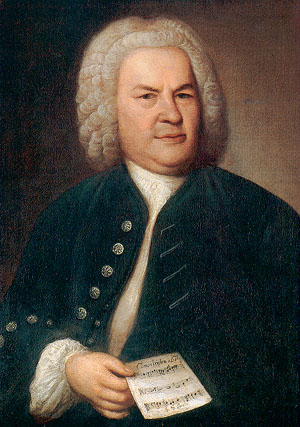
Johann Sebastian Bach

After Trinity of 1725 Johann Sebastian Bach began a third annual cycle, but with less consistency than the previous two. The oldest extant cantata of the third cycle was composed for the ninth Sunday after Trinity 1725. The third cycle cantata for the first Sunday after Trinity was only composed in 1726. The cycle extends over several years. The cantatas from 1727 have however also been termed as "between the third and the fourth cycles".

There are 35 extant cantatas of the third cantata cycle, for a period with around 170 occasions. For about half of the other occasions a few new chorale cantatas by Bach (retrospectively added to the chorale cantata cycle), restagings of older compositions or presentations of works by other composers are known. Bach had acquired a cycle of cantatas by his second cousin Johann Ludwig Bach of Meiningen. Together with his assistants he provided performance material for at least 18 of these cantatas, for which the Leipzig premieres are known, from Purification (2 February) to Trinity XIII (15 September) 1726.

Instrumental music used in third cycle cantatas:
Opening sinfonia of BWV 169, for organ and orchestra
In later BWV 1053/1 arrangement (performed by Matthew Ganong and the Advent Chamber Orchestra)

Movement 5 (Aria) of BWV 169
In later BWV 1053/2 arrangement (performed by Matthew Ganong and the Advent Chamber Orchestra)

Opening sinfonia of BWV 49, for organ and orchestra
In later BWV 1053/3 arrangement (performed by Matthew Ganong and the Advent Chamber Orchestra)

Johann Sebastian Bach's compositions have a number according to the BWV catalogue, while Johann Ludwig Bach's have a JLB number. Through an erroneous attribution to the former the cantata Denn du wirst meine Seele nicht in der Hölle lassen, JLB 21, is also known by a BWV number. The version of the St Mark Passion attributed to Keiser which Bach presented on Good Friday 1726, including the chorale harmonisations BWV 500a and 1084, is indicated by a Bach Compendium (BC) number. Known works staged under Bach's directorate can in most cases also be indicated by a Bach Digital Work (BDW) number provided by the Bach-digital website.

As far as extant, Bach's third cantata cycle covers 35 of the 64 occasions of an "ideal" Leipzig cantata cycle:
- Trinity I: BWV 39 (1726)
- Trinity V: BWV 88 (1726)
- Trinity VI: BWV 170 (1726)
- Trinity VII: BWV 187 (1726)
- Trinity VIII: BWV 45 (1726)
- Trinity IX: BWV 168 (1725)
- Trinity X: BWV 102 (1726)
- Trinity XII: BWV 35 (1726)
- Trinity XIII: BWV 164 (1725)
- Trinity XIV: BWV 17 (1726)
- St. Michael's Day: BWV 19 (1726)
- Trinity XVI: BWV 27 (1726)
- Trinity XVII: BWV 47 (1726)
- Trinity XVIII: BWV 169 (1726)
- Trinity XIX: BWV 56 (1726)
- Reformation Day: BWV 79 (1725)
- Trinity XX: BWV 49 (1726)
- Trinity XXI: BWV 98 (1726)
- Trinity XXII: BWV 55 (1726)
- Trinity XXIII: BWV 52 (1726)
- Christmas: BWV 110 (1725)
- Christmas 2: BWV 57 (1725)
- Christmas 3: BWV 151 (1725)
- Christmas I: BWV 28 (1725)
- New Year: BWV 16 (1726)
- New Year I: BWV 58 (1727)
- Epiphany I: BWV 32 (1726)
- Epiphany II: BWV 13 (1726)
- Epiphany III: BWV 72 (1726)
- Purification: BWV 82 (1727)
- Septuagesima: BWV 84 (1727)
- Easter III: BWV 146 (1726 or 1728)
- Ascension: BWV 43 (1726)
- Pentecost: BWV 34 (1727)
- Pentecost 2: BWV 173 (1727)

Historians of music studying the cycle have noted a greater use of solo organ parts, speculated to have been played by Bach or his son [WHICH ONE?], a wide range of texts and movements apparently borrowed from previous instrumental works.

Alternatively, Bach's third cycle is described as starting with the Christmas season of 1725, running, with inclusion of the 18 JLB cantatas, for a liturgical year, and thus ending before Advent of 1726. In that format, the cycle covers over 40 occasions:
- Christmas: BWV 110
- Christmas 2: BWV 57
- Christmas 3: BWV 151
- Christmas I: BWV 28
- New Year: BWV 16
- Epiphany I: BWV 32
- Epiphany II: BWV 13
- Epiphany III: BWV 72
- Purification: JLB 9
- Epiphany IV: JLB 1
- Epiphany V: JLB 2
- Septuagesima: JLB 3
- Sexagesima: JLB 4
- Estomihi: JLB 5
- Easter: JLB 21 (a.k.a. BWV 15)
- Easter 2: JLB 10
- Easter 3: JLB 11
- Easter I: JLB 6
- Easter II: JLB 12
- Easter III: JLB 8 (+BWV 146?)
- Easter IV: JLB 14
- Ascension: BWV 43
- Trinity: (BWV 194 restaged)
- Trinity I: BWV 39
- St. John's Day: JLB 17
- Visitation: JLB 13
- Trinity V: BWV 88
- Trinity VI: BWV 170 and JLB 7
- Trinity VII: BWV 187
- Trinity VIII: BWV 45
- Trinity X: BWV 102
- Trinity XI: JLB 15
- Trinity XII: BWV 35
- Trinity XIII: JLB 16
- Trinity XIV: BWV 17
- St. Michael's Day: BWV 19
- Trinity XVI: BWV 27
- Trinity XVII: BWV 47
- Trinity XVIII: BWV 169
- Trinity XIX: BWV 56
- Trinity XX: BWV 49
- Trinity XXI: BWV 98
- Trinity XXII: BWV 55
- Trinity XXIII: BWV 52

Very little is known about the cantatas for recurring occasions in the year preceding the fourth cantata cycle, at least there is no new composition extant that with certainty can be attributed to the period from Trinity I 1727 to the start of that next cycle.

J. S. Bach's 3rd, 4th and 5th year as director musices in Leipzig
Occasion	1725–26	1726–27	1727–28	J. S. Bach's third cycle
Trinity I	3 June	23 June: BWV 39	15 June	Brich dem Hungrigen dein Brot
Trinity II	10 June: BWV 76^{I}? (Note: Older composition possibly restaged on this day)	30 June	22 June	
Trinity III	17 June: BDW 01669 (Note: Possibly by Telemann, only text extant in Texte Zur Leipziger Kirchen-Music, Auf den Dritten Sonntag nach Trinitatis, Das Fest Johannis des Täufers, Ingleichen Den fünfften Sonntag Trinitatis, Das Fest der Heimsuchung Mariä, Und Den sechsten Sonntag Trinitatis. Leipzig: Immanuel Tietzen (1725))	7 July	29 June	(BDW 1669: early version of BWV 177?) (Note: Chorale cantata adopted into the chorale cantata cycle)
St. John's Day	24 June: BDW 01673	24 June: JLB 17	24 June	
Trinity IV	(24 June=St. John's D.)	14 July	6 July	
Trinity V	1 July: BDW 11069	21 July: BWV 88	13 July	Siehe, ich will viel Fischer aussenden
Visitation	2 July: BDW 01672	2 July: JLB 13	2 July	
Trinity VI	8 July: BDW 01670	28 July: BWV 170, JLB 7	20 July	Vergnügte Ruh, beliebte Seelenlust
Trinity VII	15 Jul.: BWV Anh. 1/209? (Note: BWV Anh. 1: lost, mentioned in a 1770 catalogue by Breitkopf, possibly identical to TWV 1:617 (or 616?) BWV Anh. 209: lost, a Trinity VII cantata probably composed before 6 February 1727, when it was reused for a funeral service)	4 August: BWV 187	27 July	Es wartet alles auf dich
Trinity VIII	22 July	11 August: BWV 45	3 August	Es ist dir gesagt, Mensch, was gut ist
Trinity IX	29 July: BWV 168	18 August	10 August	Tue Rechnung! Donnerwort
Trinity X	5 August	25 August: BWV 102	17 August	Herr, deine Augen sehen nach dem Glauben
Trinity XI	12 August	1 September: JLB 15	24 August	
Trinity XII	19 August: BWV 137	8 September: BWV 35	31 August: BWV 69a	Geist und Seele wird verwirret
Trinity XIII	26 August: BWV 164	15 September: JLB 16	7 September	Ihr, die ihr euch von Christo nennet
New Council	27 August: BWV Anh. 4	26 August	25 August: BWV 193?	(Ratswechsel cantata not part of the cycle)
Trinity XIV	2 September	22 September: BWV 17	14 September	Wer Dank opfert, der preiset mich
Trinity XV	9 Sept.: BWV Anh. 209?	(29 September=Michaelmas)	21 September	
Trinity XVI	16 Sept.: BWV 161	6 October: BWV 27	28 September	Wer weiß, wie nahe mir mein Ende?
Trinity XVII	23 September	13 October: BWV 47	5 October	Wer sich selbst erhöhet, der soll erniedriget werden
Michaelmas	29 September	29 September: BWV 19	29 September	Es erhub sich ein Streit
Trinity XVIII	30 September	20 October: BWV 169	12 October	Gott soll allein mein Herze haben
Trinity XIX	7 October	27 October: BWV 56	19 October	Ich will den Kreuzstab gerne tragen
Trinity XX	14 October	3 November: BWV 49	26 October	Ich geh und suche mit Verlangen
Trinity XXI	21 October	10 November: BWV 98	2 November	Was Gott tut, das ist wohlgetan
Trinity XXII	28 October	17 November: BWV 55	9 November	Ich armer Mensch, ich Sündenknecht
Reformation D.	31 October: BWV 79	31 October	31 October	Gott der Herr ist Sonn und Schild
Trinity XXIII	4 November	24 November: BWV 52	16 November	Falsche Welt, dir trau ich nicht
Trinity XXIV	11 November	—	23 November	
Trinity XXV	18 November	—	—	
Trinity XXVI	25 November	—	—	
Trinity XXVII	—	—	—	
Advent I	2 December	1 December BWV 36? (Note: Early version of BWV 36 first performed between 1725 and 1730. The later version of this cantata (1731) is better documented, and is assigned to the period after the Picander cycle)	30 Nov. BWV 36?	
Christmas	25 December: BWV 110	25 December	25 December	Unser Mund sei voll Lachens
Christmas 2	26 December: BWV 57	26 December	26 December	Selig ist der Mann
Christmas 3	27 December: BWV 151	27 December	27 December	Süßer Trost, mein Jesus kömmt
Christmas I	30 December: BWV 28	29 December: BWV 152	28 December	Gottlob! nun geht das Jahr zu Ende
New Year	1 January: BWV 16	1 January	1 January	Herr Gott, dich loben wir
New Year I	—	5 January: BWV 58	4 January	Ach Gott, wie manches Herzeleid
Epiphany	6 January	6 January	6 January	
Epiphany I	13 January: BWV 32	12 January	11 January	Liebster Jesu, mein Verlangen
Epiphany II	20 January: BWV 13	19 January	18 January	Meine Seufzer, meine Tränen
Epiphany III	27 January: BWV 72	26 January	—	Alles nur nach Gottes Willen
Purification	2 February: JLB 9	2 Febr.: BWV 82, BWV 83	2 February: BWV 157?	Ich habe genug
Epiphany IV	3 February: JLB 1	(2 February=Purification)	—	
Epiphany V	10 February: JLB 2	—	—	
Epiphany VI	—	—	—	
Septuagesima	17 February: JLB 3	9 February: BWV 84	25 January	Ich bin vergnügt mit meinem Glücke
Sexagesima	24 February: JLB 4	16 February	1 February	
Estomihi	3 March: JLB 5	23 February	8 February: BWV 23	
Annunciation	25 March	25 March	(25 March→Palm Sund.)	
Palm Sunday	14 April: —	6 April: —	21 March: BWV 182 (Note: Restaging of an older composition)	
Good Friday	19 April: BC D 5b	11 April: BWV 244b?	26 March: BWV 245?	(Passion presentation not part of the cycle)
Easter	21 April: JLB 21 (=BWV 15)	13 April	28 March	
Easter 2	22 April: JLB 10	14 April	29 March	
Easter 3	23 April: JLB 11	15 April	30 March	
Easter I	28 April: JLB 6	20 April	4 April	
Easter II	5 May: JLB 12	27 April	11 April	
Easter III	12 May: JLB 8, BWV 146?	4 May	18 April: BWV 146?	Wir müssen durch viel Trübsal
Easter IV	19 May: JLB 14	11 May	25 April	
Easter V	26 May	18 May	2 May	
Ascension	30 May: BWV 43	22 May	6 May	Gott fähret auf mit Jauchzen
Ascension I	2 June	25 May	9 May	
Pentecost	9 June	1 June: BWV 34	16 May	O ewiges Feuer, o Ursprung der Liebe
Pentecost 1	10 June	2 June: BWV 173	17 May	Erhöhtes Fleisch und Blut
Pentecost 2	11 June	3 June: BWV 184	18 May	
Trinity	16 June: BWV 194	8 June: BWV 129	25 May	

== Other occasions ==
Apart from secular cantatas Bach composed in his third to fifth year in Leipzig (BWV 205, Anh. 196, 36a, 249b, 207, 204, Anh. 9, 193a, 198 and 216) also a few cantatas for liturgical occasions likely originated in this period:

- Wedding cantatas: O ewiges Feuer, o Ursprung der Liebe, BWV 34a and Dem Gerechten muß das Licht, BWV 195 (for both cantatas the date is uncertain, but they are usually assumed to belong to this period)
- Funeral cantata: Ich lasse dich nicht, du segnest mich denn, BWV 157 (6 February 1727 in Pomßen near Leipzig – in that funeral service BWV 157 was combined with BWV Anh. 209 as two parts of a funeral cantata). Also the funeral motet Fürchte dich nicht, BWV 228 was performed in this period.
- Chorale cantata with unknown liturgical function, composed between 1728 and 1731: Sei Lob und Ehr dem höchsten Gut, BWV 117

Also the motet for New Year Singet dem Herrn ein neues Lied, BWV 225, would have been first performed in this period.

== Librettos ==
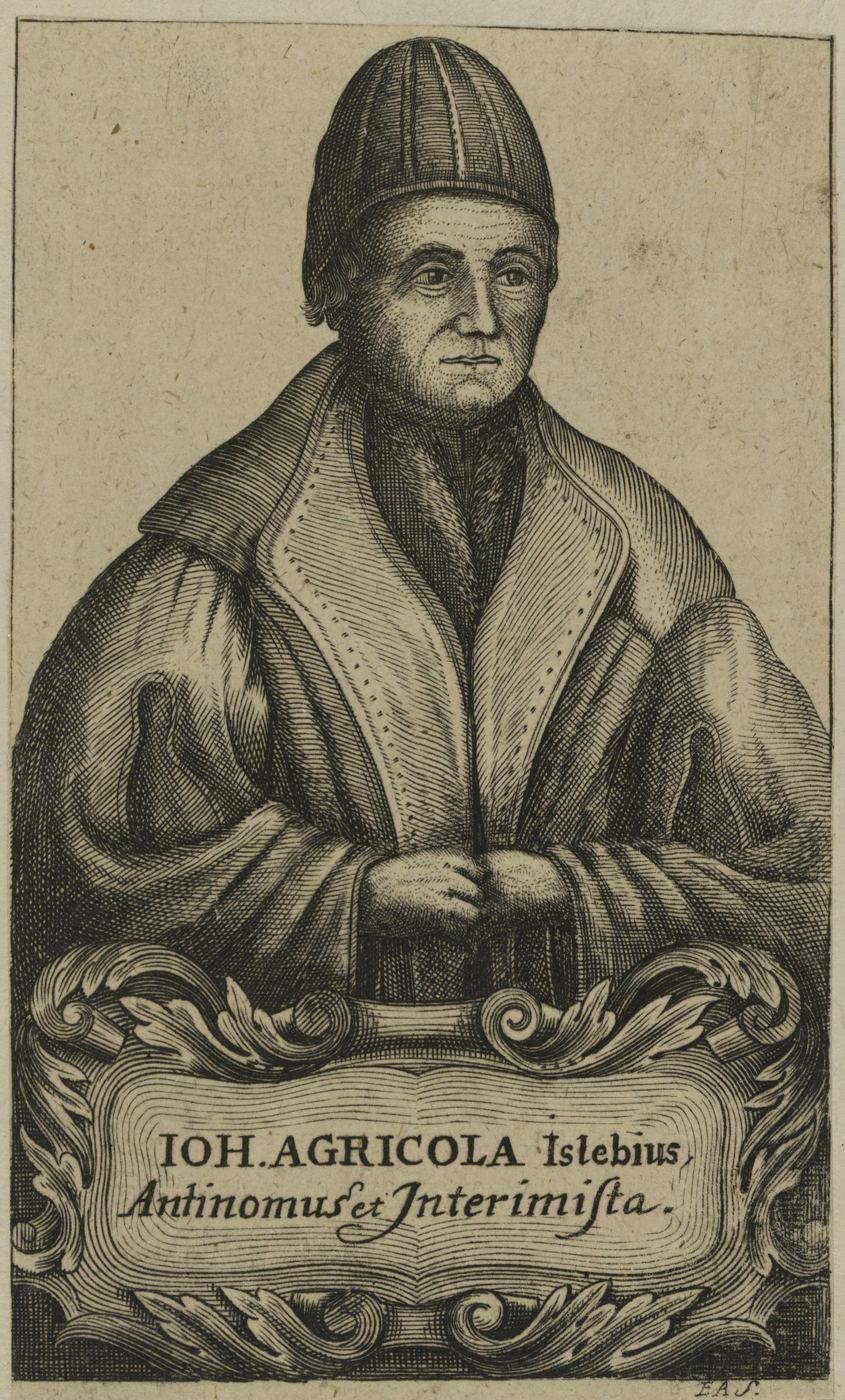
Johannes Agricola

The librettos of the church cantatas presented for the first time in Leipzig during Bach's third to fifth year in that city have a diverse origin. The most substantial group of librettos with a similar structure derives from a 1704 cycle of cantata texts printed in Meiningen, which was used for most of the cantatas presented in the liturgical year 1725–26. In 1728 many of the librettos of cantatas associated with Bach's third to fifth year in Leipzig were grouped in a single publication by Christoph Birkmann.

=== Trinity III to Trinity VII 1725 ===
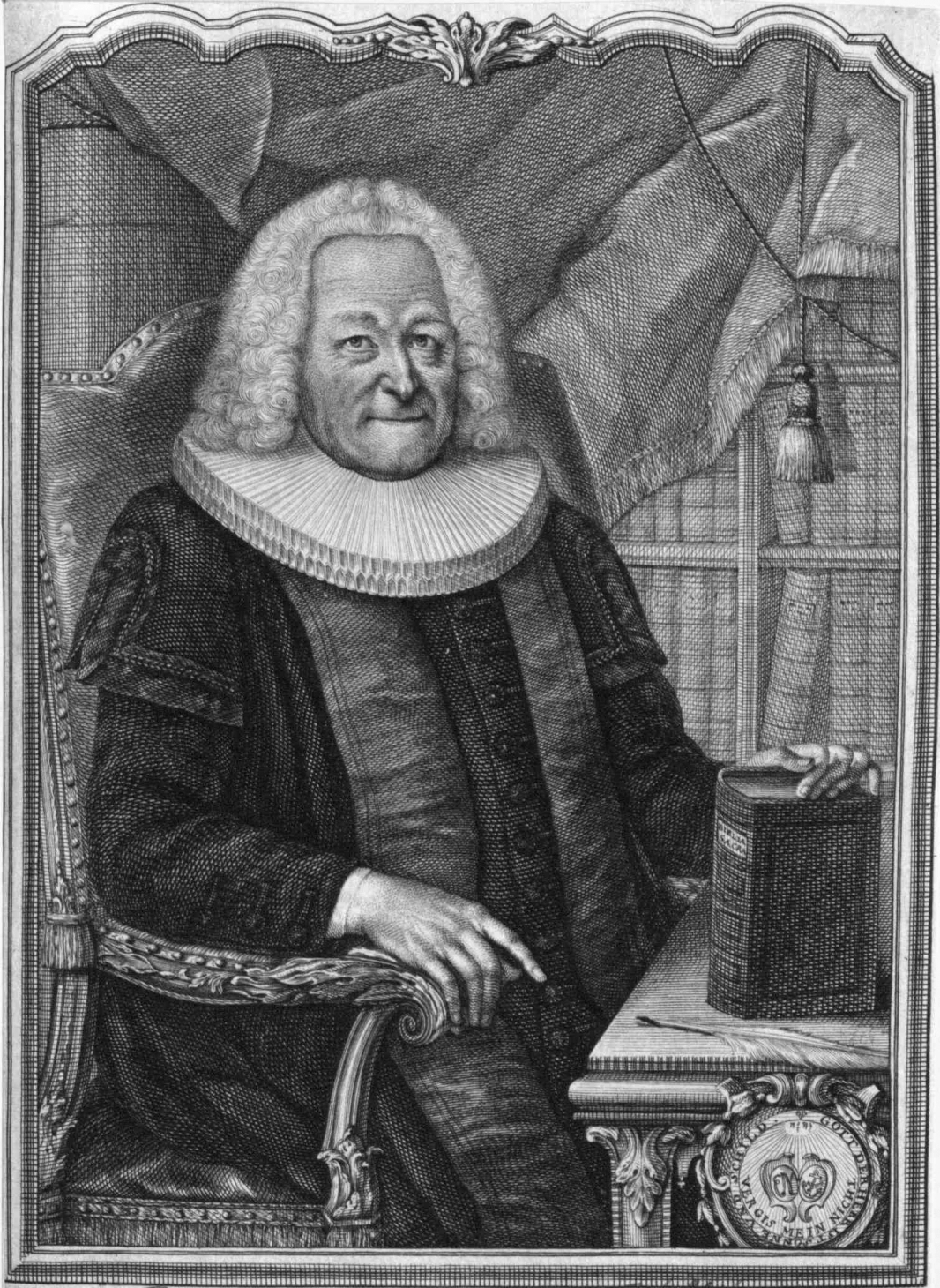
Erdmann Neumeister

A booklet printed in 1725, with the cantata texts from Trinity III to Trinity VI, was recovered in 1971. The period covered by the booklet included the feasts of St. John and Visitation:

- Trinity III, 17 June 1725: Ich ruf zu dir, Herr Jesu Christ, BDW 01669 – the text is Johannes Agricola's 16th-century hymn with the same name. In 1732 Bach composed a per omnes versus chorale cantata with exactly the same text, Ich ruf zu dir, Herr Jesu Christ, BWV 177, for Trinity IV, a cantata that was added to the chorale cantata cycle. Possibly BDW 1669 was an early version of that cantata.
- St. John's Day, 24 June 1725 (coinciding with the fourth Sunday after Trinity): Gelobet sei der Herr, BDW 01673 – a text by Erdmann Neumeister, from a libretto cycle published in 1711.
- Trinity V, 1 July 1725: Der Segen des Herrn machet reich ohne Mühe, BDW 11069 – also by Neumeister (1711 cycle).
- Feast of Visitation, 2 July 1725: Meine Seele erhebt den Herrn, BDW 01672 – Magnificat paraphrase by Maria Aurora von Königsmarck.
- Trinity VI, 8 July 1725: Wer sich rächet, an dem wird sich der Herr wieder rächen, BDW 01670 – text from Neumeister's 1711 cycle.

The musical settings of these librettos as performed in Leipzig on these days have not been recovered. A Trinity VII cantata, only known by its title, is presumed to have been the cantata for the next Sunday,

- Trinity VII, 15 July 1725: Gesegnet ist die Zuversicht, BWV Anh. 1 (?).

It is not certain Bach composed any of the cantatas from Trinity III to Trinity VII 1725. Georg Philipp Telemann has been suggested as their possible composer: he had set all cantata librettos of Neumeister's 1711 cycle, and for the Trinity VII cantata there are two known Telemann cantatas that have the same title (TWV 1:617 and 616).

=== Trinity IX to Trinity XIII 1725 ===
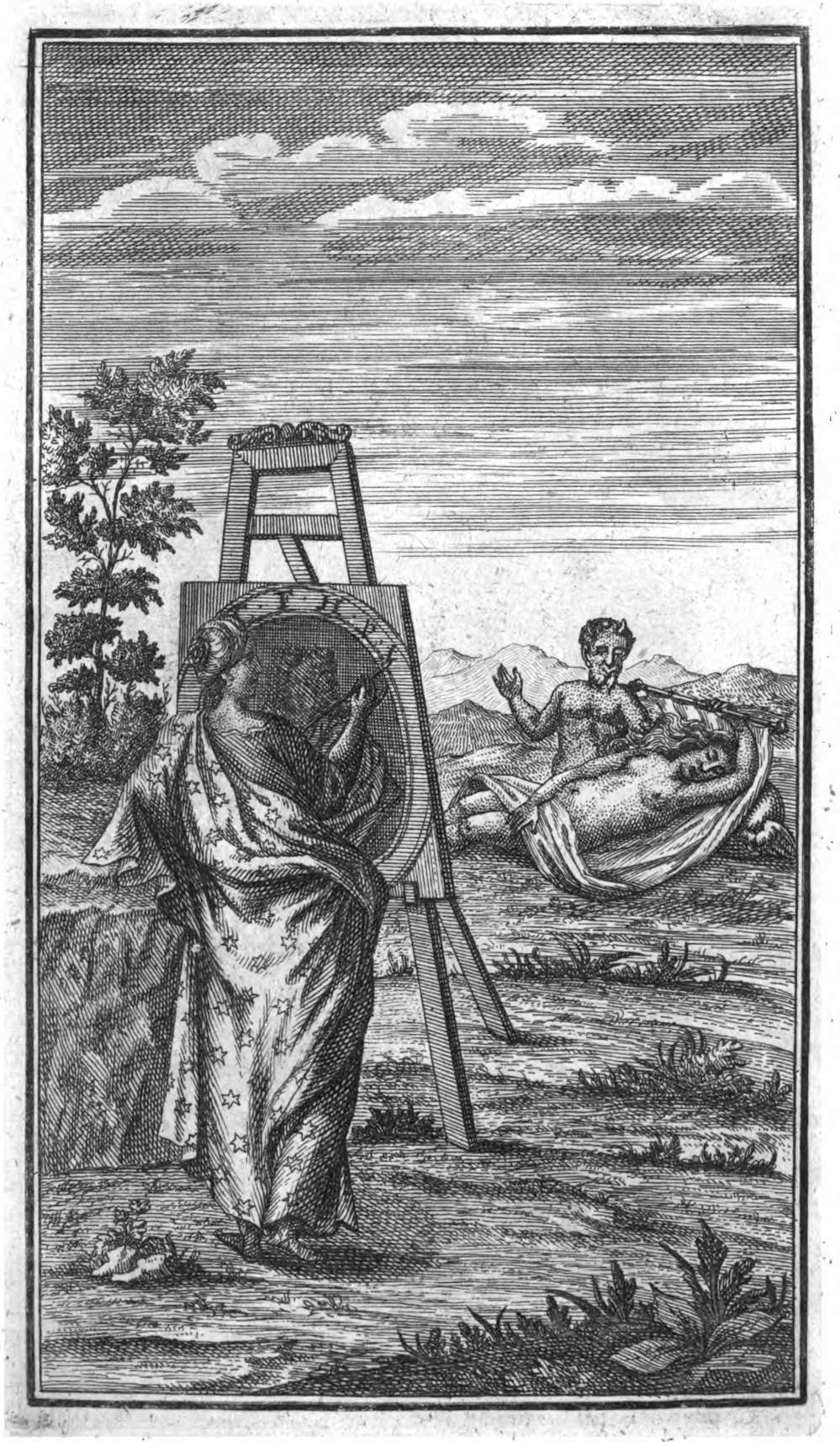
Frontispiece of Picander's Ernst-Schertzhaffte und Satyrische Gedichte, Vol. 3, published in 1732, which on pp. 108–110 contains a reprint of the reworked version of the libretto of cantata BWV 84

The ninth Sunday after Trinity is the first occasion with an extant new cantata by J. S. Bach after Trinity 1725:

- Trinity IX, 29 July 1725: Tue Rechnung! Donnerwort, BWV 168 on a libretto by Salomon Franck.

The next extant cantata is for the 12th Sunday after Trinity:

- Trinity XII, 19 August 1725: Lobe den Herren, den mächtigen König der Ehren, BWV 137, is a chorale cantata with a libretto consisting of five unmodified stanzas of a 17th-century hymn, known in English as "Praise to the Lord, the Almighty", by Joachim Neander. The cantata was added to the chorale cantata cycle (there is no other extant Trinity XII cantata in the chorale cantata format by Bach).

The next Sunday Bach sets again a text by Franck:

- Trinity XIII, 26 August 1725: Ihr, die ihr euch von Christo nennet, BWV 164, from Evangelisches Andachts-Opffer (1715).

=== Picander ===
The sacred cantata for the next occasion, Council Election (Ratswahl), does not belong to any cycle. Its libretto was published in 1725:

- Council Election, Monday 27 August 1725: Wünschet Jerusalem Glück, BWV Anh. 4, text by Picander, music lost.

In this period Bach relied on Picander for the librettos of several of his secular cantatas, but also for a few more church cantatas:

- Michaelmas, 29 September 1726: Es erhub sich ein Streit, BWV 19, text heavily reworked from Picander's 1724–25 cantata cycle.
- Funeral in Pomßen, 6 February 1727: Ich lasse dich nicht, du segnest mich denn, BWV 157, libretto published by Picander in 1727.
- Septuagesima (third Sunday before lent), 9 February 1727: Ich bin vergnügt mit meinem Glücke, BWV 84. A reworked version of the libretto of this cantata was published by Picander in his 1728–29 cantata cycle as Ich bin vergnügt mit meinem Stande, for performance on Septuagesima 13 February 1729. Bach did however not seem to have considered his 1727 Septuagesima cantata as a part of the later cycle.

Other early versions of librettos that were adopted by Picander in his 1728–29 cycle may have been set by Bach in 1727. Recent recovery of a copy of Birkmann's 1728 libretto cycle seems to suggest Welt, behalte du das Deine and Ich kann mich besser nicht versorgen for the first and the second Sunday after Easter respectively.

=== Lehms' cycle of 1711 ===
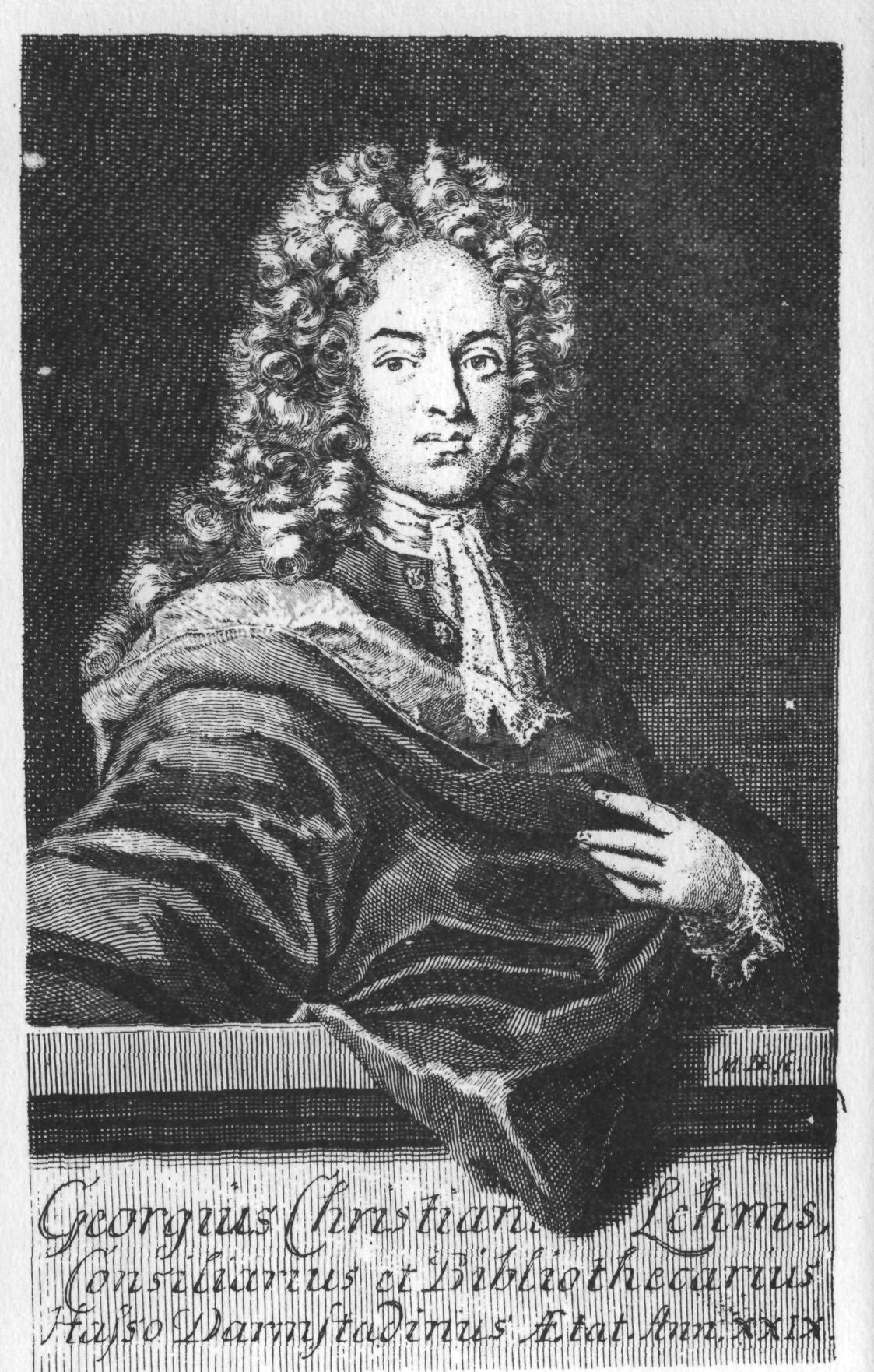
Georg Christian Lehms (1715)

A cantata with a libretto from a cycle by Georg Christian Lehms, published as Gottgefälliges Kirchen-Opffer in 1711, may have been presented on the 15th Sunday after Trinity 1725:

- Trinity XV, 9 September 1725: Liebster Gott, vergißt du mich, BWV Anh. 209? – Music lost. In Lehms' cycle the cantata text was assigned to Trinity VII. However, since Birkmann published the cantata libretto for Trinity XV, that Sunday of 1725 is the more likely date of the cantata's first performance. Later the cantata was combined with BWV 157 for a funeral cantata performed in Pomßen (6 February 1727, see above).

From Christmas 1725 to the second Sunday after Trinity 1726 Bach drew most of his cantata librettos from Lehms' 1711 libretto cycle:

- Christmas, 25 December 1725: Unser Mund sei voll Lachens, BWV 110
- Second day of Christmas, 26 December 1725: Selig ist der Mann, BWV 57, dialogue cantata
- Third day of Christmas, 27 December 1725: Süßer Trost, mein Jesus kömmt, BWV 151
- New Year, 1 January 1726: Herr Gott, dich loben wir, BWV 16
- First Sunday after Epiphany, 13 January 1726: Liebster Jesu, mein Verlangen, BWV 32, dialogue cantata
- Second Sunday after Epiphany, 20 January 1726: Meine Seufzer, meine Tränen, BWV 13

In the Post Trinitatem season of 1726 there are two further cantatas from Lehms' 1711 cycle:

- Sixth Sunday after Trinity, 28 July 1726: Vergnügte Ruh, beliebte Seelenlust, BWV 170
- Twelfth Sunday after Trinity, 8 September 1726: Geist und Seele wird verwirret, BWV 35

=== Other cantatas between Council Election 1725 and Purification 1726 ===
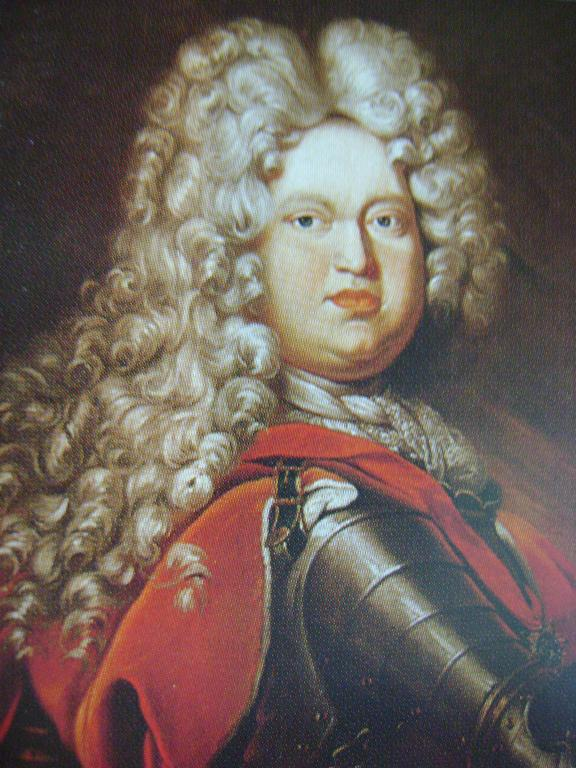
Ernst Ludwig I, Duke of Saxe-Meiningen, c.1710

Trinity XVII may have seen the performance of another cantata on a libretto by Franck:

- Trinity XVII, 23 September 1725: Seht, so ist die falsche Welt

From Council Election to the Christmas season of 1725 there is only one further cantata extant:

- Reformation Day, 31 October 1725: Gott der Herr ist Sonn und Schild, BWV 79 – librettist unknown

The cantata for the Sunday between Christmas 1725 and New Year 1726 has a libretto drawn from Erdman Neumeister's fourth cycle:

- Christmas I, 30 December 1725: Gottlob! nun geht das Jahr zu Ende, BWV 28

The cantata for the third Sunday after Epiphany 1726 has a libretto from Salomon Franck's Evangelisches Andachts=Opffer:

- Epiphany III, 27 January 1726: Alles nur nach Gottes Willen, BWV 72

=== Libretto cycle published in Meiningen ===
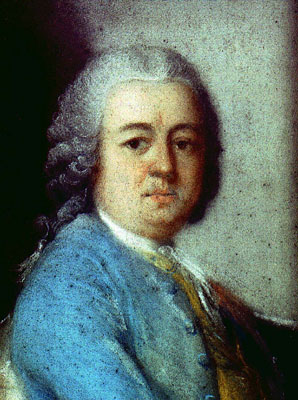
Johann Ludwig Bach

In 1704 a cycle of cantata texts was published anonymously in Meiningen, under the title Sonn- und Fest-Andachten. Its third edition appeared under the title Sonntags- Und Fest-Andachten in 1719. Bach scholars have suggested that Ernst Ludwig I, Duke of Saxe-Meiningen, Johann Ludwig Bach's employer, might have been the author of these librettos. The librettos follow a strict format, in two variants. The short form applies to most of the cantatas:

- Biblical text from the Old Testament (OT)
  - Recitative
    - Aria
      - Biblical text from the New Testament (NT)
    - Aria
  - Recitative
- Chorale: one or more stanzas from a Lutheran hymn

The build is symmetrical around the central New Testament section. The long form has a strophic poem instead of the Aria and Recitative after the New Testament section. When the cantata is split in two parts, as was customary in Leipzig, the split was usually after the third item, so that both parts started with a prose dictum (all other sections being versified). The 18 cantatas by Johann Ludwig Bach that were performed in Leipzig from Purification to Trinity XIII 1726 had a libretto from this cycle, as well as seven of the cantatas composed by Johann Sebastian Bach which were presented for the first time from Ascension to Trinity XIV 1726. Six of the extant cantatas of the latter used the short form, only the first one, for Ascension, has a libretto in the long form.

Further cantatas with a libretto from the Meiningen cycle may have been presented in Leipzig in 1726, for instance on the fourth and the ninth Sundays after Trinity. In chronological order:

- Purification, 2 February 1726: Mache dich auf, werde licht, JLB 9
- Epiphany IV, 3 February 1726: Gott ist unser Zuversicht, JLB 1
- Epiphany V, 10 February 1726: Der Gottlosen Arbeit, JLB 2
- Septuagesima, 17 February 1726: Darum will ich auch erwählen, JLB 3
- Sexagesima, 24 February 1726: Darum säet euch Gerechtigkeit, JLB 4
- Estomihi, 3 March 1726: Ja, mir hast du Arbeit gemacht, JLB 5 (OT: Isaiah 43:24–25; NT: Luke 18:31–33; Hymn text: "Herzliebster Jesu, was hast du verbrochen" by Heermann, on a melody by Crüger)
- Easter, 21 April 1726: Denn du wirst meine Seele nicht in der Hölle lassen, JLB 21 (a.k.a. BWV 15)
- Easter Monday, 22 April 1726: Er ist aus der Angst und Gericht genommen, JLB 10
- Easter Tuesday, 23 April 1726: Er machet uns lebendig, JLB 11
- Easter I, 28 April 1726: Wie lieblich sind auf den Bergen, JLB 6
- Easter II, 5 May 1726: Und ich will ihnen einen einigen Hirten, JLB 12
- Easter III, 12 May 1726: Die mit Tränen säen, JLB 8 (OT: Psalms 126:5–6; NT: Romans 8:18; Hymn: "Kommt her zu mir" by Georg Grünwald)
- Easter IV, 19 May 1726: Die Weisheit kömmt nicht, JLB 14
- Ascension, 30 May 1726: Gott fähret auf mit Jauchzen, BWV 43
- Trinity I, 23 June 1726: Brich dem Hungrigen dein Brot, BWV 39
- St. John's Day, 24 June 1726: Siehe, ich will meinen Engel senden, JLB 17
- Visitation, 2 July 1726: Der Herr wird ein Neues im Lande, JLB 13
- Trinity IV, 14 July 1726: no cantata extant – possibly a setting of Ich tue Barmherzigkeit an vielen Tausenden was presented.
- Trinity V, 21 July 1726: Siehe, ich will viel Fischer aussenden, BWV 88
- Trinity VI, 28 July 1726: Ich will meinen Geist, JLB 7
- Trinity VII, 4 August 1726: Es wartet alles auf dich, BWV 187
- Trinity VIII, 11 August 1726: Es ist dir gesagt, Mensch, was gut ist, BWV 45
- Trinity IX, 18 August 1726: no cantata extant – possibly a setting of Machet euch Freunde mit dem ungerechten Mammon was presented.
- Trinity X, 25 August 1726: Herr, deine Augen sehen nach dem Glauben, BWV 102
- Trinity XI, 1 September 1726: Durch sein Erkenntnis, JLB 15
- Trinity XIII, 15 September 1726: Ich aber ging für dir über, JLB 16
- Trinity XIV, 22 September 1726: Wer Dank opfert, der preiset mich, BWV 17

For cantatas not belonging to the Meiningen libretto cycle, performed on the sixth and twelfth Sunday after Trinity 1726, see above in the section on Lehms' cycle of 1711. J. S. Bach's cantata for Trinity VI (with Lehms' libretto) was a short solo cantata. J. L. Bach's cantata for the same day, on a Meiningen libretto, required a chorus only for its last movement. Probably this cantata wasn't split: one of the two cantatas for this Sunday in 1726 was sung as part I, and the other as part II.

=== Easter III 1726 or 1728 ===
- Easter III, 12 May 1726 or 18 April 1728: Wir müssen durch viel Trübsal, BWV 146, librettist unknown

=== Michaelmas to Trinity XVII 1726 ===
- St. Michael's Day: BWV 19 → Picander
- Trinity XVI: BWV 27 → Neumeister
- Trinity XVII: BWV 47 → Helbig

=== Birkmann cantatas ===
- Trinity XVIII: BWV 169
- Trinity XIX: BWV 56
- Trinity XX: BWV 49, dialogue cantata
- Trinity XXI: BWV 98
- Trinity XXII: BWV 55
- Trinity XXIII: BWV 52
- New Year I: BWV 58 (1727), dialogue cantata
- Purification: BWV 82 (1727)

=== Septuagesima to Pentecost Monday 1727 ===
- Septuagesima: BWV 84 (1727) → Picander
- Pentecost: BWV 34 (1727)
- Pentecost 2: BWV 173 (1727)

== Sources ==
- BWV^{2a} Bach-Werke-Verzeichnis, Breitkopf & Härtel, 1998
- NBA Neue Bach-Ausgabe, Bärenreiter, 1954 to 2007
- Z. Philip Ambrose Texts of the Complete Vocal Works with English Translation and Commentary University of Vermont 2005–2011
- Alberto Basso. Frau Musika: La vita e le opere di J. S. Bach, Volume 2: Lipsia e le opere de la maturità (1723–1750). Turin: EDT, 1983. ISBN 88-7063-028-5
- Walter F. Bischof. The Bach Cantatas University of Alberta 2003–2010
- Christine Blanken. "A Cantata-Text Cycle of 1728 from Nuremberg: a Preliminary Report on a Discovery relating to J. S. Bach's so-called 'Third Annual Cantata Cycle'", pp. 9–30 in Understanding Bach, Vol. 10, 2015.
- Malcolm Boyd. Bach. Oxford University Press, 2006. ISBN 9780195307719
- Alfred Dürr: Johann Sebastian Bach: Die Kantaten. Bärenreiter, Kassel 1999, ISBN 3-7618-1476-3 (in German)
- Alfred Dürr: The Cantatas of J.S. Bach, Oxford University Press, 2006. ISBN 0-19-929776-2
- Alfred Dürr; Richard D. P. Jones (6 July 2006). The Cantatas of J. S. Bach: With Their Librettos in German-English Parallel Text. OUP Oxford. ISBN 978-0-19-929776-4.
- Richard D. P. Jones (October 2013). The Creative Development of Johann Sebastian Bach, Volume II: 1717-1750: Music to Delight the Spirit. OUP Oxford. ISBN 978-0-19-969628-4.
- Werner Neumann: Handbuch der Kantaten J.S.Bachs, 1947, 5th ed. 1984, ISBN 3-7651-0054-4
- Martin Petzold: Bach-Kommentar. Theologisch-musikwissenschaftliche Kommentierung der geistlichen Vokalwerke Johann Sebastian Bachs.
  - Vol. I: Die geistlichen Kantaten des 1. bis 27. Trinitatis-Sonntages, Kassel/Stuttgart 2004
  - Vol. II: Die geistlichen Kantaten vom 1. Advent bis zum Trinitatisfest, Kassel/Stuttgart 2007
  - [Vol. III: Passionen, Messen, Motetten, Fest- und Kasualkantaten. Bärenreiter 2017. ISBN 978-3761817438]
- Hans-Joachim Schulze: Die Bach-Kantaten: Einführungen zu sämtlichen Kantaten Johann Sebastian Bachs Leipzig: Evangelische Verlags-Anstalt; Stuttgart: Carus-Verlag 2006 (Edition Bach-Archiv Leipzig) ISBN 3-374-02390-8 (EVA), ISBN 3-89948-073-2 (in German)
- Tatiana Shabalina "Recent Discoveries in St Petersburg and their Meaning for the Understanding of Bach’s Cantatas" pp. 77–99 in Understanding Bach 4, 2009
- Christoph Wolff: Johann Sebastian Bach: The Learned Musician. W. W. Norton & Company, 2001. ISBN 9780393075953
- Christoph Wolff/Ton Koopman: Die Welt der Bach-Kantaten Verlag J.B. Metzler, Stuttgart, Weimar 2006 ISBN 978-3-476-02127-4 (in German)
- Günther Zedler. Die Kantaten von Johann Sebastian Bach: Eine Einführung in die Werkgattung. Books on Demand, 2011. ISBN 9783842357259
- Philippe and Gérard Zwang. Guide pratique des cantates de Bach. Second revised and augmented edition. L'Harmattan, 2005. ISBN 9782296426078

Church cantatas by Johann Sebastian Bach by chronology
Preceded by Bach's second cantata cycle	Church cantatas of Bach's third to fifth year in Leipzig; 1725–28	Succeeded by Bach's fourth cantata cycle
