= Ich geh und suche mit Verlangen, BWV 49 =

Church cantata by Johann Sebastian Bach

Ich geh und suche mit Verlangen
- BWV 49
- Church cantata by J. S. Bach
- Title page of the manuscript cover of the score
- Occasion: 20th Sunday after Trinity
- Cantata text: Christoph Birkmann
- Chorale: Wie schön leuchtet der Morgenstern
- Performed: 3 November 1726: Leipzig
- Movements: 6
- Vocal: soprano and bass soloists
- Instrumental: oboe d'amore; 2 violins; viola; violoncello piccolo; organ; continuo

Johann Sebastian Bach composed the church cantata Ich geh und suche mit Verlangen (I go forth and seek with longing), BWV 49, in Leipzig for the twentieth Sunday after Trinity Sunday and first performed it on 3 November 1726. It is a solo cantata, a dialogue for soprano and bass.

Bach composed the cantata in his fourth year as Thomaskantor (director of church music) in Leipzig. The librettist, Christoph Birkmann, based his text on the prescribed Gospel passage, the parable of the great banquet. He focused on the theme of a wedding feast, taking imagery from the love poetry of the Song of Songs, which has traditionally been interpreted as a dialogue between Jesus and the Soul as his bride. In the cantata, Jesus, sung by the bass as the vox Christi, is in dialogue with the Soul, inviting her as his bride to the wedding.

The cantata is structured in six movements, beginning with an instrumental sinfonia. The soloists perform alternating arias and dialogue recitatives. In the last movement, a stanza from Nicolai's "Wie schön leuchtet der Morgenstern" is integrated into the dialogue. The Baroque instrumental ensemble is formed by oboe d'amore, violoncello piccolo, strings, organ and basso continuo. The Bach scholar Klaus Hofmann summarises: "Bach has clothed his music in the 'wedding garments' of exquisite scoring".

== History ==
=== Background ===
Bach was appointed Thomaskantor (director of church music) in 1723 in Leipzig. There he was responsible for the music at four churches, and the training and education of the boys singing in the Thomanerchor (the boys' choir in Leipzig). He took office on 30 May 1723, performing his church cantata Die Elenden sollen essen, BWV 75, for the first Sunday after Trinity. In the new position, Bach decided to compose church cantatas for almost all liturgical events during the first twelve months; they became his first cantata cycle. The cantatas covered Sundays and feast days of the liturgical year, including feasts of saints, especially of Mary, and the multi-day observances of the high holidays. They did not cover the "silent times" of Advent (before Christmas) and Lent (before Easter), when no cantata music was performed in Leipzig. The following year, Bach went on to write a second cantata cycle, now basing each on a Lutheran hymn. In his book Johann Sebastian Bach: The Learned Musician, Christoph Wolff described the endeavour as "a most promising project of great homogeneity, whose scope he was able to define himself".

In 1725, his third year in the post, Bach slowed down his composing and began to perform cantatas by other composers. Until Christmas, cantatas from that year survive for only four occasions: three Sundays and Reformation Day on 31 October.

In 1726, his fourth year, Bach marked again the First Sunday after Trinity with a substantial work, Brich dem Hungrigen dein Brot, BWV 39. He went on to compose more cantatas for Sundays after Trinity, Ich geh und suche mit Verlangen being one of them.

=== Occasion and readings ===
Bach composed Ich geh und suche mit Verlangen in his fourth year in Leipzig for the 20th Sunday after Trinity. It is counted as part of his third cantata cycle. The prescribed readings for the Sunday were from the Epistle to the Ephesians, "walk circumspectly ... filled with the Spirit" (Ephesians 5:15–21), and from the Gospel of Matthew, the parable of the great banquet (Matthew 22:1–14). The German term used in Luther's Bible translation is Hochzeitsmahl (wedding meal). The topic features in both cantatas that Bach composed previously for the same occasion: Ach! ich sehe, itzt, da ich zur Hochzeit gehe, BWV 162 and the chorale cantata Schmücke dich, o liebe Seele, BWV 180.

Bach termed the cantata a "Dialogus". Dialogue cantatas were common in 17th century, especially between Jesus as the Bridegroom and the Soul of the believer as the Bride, based on the Song of Songs which was traditionally interpreted that way.

=== Libretto ===
The librettist was unknown to earlier scholars such as Alfred Dürr and Klaus Hofmann, but was identified in 2015 by Christine Blanken as Christoph Birkmann. Birkmann studied theology at the University of Leipzig from 1724 to 1727 and was musically interested. He attended Bach's performances regularly and was the author of six cantatas before the Advent season of 1726, including Ich will den Kreuzstab gerne tragen, BWV 56, composed for the previous week.

Birkmann connected the wedding feast of the Gospel to imagery from the Song of Songs: Jesus, sung by the bass as the vox Christi, invites the bride to the wedding; the other characters and aspects of the parable are not mentioned. The poet alludes to the Bible several times, comparing the bride to a dove as in Song of Songs 5:2 and Song of Songs 6:9, referring to the Lord's feast (Isaiah 25:6), to the bond between the Lord and Israel (Hosea 2:21), to faithfulness until death (Revelation 2:10), and in the final movement to "Yea, I have loved thee with an everlasting love: therefore with loving kindness have I drawn thee." (Jeremiah 31:3). Instead of a closing chorale, Bach combines this idea, sung by the bass, with the seventh stanza of Philipp Nicolai's mystical wedding song "Wie schön leuchtet der Morgenstern", given to the soprano.

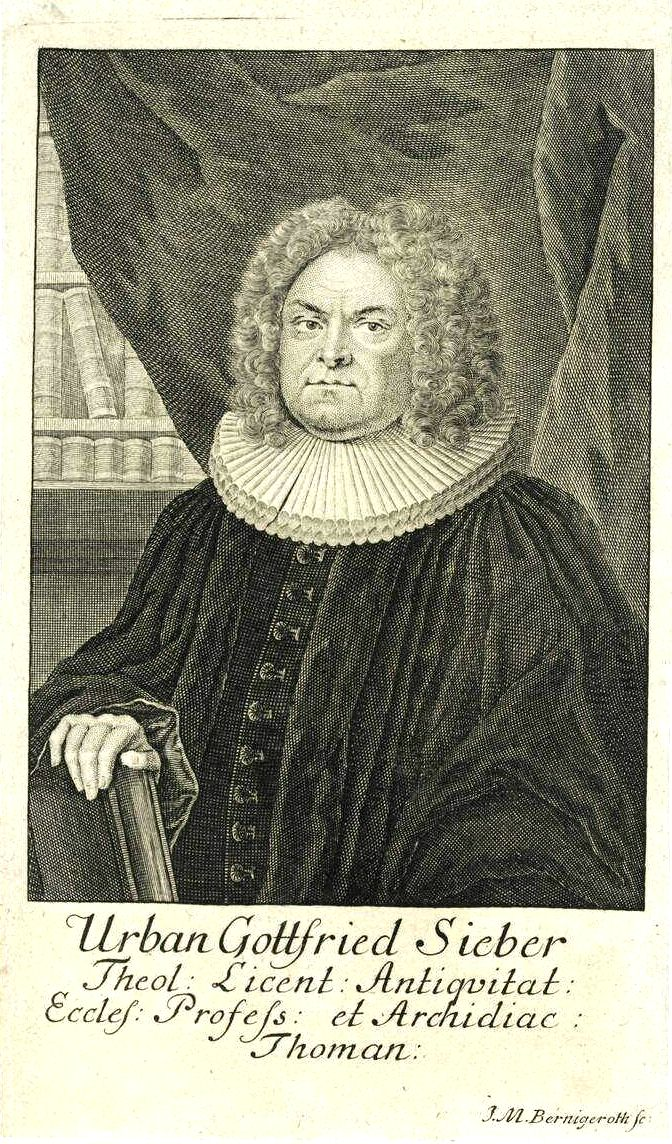
Urban Gottfried Sieber, a pastor in Leipzig

=== Performance ===
Bach led the first performance of the cantata at the Thomaskirche on 3 November 1726. The sermon was given by Urban Gottfried Sieber. Bach probably played the organ part from the score. No repeat performance is known with certainty.

== Music ==
=== Structure and scoring ===
Bach structured Ich geh und suche mit Verlangen in six movements and scored it for soprano (S) and bass (B) soloists, and a Baroque instrumental ensemble of oboe d'amore (Oa), violoncello piccolo (Vcp), organ (Org), two violins (Vl), viola (Va) and basso continuo (Bc). Dürr gave the duration as c. 29 minutes in his book Die Kantaten von Johann Sebastian Bach.

In the following table of the movements, the scoring is based on the Neue Bach-Ausgabe. The keys and time signatures are taken from Dürr, using the symbol for common time (4/4). The continuo, playing throughout, is not listed.

Movements of Ich geh und suche mit Verlangen
No.	Title	Text	Type	Vocal	Winds	Strings	Key	Time
1			Sinfonia		Oa Org	2Vl Va	E major	3/8
2	Ich geh und suche mit Verlangen	Birkmann	Aria	B	Org		C minor	3/8
3	Mein Mahl ist zubereit'	Birkmann	Recitative	S B		2Vl Va	A major	/ 3/8
4	Ich bin herrlich, ich bin schön	Birkmann	Aria	S	Oa	Vcp	A major	common time
5	Mein Glaube hat mich selbst so angezogen	Birkmann	Recitative	S B				common time
6	Dich hab ich je und je geliebet Wie bin ich doch so herzlich froh	Birkmann; Nicolai	Recitative chorale	B S	Oa Org	2Vl Va	E major	2/4

=== Movements ===
==== 1 ====
The cantata is opened by a sinfonia for concertante organ and orchestra, probably the final movement of a lost concerto composed in Köthen for an unknown solo melody instrument such as flute, oboe, oboe d'amore or viola. It also became the model for the Concerto II in E major, BWV 1053, for harpsichord. Two weeks before, Bach had used the two other movements of that concerto in his cantata Gott soll allein mein Herze haben, BWV 169.

==== 2 ====
The bass as the vox Christi sings an aria, "Ich geh und suche mit Verlangen dich, meine Taube, schönste Braut" (I go forth and seek with longing for you, my dove, my loveliest bride) based on imagery from the Song of Songs as if spoken by Jesus. The organ adds embellished music to the aria. The voice and the organ have their own themes, illustrating distance. The bride is illustrated by triplets, while, as Felix Loy, the publisher of a critical edition, noted, the voice features "yearning chromatism", and the organ has wide leaps.

==== 3 ====
In a secco recitative, "Mein Mahl ist zubereit' und meine Hochzeittafel fertig" (My meal is prepared and my wedding table is ready) the groom invites the bride to the prepared wedding, and they talk about kisses, the meal and dressing up. After a short recitative, the principal motif from the previous aria is quoted in an arioso, after which the voices begin to unite as a duet.

==== 4 ====
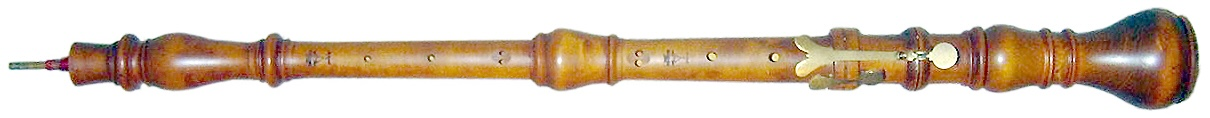
Baroque oboe d'amore

In the soprano aria "Ich bin herrlich, ich bin schön" (I am glorious, I am beautiful) the bride reflects on her beauty as if looking in a mirror and contemplates herself as clothed in "seines Heils Gerechtigkeit" (The justice of His salvation), accompanied by oboe d'amore and violoncello piccolo. It is not known with certainty which kind of small cello Bach had in mind; several existed at the time, some played like the violin, others held between the legs.

==== 5 ====
In a recitative accompanied by strings, "Mein Glaube hat mich selbst so angezogen" (My faith itself has drawn me here), the bride speaks of her faith, and the groom speaks of faithfulness until death.

==== 6 ====
The cantata ends not with the usual four-part chorale, but with a love duet of the Soul (soprano) and Jesus (bass). It incorporates a chorale, stanza 7 of Nicolai's hymn sung by the soprano, ending with the line "Deiner wart ich mit Verlangen" (I wait for Thee with longing), while the bass responds: "I have always loved you, and so I draw you to me. I'm coming soon. I stand before the door: open up, my abode!", following (Revelation 3:20). Nicolai subtitled his hymn a "Geistlich Brautlied" (Spiritual bridal song).

Wie bin ich doch so herzlich froh,
Daß mein Schatz ist das A und O,
Der Anfang und das Ende.
Er wird mich doch zu seinem Preis
Aufnehmen in das Paradeis;
Des klopf ich in die Hände.
Amen! Amen!
Komm, du schöne Freudenkrone, bleib nicht lange!
Deiner wart ich mit Verlangen.

How glad I am from the bottom of my heart
that my beloved is the alpha and omega,
the beginning and the end.
To praise him, he will
receive me in paradise;
to that I clap my hands.
Amen! Amen!
Come, you crown of joys, do not delay!
You I await with longing.

John Eliot Gardiner describes the mood of the music, accompanied by the obbligato organ, as "religious-erotic". Hofmann notes that the movement serves as the "final duet, final chorale and organ concerto movement", with the figuration of the organ expressing in sound what the cantus firmus states: "Wie bin ich doch so herzlich froh!" (How sincerely happy I am!)

== Manuscripts and publication ==
The manuscripts of both the score and the parts survive, possibly revised by Bach. There is no extra part for the organ in the set of parts.

The first critical edition of the cantata, edited by Wilhelm Rust, was published by the Bach Gesellschaft in 1860 as part of its complete edition of Bach's works. In the Neue Bach-Ausgabe, the second edition of Bach's works, the cantata was published in 1997, edited by Ulrich Bartels.

Carus published a critical edition in German and English as part of its Stuttgarter Bach-Ausgaben in 2012, edited by Felix Loy. In the 21st century, Bach Digital published high-resolution facsimile images of the manuscript parts from the first quarter of the 18th century.

== Recordings ==
The selection is taken from the listing provided by the Bach Cantatas Website. In the following table, ensembles playing on period instruments in historically informed performance are marked by a green background under the header Instr..

Recordings of Ich geh und suche mit Verlangen
Title	Conductor / Choir / Orchestra	Soloists	Label	Year	Instr.
J. S. Bach: Cantatas BWV 49 & BWV 84	Wilhelm Ehmann Westfälische Kantorei	Agnes Giebel; Jakob Stämpfli	Nonesuch Records	1961	
J. S. Bach: Das Kantatenwerk Vol. 14	Nikolaus Harnoncourt Concentus Musicus Wien	Peter Jelosits (soloist of the Wiener Sängerknaben); Ruud van der Meer	Teldec	1975	Period
Die Bach Kantate	Helmuth Rilling Bach-Collegium Stuttgart	Arleen Augér; Philippe Huttenlocher	Hänssler	1982	
J. S. Bach: Cantatas BWV 82 · 49 · 58	Sigiswald Kuijken La Petite Bande	Nancy Argenta; Klaus Mertens	Accent Records	1993	Period
J. S. Bach: Cantatas with Violoncelle Piccolo	Christophe Coin Ensemble Baroque de Limoges	Barbara Schlick; Gotthold Schwarz	Auvidis Astrée	1993	Period
Bach Edition Vol. 15 – Cantatas Vol. 8	Pieter Jan Leusink Netherlands Bach Collegium	Ruth Holton; Bas Ramselaar	Brilliant Classics	2000	Period
Bach Cantatas Vol. 11: Genova/Greenwich	John Eliot Gardiner English Baroque Soloists	Magdalena Kožená; Peter Harvey	Soli Deo Gloria	2000	Period
J. S. Bach: Complete Cantatas Vol. 16	Ton Koopman Amsterdam Baroque Orchestra	Sibylla Rubens; Klaus Mertens	Antoine Marchand	2001	Period
J. S. Bach Cantatas BWV 149, 145, 174, 49	Masaaki Suzuki Bach Collegium Japan	Hana Blažíková; Peter Kooy	BIS	2011	Period
Ich geh und suche mit Verlangen, BWV 49	Rudolf Lutz Orchestra of the J. S. Bach-Stiftung	Nuria Rial; Sebastian Noack	J. S. Bach-Stiftung	2017	Period
Bach: Cantata Ich geh und suche mit Verlangen BWV 49	Shunske Sato Nederlandse Bachvereniging	Dorothee Mields; Stephan MacLeod	All of Bach	2021	Period
