= Falsche Welt, dir trau ich nicht, BWV 52 =

Church cantata by Johann Sebastian Bach

Falsche Welt, dir trau ich nicht
- BWV 52
- Church cantata by J. S. Bach
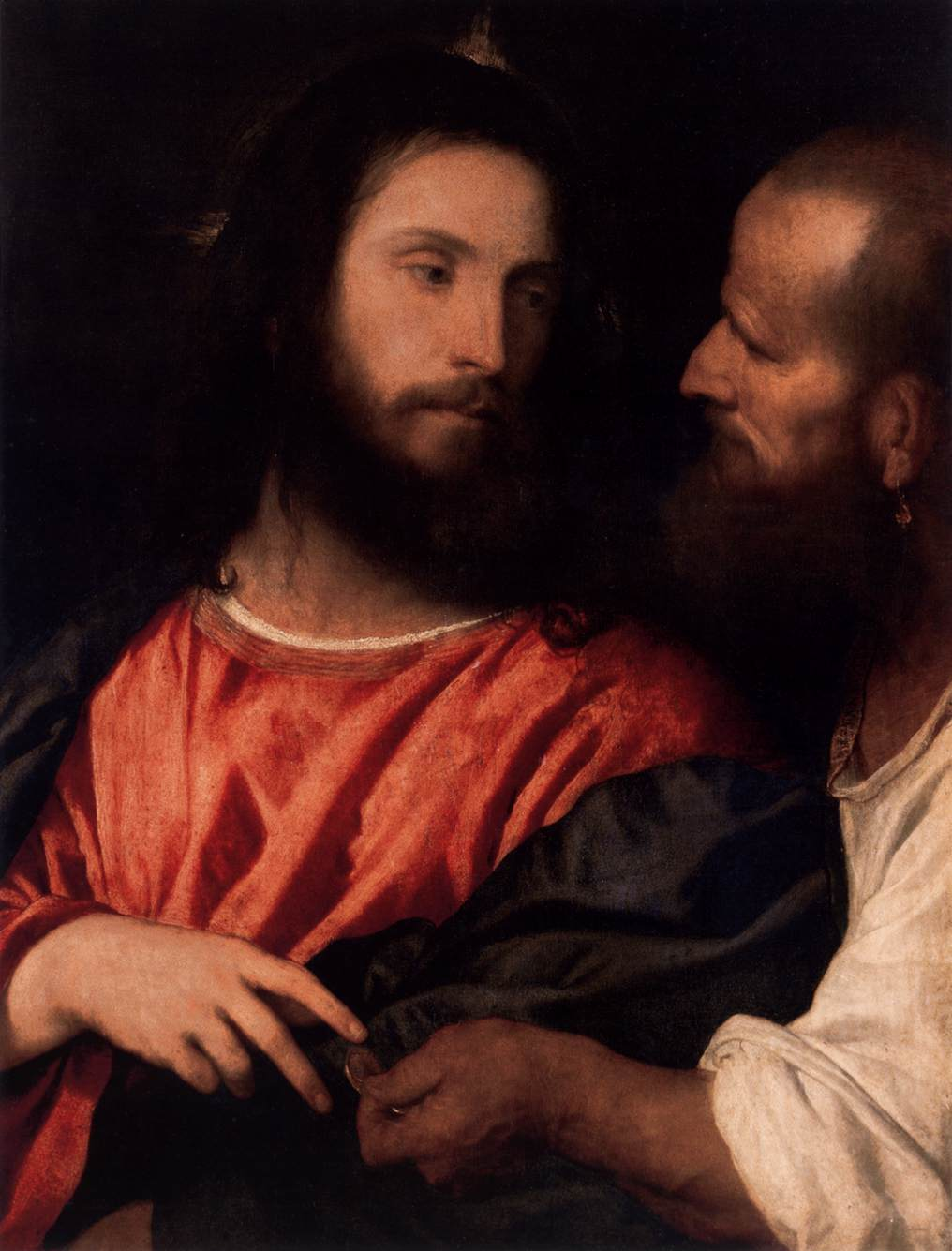
- The Tribute Money by Titian
- Occasion: 23rd Sunday after Trinity
- Cantata text: Christoph Birkmann
- Chorale: "In dich hab ich gehoffet, Herr"
- Performed: 24 November 1726: Leipzig
- Movements: 6
- Vocal: soprano solo; SATB choir
- Instrumental: 2 horns; 3 oboes; bassoon; 2 violins; viola; continuo

Johann Sebastian Bach composed the church cantata Falsche Welt, dir trau ich nicht (False world, I trust you not), BWV 52, (Note: "BWV" is Bach-Werke-Verzeichnis, a thematic catalogue of Bach's works.) in Leipzig for the 23rd Sunday after Trinity. He led the first performance of the solo cantata for soprano on 24 November 1726.

Bach composed the cantata in his fourth year as Thomaskantor (director of church music) in Leipzig. The text was written by Christoph Birkmann, who derived it from the prescribed Gospel of the day, the question about paying taxes, answered by "Render unto Caesar...". The composition is a solo cantata for soprano and is structured in six movements. An opening Sinfonia, a movement from an early version of a Brandenburg Concerto, is followed by alternating recitatives and arias and a closing chorale, setting the first stanza of Adam Reusner's "In dich hab ich gehoffet, Herr". The voice is accompanied by a colourful Baroque instrumental ensemble of two horns, three oboes, bassoon, strings and basso continuo.

== History and words ==
Bach composed the cantata in 1726, in Leipzig, for a solo soprano singer, for the 23rd Sunday after Trinity, which fell on 24 November. The cantata is regarded as part of Bach's third cantata cycle. The cantata closed the liturgical year in 1726, as Easter fell late that year. The cantata is the last in a series of solo cantatas which Bach had begun nearly four months prior, with Vergnügte Ruh, beliebte Seelenlust, BWV 170, first performed on 28 July 1726; it was preceded the previous Sunday by Ich armer Mensch, ich Sündenknecht, BWV 55, a solo cantata for tenor.

The prescribed readings for the Sunday were from the Epistle to the Philippians, "our conversation is in heaven" (Philippians 3:17–21), and from the Gospel of Matthew, the question about paying taxes, answered by "Render unto Caesar..." (Matthew 22:15–22). The librettist, Christoph Birkmann, took from the Gospel the idea that the world is false and that man should concentrate on God. He referred to the murder of Abner by Joab, described in 2 Samuel 3:27, as an example of the world's falseness.

The librettist's contribution is in whole similar to that of Wohl dem, der sich auf seinen Gott, BWV 139, illustrating the idea of Christians being surrounded by enemies, often operating under false pretenses of friendliness, such as the Pharisees, who sought to trap Jesus with the question of taxes. This is contrasted to the faithfulness of God. The closing chorale is the first stanza of Adam Reusner's "In dich hab ich gehoffet, Herr", published in 1533. It expresses the sentiment of invoking God's faithfulness as protection from evil.

Bach led the first performance on 24 November 1726. There is no evidence of a repeat performance in Bach's lifetime.

== Music ==
=== Structure and scoring ===
Bach structured the cantata in six movements and scored it for a soprano soloist, employing a four-part choir only for the final chorale, and a rich instrumental ensemble of two horns (Co), three oboes (Ob), bassoon (Fg), two violins (Vl), viola (Va), and basso continuo. The cantata begins with an orchestral sinfonia, followed by two contrasting recitative-aria pairs and a closing chorale.

In the following table, the scoring is based on the Neue Bach-Ausgabe. The keys and time signatures are taken from Alfred Dürr's book Die Kantaten von Johann Sebastian Bach, using the symbol for common time. Dürr notes a duration of 18 minutes. The continuo, played throughout, is not listed.

Movements of Falsche Welt, dir trau ich nicht
| No. | Title | Text | Type | Vocal | Winds | Strings | Key | Time |
|---|---|---|---|---|---|---|---|---|
| 1 | Sinfonia | | | | 2Co 3Ob Fg | 2Vl Va | F major | common time |
| 2 | Falsche Welt, dir trau ich nicht | Birkmann | Recitative | S | | | | common time |
| 3 | Immerhin, immerhin, wenn ich gleich verstoßen bin | Birkmann | Aria | S | | 2Vl | D minor | common time |
| 4 | Gott ist getreu | Birkmann | Recitative | S | | | | common time |
| 5 | Ich halt es mit dem lieben Gott | Birkmann | Aria | S | 3Ob | | B-flat major | 3/4 |
| 6 | In dich hab ich gehoffet, Herr | Reusner | Chorale | SATB | 2Co 3Ob | 2Vl Va | F major | common time |

=== Movements ===
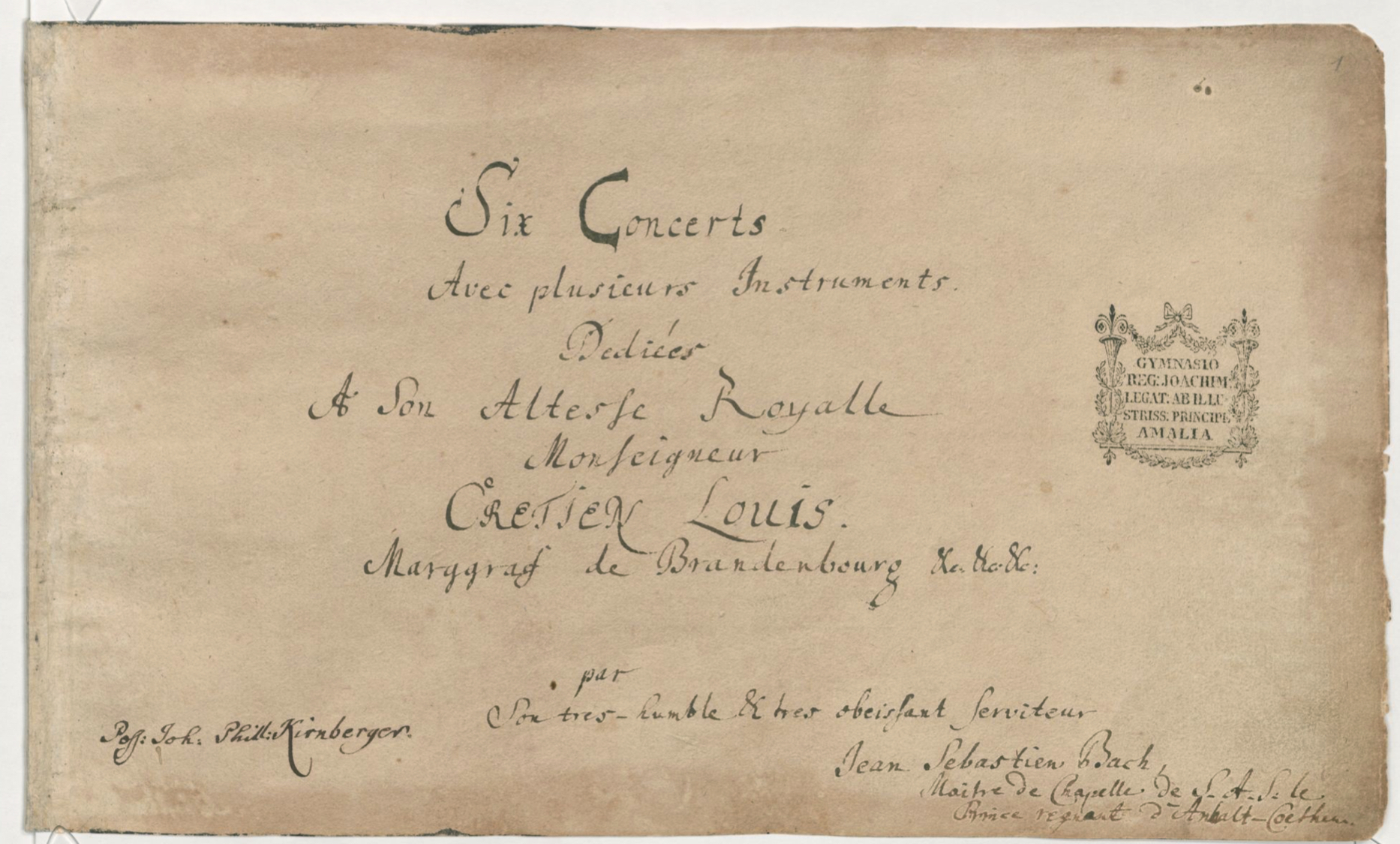
Title page of the Brandenburg Concertos, 1721

The cantata is set for just one singer, but the instrumentation is rich. The cantata begins with an orchestral sinfonia. In two contrasting recitative-aria pairs, the first one describes the world's wickedness, the second God's fidelity. A varied instrumentation provides colourful contrast to the lone soloist and to the text's relative simplicity.

==== 1 ====
As in several other cantatas of the later Leipzig period, Bach used an instrumental movement from an earlier period as a sinfonia, here the opening of the first Brandenburg Concerto in an early version, similar to the Sinfonia BWV 1046a (without a violino piccolo). It is dominated by horns and oboes. John Eliot raised the question if perhaps the "whooping hunting horns" may have been intended to represent the "false" world.

==== 2 ====
The soprano enters in a secco recitative, "Falsche Welt, dir trau ich nicht" (False world, I don't trust you!).

==== 3 ====
In the first aria, "Immerhin, immerhin, wenn ich gleich verstoßen bin" (It's all the same, it's all the same, even if I am repudiated), the soprano is accompanied by two violins, that play sometimes in unison, and sometimes in parallel thirds. The first section is dominated by short injections, expressing disdain for the world full of atrocities. In the middle section the vocal lines, expressing the imagination of God's friendly face, turns to elaborate coloraturas, while the instruments keep playing the motifs from the beginning.

==== 4 ====
In the second secco recitative, "Gott ist getreu!" (God is faithful!), the voice expresses trust in God's faithfulness, in melodious phrases almost like in an arioso.

==== 5 ====
In the second aria, "Ich halt es mit dem lieben Gott" (I keep faith with the loving God,), has dance character in a triple metre, with periodic vocal lines. The voice is accompanied by three oboes. Dürr notes the aria's relaxed mood that he sees as an expression of the ease coming with knowing oneself "secure in God". John Eliot Gardiner, who conducted the Bach Cantata Pilgrimage in 2000, likens the aria's sonority to a "saxophone trio, smooth and euphonious".

==== 6 ====
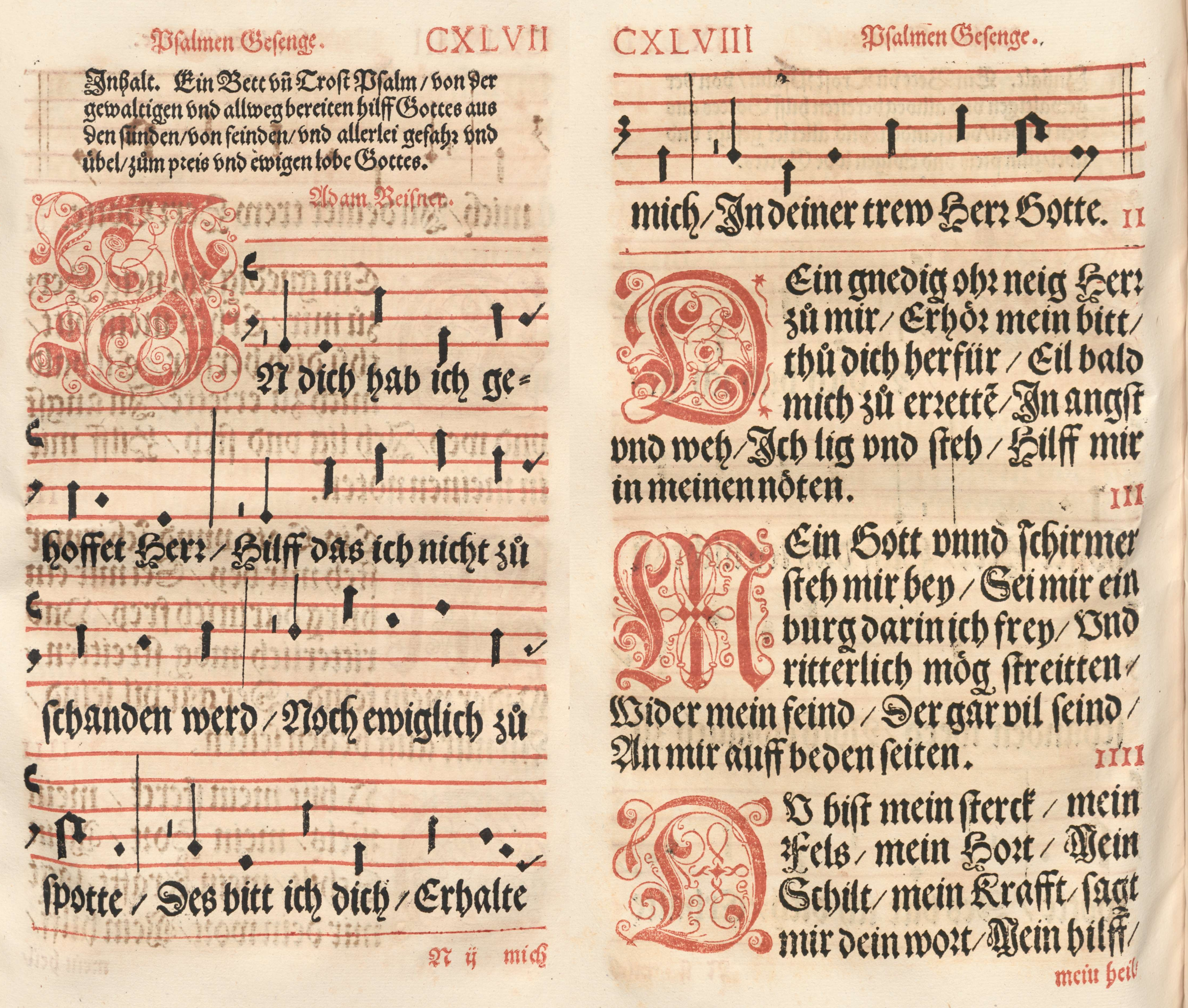
The hymn in the first print, Strasbourg, 1560

The closing chorale, "In dich hab ich gehoffet, Herr" (I have put my hope in you, Lord), the two horns from the Sinfonia return for partly independent music: the first horn supports the soprano, and the second horn plays a fifth part.

== Manuscripts and publication ==
The manuscripts of both the score and the parts survive, the parts being an exact copy of the score. They are held by the Berlin State Library. The first critical edition of the cantata, edited by Wilhelm Rust, was published by the Bach Gesellschaft in 1863 as part of its complete edition of Bach's works. In the Neue Bach-Ausgabe, the second edition of Bach's works, the cantata was published in 1994, edited by Andreas Glöckner.

Carus published a critical edition in German and English as part of its Stuttgarter Bach-Ausgaben in 2011, edited by Felix Loy. In the 21st century, Bach Digital published high-resolution facsimile images of the manuscript parts from the first quarter of the 18th century.

== Recordings ==
The following table is a selection from the Bach Cantatas website, where 27 recordings are listed as of 2026. Instrumental groups playing period instruments in historically informed performances are marked by green background under the header "Instr.".

Recordings of Falsche Welt, dir trau ich nicht
| Title | Conductor / Choir / Orchestra | Soloists | Label | Year | Instr. |
|---|---|---|---|---|---|
| J. S. Bach: Das Kantatenwerk • Complete Cantatas • Les Cantates, Folge / Vol. 3 | Gustav Leonhardt Knabenchor Hannover Leonhardt-Consort | boy soprano | Teldec | 1976 | Period |
| Die Bach Kantate Vol. 59 | Helmuth Rilling Gächinger Kantorei Bach-Collegium Stuttgart | Arleen Augér | Hänssler | 1983 | |
| Bach: Kantaten BWV 52, BWV 84 & BWV 209 | Raymond Leppard English Chamber Orchestra | Elly Ameling | Philips | 1981 | Period |
| Bach Edition Vol. 19 – Cantatas Vol. 10 | Pieter Jan Leusink Holland Boys Choir Netherlands Bach Collegium | Ruth Holton | Brilliant Classics | 2000 | Period |
| Bach Cantatas Vol. 12 | John Eliot Gardiner Monteverdi Choir English Baroque Soloists | Gillian Keith | Soli Deo Gloria | 2000 | Period |
| J. S. Bach: Complete Cantatas Vol. 18 | Ton Koopman Amsterdam Baroque Orchestra & Choir | Sibylla Rubens | Antoine Marchand | 2003 | Period |
| J. S. Bach: Cantatas Vol. 38 | Masaaki Suzuki Bach Collegium Japan | Carolyn Sampson | BIS | 2006 | Period |
| J. S. Bach: Geistliche Solokantaten für Sopran | Helmut Müller-Brühl Bach Vokalensemble Köln Kölner Kammerorchester | Siri Thornhill | Naxos | 2007 | Period |
| J. S. Bach: Kantate BWV 52 "Falsche Welt, dir trau ich nicht" | Rudolf Lutz Schola Seconda Pratica | Miriam Feuersinger | Gallus Media | 2014 | Period |

== Sources ==
- Falsche Welt, dir trau ich nicht, BWV 52: Scores at the International Music Score Library Project
- BWV 52 Falsche Welt, dir trau ich nicht: English translation, University of Vermont
- BWV 52 Falsche Welt, dir trau ich nicht: text, scoring, University of Alberta
- Chapter 33 Bwv 52 – The Cantatas of Johann Sebastian Bach Julian Mincham, 2010
- BWV 52.6 bach-chorales.com
