= Anarg zu Wildenfels =

- Born: c. 1490; Wildenfels
- Died: 1539 (aged 48–49)
- Other name: Anarg von Wildenfels zu Schönkirchen und Ronneburg
- Occupations: Court administrator; Protestant reformer; Hymnwriter

Anarg Heinrich zu Wildenfels (c. 1490 – 1539), also named Anarg von Wildenfels zu Schönkirchen und Ronneburg, was a court administrator, Protestant reformer, and hymnwriter. He was instrumental in introducing the Reformation in Saxony.

== Life ==
Zu Wildenfels was born in Wildenfels, the son of Anarg von Wildenfels who accompanied Frederick III, Elector of Saxony, on his pilgrimage to Holy Land. Frederick is supposed to have been the godfather of the boy, and later made him ruler of Ronneburg (today in Thuringia). In 1521 or 1522, zu Wildenfels married countess Elisabeth von Gleichen. He was interested in Martin Luther's ideas and kept copies of his sermons. In 1527, he was the moderator in the dispute about religion "Das Düsseldorfer Religionsgespräch" in Düsseldorf between the Franciscan Johann Heller from Korbach and the Lutheran Friedrich Myconius.

He died in Altenburg. He is probably buried in Drei Marien, Härtensdorf, where epitaphs are extant for him and his son and grandson.

== Work ==
His hymn "O Herre Gott, dein göttlich Wort" was used in Bach's cantata for Pentecost, Erwünschtes Freudenlicht, BWV 184, and still appears in a regional German hymnal.
