= Liebster Jesu, mein Verlangen, BWV 32 =

Church cantata by Johann Sebastian Bach

Liebster Jesu, mein Verlangen
- BWV 32
- Dialogue church cantata by J. S. Bach
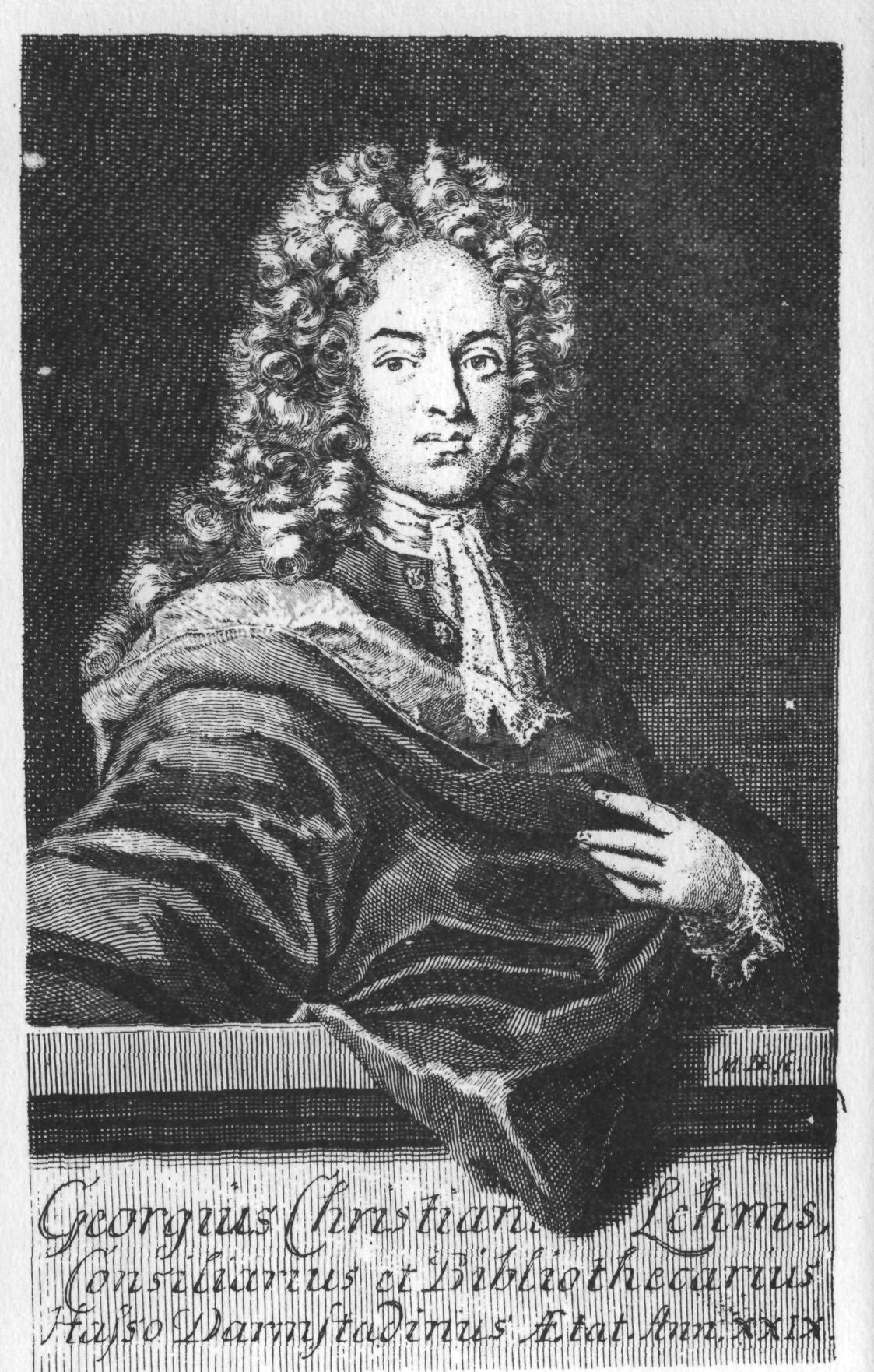
- Lehms, the librettist
- Occasion: First Sunday after Epiphany
- Cantata text: Georg Christian Lehms
- Chorale: "Weg, mein Herz, mit den Gedanken" by Paul Gerhardt
- Performed: 13 January 1726: Leipzig
- Movements: 6
- Vocal: soprano and bass solo; SATB choir
- Instrumental: oboe; 2 violins; viola; continuo

Liebster Jesu, mein Verlangen (Dearest Jesus, my desire), BWV 32, (Note: "BWV" is Bach-Werke-Verzeichnis, a thematic catalogue of Bach's works.) is a church cantata by Johann Sebastian Bach. He composed the dialogue cantata (Concerto in Dialogo) in Leipzig for the first Sunday after Epiphany and first performed it on 13 January 1726 as part of his third cantata cycle.

Bach composed the cantata in his third year as Thomaskantor on a text which Georg Christian Lehms, a court poet in Darmstadt, had published already in 1711. Lehms derived from the prescribed gospel, the finding in the Temple, a dialogue. Instead of a parent missing a son, as in the gospel, an allegorical Soul (soprano) misses Jesus (bass). The motifs of the story, the loss and anxious search, are placed in a more general situation in which the listener can identify with the Soul. As Lehms did not provide a closing chorale, Bach chose the twelfth and final stanza of Paul Gerhardt's hymn "Weg, mein Herz, mit den Gedanken".

Bach structured the cantata in six movements, first alternating arias and recitative, then uniting the voices in recitative and aria, finally a chorale. The two soloists are supported by an intimate Baroque instrumental ensemble of oboe, strings and continuo. The oboe accompanies the soprano, a solo violin the bass, both play when the voices are united.

== History and words ==
Bach composed the cantata in his third year as Thomaskantor (director of church music) in Leipzig for the First Sunday after Epiphany. The prescribed readings for the Sunday were taken from the Epistle to the Romans, speaking of the duties of a Christian (Romans 12:1–6), and from the Gospel of Luke, the finding in the Temple (Luke 2:41–52). Bach composed a text written by Georg Christian Lehms, court poet in Darmstadt, who published it in 1711. Bach had set texts by Lehms already when he composed cantatas for the Weimar court from 1714 to 1717. In the 1725/26 Christmas season, he had used mostly librettos by Lehms.

Lehms treated the Gospel to an allegorical dialogue of Jesus and the Soul. In the Concerto in Dialogo (Concerto in dialogue), Lehms imagined not a parent searching for a missing son, but more generally the Christian Soul "with whom we are expected to identify", as John Eliot Gardiner notes. Bach assigned the Soul to the soprano voice and gave the words of Jesus to the bass as the vox Christi, the voice of Christ, disregarding that the Jesus in the Gospel is still a boy. The Bach scholar Klaus Hofmann comments that the poet "takes up the general motifs of the story: the loss, the search for Jesus and his rediscovery, and places them in the context of the believer’s relationship with Jesus". The dialogue also refers to medieval mysticism and to imagery of the Song of Songs. Lehms did not provide a closing chorale; Bach added the twelfth and final stanza of Paul Gerhardt's hymn "Weg, mein Herz, mit den Gedanken" (1647). It is sung to the melody of "Freu dich sehr, o meine Seele", which was codified by Louis Bourgeois when setting the Geneva Psalm 42 in his collection of Pseaumes octante trios de David (Geneva, 1551). Bourgeois seems to have been influenced by the secular song Ne l'oseray je dire contained in the Manuscrit de Bayeux published around 1510.

Bach led the Thomanerchor in the first performance of the cantata on 13 January 1726 as part of his third cantata cycle.

== Music ==
=== Structure and scoring ===
Bach structured the cantata in six movements, four movements of alternating arias and recitatives, then the voices united in a duet and finally a closing chorale. He scored the intimate dialogue for soprano and bass soloist, a four-part choir only in the chorale, and a Baroque instrumental ensemble of oboe (Ob), two violins (Vl), viola (Va) and basso continuo. The duration is given as 22 minutes.

In the following table of the movements, the scoring follows the Neue Bach-Ausgabe. The keys and time signatures are taken from the book on all cantatas by the Bach scholar Alfred Dürr, using the symbols for common time (4/4) and alla breve (2/2). The continuo, playing throughout, is not shown.

Movements of Liebster Jesu, mein Verlangen
| No. | Title | Text | Type | Vocal | Winds | Strings | Key | Time |
|---|---|---|---|---|---|---|---|---|
| 1 | Liebster Jesu, mein Verlangen | Lehms | Aria | S | Ob | 2Vl Va | E minor | |
| 2 | Was ist's, daß du mich gesuchet | Lehms | Recitative | B | | | B minor | common time |
| 3 | Hier, in meines Vaters Stätte | Lehms | Aria | B | | Vl solo | G major | |
| 4 | Ach! heiliger und großer Gott | Lehms | Recitative | S B | | 2Vl Va | | |
| 5 | Nun verschwinden alle Plagen | Lehms | Aria (Duet) | S B | Ob | 2Vl Va | D major | |
| 6 | Mein Gott, öffne mir die Pforten | Gerhardt | Chorale | SATB | Ob | 2Vl Va | G major | common time |

=== Movements ===
The dialogue, set in arias and recitatives for a solo voice and in duets, shows that Bach was familiar with Italian contemporary opera.

==== 1 ====
The dialogue is opened by the soprano as the Soul in an aria in E minor, marked lento, "Liebster Jesu, mein Verlangen" (Dearest Jesus, my desire), The voice is complemented by an obbligato oboe, described by John Eliot Gardiner as "a solo oboe as her accomplice in spinning the most ravishing cantilena in the manner of one of Bach’s concerto slow movements". Julian Mincham distinguishes in the oboe line two different "ideas", in the first five measures a "sense of striving, effort and stretching upwards", then "garlands" of content in achieving a union, as the last lines of the text say "Ach! mein Hort, erfreue mich, laß dich höchst vergnügt umfangen" (Ah! My treasure, bring me joy, let me embrace You with greatest delight).

==== 2 ====
The bass answers in a short recitative, "Was ists, daß du mich gesuchet?" (How is it, that you sought Me?), a paraphrase of Jesus saying in the gospel that he has to be in his Father's place.

==== 3 ====
He expands the reasoning in a da capo aria in B minor, "Hier, in meines Vaters Stätte" (Here, in My Father's place). embellished by a solo violin, which "encircles the voice with triplets and trills". The words "betrübter Geist (troubled spirit) appear whenever mentioned in "minor-mode colourings in the melody and harmony".

==== 4 ====
In the following dialogue recitative, "Ach! heiliger und großer Gott" (Ah! Holy and great God), the soul answers with a paraphrase of the opening line of Psalm 84, "Wie lieblich ist doch deine Wohnung" (How amiable is Thy dwelling), which both Heinrich Schütz and Johannes Brahms set to music, Brahms as the central movement of Ein deutsches Requiem. Bach sets the text as an "evocative arioso with a pulsating string accompaniment". The two voices never sing at the same time.

==== 5 ====
A duet, "Nun verschwinden alle PlagenLiebster Jesu, mein Verlangen, BWV 32" (Now all trouble disappears), finally unites both voices and also their "associated obbligato instruments (oboe and violin), so far heard only separately". Gardiner writes: "It is one of those duets … in which he seems to throw caution to the winds, rivalling the lieto fine conclusions to the operas of his day, but with far more skill, substance and even panache".

==== 6 ====
A four-part setting of Paul Gerhardt's hymn, "Mein Gott, öffne mir die Pforten" (My God, open the gates), "returns the cantata – also in terms of style – to the sphere of reverence appropriate for a church service".

== Recordings ==
The entries are taken from the listing on the Bach Cantatas Website. Instrumental groups playing period instruments in historically informed performances are marked green under the header Instr..

Recordings of Liebster Jesu, mein Verlangen, BWV 32
| Title | Conductor / Choir / Orchestra | Soloists | Label | Year | Instr. |
|---|---|---|---|---|---|
| J. S. Bach: Cantatas No. 140, No. 32 | Hermann Scherchen Wiener Akademie Kammerchor Orchestra of the Vienna State Opera | Magda László; Alfred Poell | Westminster / Archipel | 1952 | |
| Les Grandes Cantates de J. S. Bach Vol. 13 | Fritz Werner Heinrich-Schütz-Chor Heilbronn Pforzheim Chamber Orchestra | Agnes Giebel; Barry McDaniel | Erato | 1963 | |
| J. S. Bach: Cantatas BWV 32 & BWV 39 | Wolfgang Gönnenwein Süddeutscher Madrigalchor Consortium Musicum | Edith Mathis; Franz Crass | EMI | 1965 | |
| Bach: 13 Sacred Cantatas & 13 Sinfonias | Helmut Winschermann Deutsche Bachsolisten and choir | Ileana Cotrubaș; Hermann Prey | Philips | 1970 | |
| J. S. Bach: Das Kantatenwerk • Complete Cantatas • Les Cantates, Folge / Vol. 9 – BWV 31–34 | Gustav Leonhardt Knabenchor Hannover Leonhardt-Consort | Soloist of the Knabenchor Hannover; Max van Egmond | Teldec | 1974 | Period |
| Die Bach Kantate Vol. 22 | Helmuth Rilling Gächinger Kantorei Bach-Collegium Stuttgart | Arleen Augér; Walter Heldwein | Hänssler | 1981 | |
| Bach Cantatas Vol. 18: Weimar/Leipzig/Hamburg / For Christmas Day & for Epiphany / For the 1st Sunday after Epiphany | John Eliot Gardiner Monteverdi Choir English Baroque Soloists | Claron McFadden; Peter Harvey | Soli Deo Gloria | 2000 | Period |
| Bach Edition Vol. 18 – Cantatas Vol. 9 | Pieter Jan Leusink Holland Boys Choir Netherlands Bach Collegium | Ruth Holton; Bas Ramselaar | Brilliant Classics | 2000 | Period |
| J. S. Bach: Complete Cantatas Vol. 17 | Ton Koopman Amsterdam Baroque Orchestra & Choir | Johannette Zomer; Klaus Mertens | Antoine Marchand | 2002 | Period |
| J. S. Bach: Cantatas Vol. 42 – BWV 13, 16, 32, 72 | Masaaki Suzuki Bach Collegium Japan | Rachel Nicholls; Peter Kooy | BIS | 2008 | Period |
| J. S. Bach Kantaten | Bernhard Forck Members of Berliner Philharmoniker | Christine Schäfer; Peter Kooy | IPPNW-Concerts | 2004 | |
| J. S. Bach: Dialog-Cantatas – BWV 32, 57, 58 | Alfredo Bernardini Kirchheimer BachConsort | Hana Blažíková; Dominik Wörner | cpo | 2016 | Period |
