= Erwünschtes Freudenlicht, BWV 184 =

Church cantata by Johann Sebastian Bach

Erwünschtes Freudenlicht
- BWV 184
- Church cantata by J. S. Bach
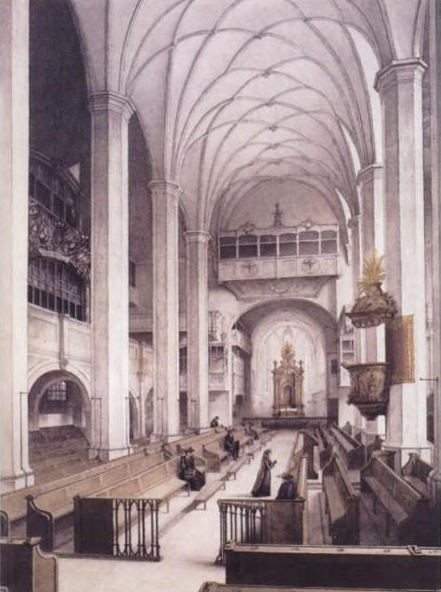
- Thomaskirche, Leipzig
- Occasion: Third day of Pentecost
- Performed: 30 May 1724: Leipzig

Erwünschtes Freudenlicht (Desired light of joy), BWV 184, is a cantata by Johann Sebastian Bach for the Lutheran church service. He composed it in Leipzig for the third day of Pentecost (Whit Tuesday) and first performed it on 30 May 1724. It was probably based on an earlier secular cantata (BWV 184a). This work, mostly lost, was composed in Köthen as a duet cantata for soprano and bass with several dance movements.

Bach structured the Pentecost cantata in six movements and scored it for three solo voices, a four-part choir and Baroque instrumental ensemble of two flutes, strings and continuo. Unusually for Bach's church cantatas, the work is not concluded by a chorale: a setting of the final stanza of the hymn "O Herre Gott, dein göttlichs Wort" by Anarg zu Wildenfels is instead in the penultimate position, followed by a chorus. The dance influence from the secular model is reflected in the passepied-like second movement, the minuet of the fourth, and the gavotte of the last.

== History and text ==
Bach composed this cantata for Pentecost Tuesday, the third day of Pentecost. It was likely based on an earlier secular cantata for New Year's Day composed in Köthen (BWV 184a). The musicologist Szymon Paczkowski suggests two other possible occasions for the secular model: the birthday of Prince Leopold of Anhalt-Coethen on 10 December 1720, and the wedding of the prince and Friderica Henrietta on 11 December 1721.

The Bach scholar Alfred Dürr points out many similarities to Erhöhtes Fleisch und Blut, BWV 173: both were adapted from secular models, both written for Pentecost in Bach's first year in Leipzig, and both revived in 1731. While the model for the other cantata survived (the congratulatory cantata Durchlauchtster Leopold, BWV 173a), the model for Erwünschtes Freudenlicht is mostly lost, with only a few instrumental parts extant. It was a duet cantata, with several dance movements.

The prescribed readings for the feast day were from the Acts of the Apostles, the Holy Spirit in Samaria (Acts 8:14–17), and from the Gospel of John, the Good Shepherd (John 10:1–10). The poet who adapted a text to the existing music is unknown. He possibly kept the wording of the beginning of the opening recitative, continuing to describe Jesus as the shepherd of his "blissful flock". The librettist included as the penultimate movement of the cantata the final (eighth) stanza of the hymn "O Herre Gott, dein göttlichs Wort" by Anarg zu Wildenfels.

Bach first performed Erwünschtes Freudenlicht in Leipzig on 30 May 1724, as a rough adaption of BWV 184a. He performed it there again on 3 June 1727 and 15 May 1731.

== Music ==
=== Scoring and structure ===
Bach scored the work for three vocal soloists (soprano (S), alto (A) and tenor (T)), a four-part choir, and a Baroque instrumental ensemble: two transverse flutes (Ft), two violins (Vl), viola (Va), and basso continuo. The duration of the piece has been stated as 25 minutes.

Bach structured the cantata in six movements. A chorale movement, which ends most of his cantatas originally conceived for church use, is here penultimate movement, followed by the only chorus. The first movements are for the soloists: recitatives, a duet and an aria. In the following table of the movements, the scoring follows the Neue Bach-Ausgabe. The keys and time signatures are taken from the book by Bach scholar Alfred Dürr, using the symbols for common time (4/4) and alla breve (2/2). The instruments are shown according to type (winds and strings), while the continuo, playing throughout, is not shown.

Movements of Erwünschtes Freudenlicht
No.	Title	Text	Type	Vocal	Winds	Strings	Key	Time
1	Erwünschtes Freudenlicht	anon.	Recitative	T	2Ft		G major	common time
2	Gesegnete Christen, glückselige Herde	anon.	Duet aria	S A	2Ft	2Vl Va	G major	3/8
3	So freuet euch, ihr auserwählten Seelen	anon.	Recitative	T				common time
4	Glück und Segen sind bereit	anon.	Aria	T		Vl solo	B minor	3/4
5	Herr, ich hoff je, du werdest die	von Wildenfels	Chorale	SATB	2Ft	2Vl Va	D major	common time
6	Guter Hirte, Trost der Deinen	anon.	Chorus	SATB	2Ft	2Vl Va	G major	cut time

=== Movements ===
==== 1 ====
The opening recitative, "Erwünschtes Freudenlicht" (Desired light of joy), is accompagnato, sung by the tenor and accompanied by two flutes. It was possibly not changed from the original cantata for New Year's Day. The "desired light" is illustrated by a rising motif in the flutes which is repeated throughout the movement. Dürr interprets the figure as the flames mentioned in the Pentecost narration. The movement concludes with an arioso section.

==== 2 ====
The duet aria is written for soprano and alto voice: "Gesegnete Christen, glückselige Herde, kommt, stellt euch bei Jesu mit Dankbarkeit ein!" (Blessed Christians, enraptured flock, come, dwell with Jesus with thankfulness!). It is a da capo aria in triple time with long ritornello episodes. The musicologist Julian Mincham describes it as "retaining a little more of the spirit of the rustic dance". The Bach scholar Klaus Hofmann called it a passepied. The movement was probably already a pastorale in the secular model, and suits the image of the Good Shepherd and his flock. John Eliot Gardiner, who conducted the Bach Cantata Pilgrimage in 2000, believes that the music was actually danced to in the secular version heard in Köthen.

==== 3 ====
The third movement is a secco tenor recitative: "So freuet euch, ihr auserwählten Seelen!" (So rejoice, you chosen souls!). It also closes as an arioso, ending the movement in D major rather than the C major in which it began.

==== 4 ====
The fourth movement is a tenor aria: "Glück und Segen sind bereit, die geweihte Schar zu krönen" (Happiness and blessing are prepared to crown the consecrated flock). Paczkowski notes that the movement's text deals with the second coming of Christ, using the symbolism of Shepherd and King, common in the Near East. It is formally a trio sonata for voice, solo violin and continuo, in adapted ternary form. It is in B minor, the only movement not in a major key. Gardiner describes it as a minuet.

==== 5 ====
The penultimate movement is a four-part setting of a chorale stanza: "Herr, ich hoff je, du werdest die in keiner Not verlassen" (Lord, I hope that you will not leave in any distress). This is unusual for Bach, as typically his church cantatas place the chorale as the final movement.

==== 6 ====
The closing chorus, "Guter Hirte, Trost der Deinen, laß uns nur dein heilig Wort!" (Good Shepherd, solace of Your followers, leave us Your holy Word alone!), is a gavotte, basically a duet of soprano and bass, expanded by the choir in the refrains. Bach reused the music of this movement to conclude Laßt uns sorgen, laßt uns wachen, BWV 213, composed for the birthday of Crown Prince Friedrich Christian of Saxony on 5 September 1733.

== Recordings ==
- Gächinger Kantorei / Bach-Collegium Stuttgart, Helmuth Rilling. Die Bach Kantate. Hänssler, 1977.
- Knabenchor Hannover & Collegium Vocale Gent, Gustav Leonhardt. J. S. Bach: Das Kantatenwerk · Complete Cantatas / Vol. 42, Teldec, 1987.
- Amsterdam Baroque Orchestra & Choir, Ton Koopman. J.S. Bach: Complete Cantatas Vol. 7. Erato, 1997.
- Holland Boys Choir / Netherlands Bach Collegium, Pieter Jan Leusink. Bach Edition Vol. 14. Brilliant Classics, 2000.
- Monteverdi Choir / English Baroque Soloists, John Eliot Gardiner. Bach Cantatas Vol. 27. Soli Deo Gloria, 2000.
- Bach Collegium Japan, Masaaki Suzuki. J.S. Bach: Cantatas Vol. 20. BIS, 2001.

== Bibliography ==
- Dürr, Alfred; Jones, Richard D.P. (2006). The Cantatas of J. S. Bach: With Their Librettos in German-English Parallel Text. Oxford University Press. pp. 364–368. ISBN 978-0-19-929776-4.
- Paczkowski, Szymon (2017). Polish Style in the Music of Johann Sebastian Bach. Rowman & Littlefield. pp. 364–368. ISBN 978-0-8108-8894-4.
