= Süßer Trost, mein Jesus kömmt, BWV 151 =

Church cantata by Johann Sebastian Bach

Süßer Trost, mein Jesus kömmt
- BWV 151
- Christmas cantata by J. S. Bach
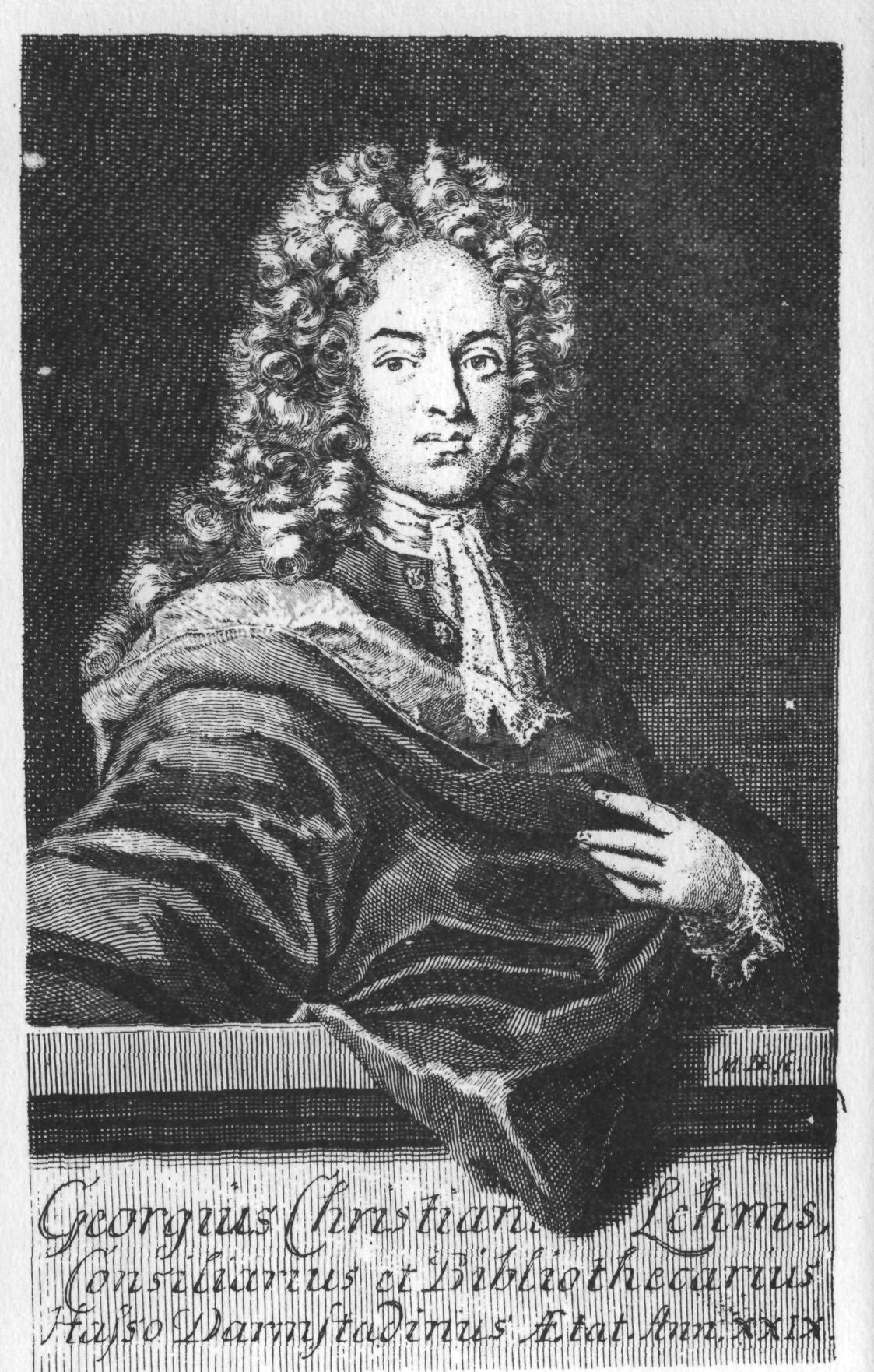
- Georg Christian Lehms, the author of the cantata text
- Occasion: Third Day of Christmas
- Performed: 27 December 1725: Leipzig

Süßer Trost, mein Jesus kömmt (Sweet comfort, my Jesus comes), BWV 151, is a church cantata by Johann Sebastian Bach. He composed it in Leipzig for the third day of Christmas, in a cycle of works for the Christmas season mainly to texts by Georg Christian Lehms; he first performed it on 27 December 1725.

== History and text ==
Bach composed this solo cantata in late 1725 in Leipzig, in his third year as Thomaskantor in Leipzig, as part of his third cantata cycle. He wrote it for the church service for the feast day of John the Evangelist, celebrated on the Third Day of Christmas. The Thomanerchor was used only for the final movement, as with other Bach works for a third consecutive feast day.

The prescribed readings for the feast day were from the Epistle to the Hebrews (Hebrews 1:1–14) and the prologue of the Gospel of John, also called Hymn to the Word (John 1:1–14). Bach chose a text by Georg Christian Lehms, who was inspired by the epistle. The final movement is a setting of the final stanza of "Lobt Gott, ihr Christen alle gleich", a Christmas carol with words and melody by Nikolaus Herman published in 1560.

Bach first performed the cantata on 27 December 1725. It was performed again between 1728 and 1731. The autograph score and parts are now held by the Kunstsammlungen der Veste Coburg in Germany.

== Scoring and structure ==
The work is scored for four vocal soloists (soprano, alto, tenor, and bass), a four-part choir, flute, oboe d'amore, two violins, viola, and basso continuo.

The cantata has five movements:

1. Aria (soprano): Süßer Trost, mein Jesus kömmt
2. Recitative (bass): Erfreue dich, mein Herz
3. Aria (alto): In Jesu Demut kann ich Trost
4. Recitative (tenor): Du teurer Gottessohn
5. Chorale: Heut schleußt er wieder auf die Tür

== Music ==
Because of its intimate scoring and lack of large-scale opening chorus, the work is a "treasureable miniature" and "the most personal of Bach's Christmas cantatas".

The opening aria begins with a lullaby-like molto adagio in 12/8 time. This movement "dominates and casts a glow over the entire work", with its "mood of iridescent transparency". It is in G major and is accompanied by obbligato flute and strings doubled by oboe d'amore. The flute line is highly embellished, almost an arabesque, and expands on the melodic arches of the soprano. The da capo aria includes a sharply contrasting middle section, "an ecstatic alla breve dance of joy, part gavotte, part gigue", built on a motif of "agile chains of triplets" forming a "mellifluous melody". The opening section then recurs to conclude the movement. John Eliot Gardiner suggests that this movement includes "music pre-echoes of both Gluck and Brahms" and "something authentically Levantine or even Basque in origin". Craig Smith notes that this is "the closest Bach gets to South German rococo architecture. One can almost see the putti and gold sunbursts of the many churches from this era in Bavaria and Austria".

The second movement is a secco bass recitative. It provides a dual transition, both harmonically – moving from a major key to minor to prepare the third movement – and thematically – "progressing (or retrogressing) from the state of celebration to a recognition of the humility of Christ's state".

The da capo alto aria is accompanied by unison oboe d'amore and strings. It expands on the minor mode and theme of privation established in the second movement. The movement emphasizes the interval of the seventh and the technique of inversion to support the meaning of the text. It begins with a chromatic string line led by solo violin, which when the vocal line begins "becomes inextricably, even obsessively, intertwined" with the singer.

The tenor recitative reverses the motion of the bass, modulating from minor to major and changing the emphasis of the text from humility to celebration. It is secco, short, and simple in its melody.

The final movement is a four-part setting of the eighth and final stanza of Herman's chorale.

== Recordings ==
- Amsterdam Baroque Orchestra & Choir, Ton Koopman. J. S. Bach: Complete Cantatas Vol. 18. Antoine Marchand, 2002.
- Bach Collegium Japan, Masaaki Suzuki. J. S. Bach: Cantatas Vol. 43. BIS, 2008.
- Choir and Orchestra "Pro Arte" Munich, Kurt Redel. J. S. Bach: Cantatas Nos. 157 · 55 · 151. Erato, 1956.
- Frankfurter Kantorei / Bach-Collegium Stuttgart, Helmuth Rilling. Die Bach Kantate. Hänssler, 1971.
- Holland Boys Choir / Netherlands Bach Collegium, Pieter Jan Leusink. Bach Edition Vol. 12 – Cantatas Vol. 6. Brilliant Classics, 1999.
- Monteverdi Choir / English Baroque Soloists, John Eliot Gardiner. Bach Cantatas Vol. 15: New York. Soli Deo Gloria, 2000.
