= Es ist dir gesagt, Mensch, was gut ist, BWV 45 =

Church cantata by Johann Sebastian Bach

Es ist dir gesagt, Mensch, was gut ist
- BWV 45
- Church cantata by Johann Sebastian Bach
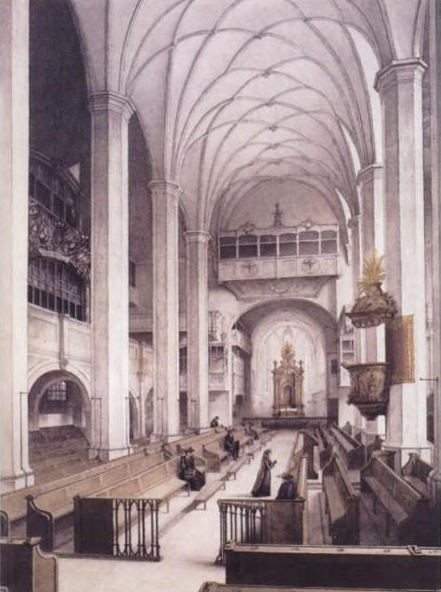
- Thomaskirche, Leipzig
- English: It has been told to you, man, what is good
- Occasion: Eighth Sunday after Trinity
- Bible text: Micah 6:8; Matthew 7:22
- Chorale: by Johann Heermann
- Performed: 11 August 1726: Leipzig
- Movements: 7 in two parts
- Vocal: SATB choir; Solo: alto, tenor and bass
- Instrumental: 2 flauti traversi; 2 oboes; 2 violins; viola; continuo

Es ist dir gesagt, Mensch, was gut ist (It has been told to you, man, what is good), BWV 45 is a church cantata by Johann Sebastian Bach. He composed it in Leipzig for the eighth Sunday after Trinity and first performed it on 11 August 1726.

== History and words ==
Bach composed the cantata in Leipzig for the Eighth Sunday after Trinity. It is part of his third cantata cycle.

The prescribed readings for the Sunday are from the Epistle to the Romans, "For as many as are led by the Spirit of God, they are the sons of God" (Romans 8:12–17), and from the Gospel of Matthew, the warning of false prophets from the Sermon on the Mount (Matthew 7:15–23). Here and in Siehe, ich will viel Fischer aussenden, BWV 88, composed three weeks before, the text is similar in structure and content to cantatas of Johann Ludwig Bach. The text is attributed to Ernst Ludwig, Duke of Saxe-Meiningen, published in a 1705 collection. The poet chose for the opening a verse of the prophet Micah, "He hath shewed thee, O man, what is good; and what doth the Lord require of thee, but to do justly, and to love mercy, and to walk humbly with thy God?" (Micah 6:8), which is related to the famous saying of Jesus "Ye shall know them by their fruits", and "but he that doeth the will of my Father" from the Gospel. The poet connected to the image of the servant as mentioned in the Gospel of Luke, Luke 12:42–47 and Luke 16:1–9. The central movement, opening the second part (marked Parte seconda) to be performed after the sermon, is a quotation of Matthew 7:22, "Many will say to me in that day, Lord, Lord, have we not prophesied in thy name? and in thy name have cast out devils? and in thy name done many wonderful works?". The following aria is a paraphrase of Matthew 10:32. The cantata is closed by the second stanza of Johann Heermann's hymn "O Gott, du frommer Gott" (1630). The cantata is a symmetrical structure around the central Gospel quotation, beginning with the Old Testament and leading to the chorale.

Bach first performed the cantata on 11 August 1726.

== Scoring and structure ==
The cantata in seven movements is scored for three vocal soloists (alto, tenor, and bass), a four-part choir, two flauti traversi, two oboes, two violins, viola and basso continuo.

Movements of Es ist dir gesagt, Mensch, was gut ist, BWV 45, Part I
| No. | Title | Type | Vocal | Winds | Strings | Key | Time |
|---|---|---|---|---|---|---|---|
| 1 | Es ist dir gesagt, Mensch, was gut ist | Chorus | SATB | 2Fl, 2Ob | 2Vl, Va, Bc | E major | cut time |
| 2 | Der Höchste läßt mich seinen Willen wissen | Recitative | Tenor | | Bc | | common time |
| 3 | Weiß ich Gottes Rechte | Aria | Tenor | | 2Vl, Va, Bc | C♯ minor | 3/8 |

Movements of Es ist dir gesagt, Mensch, was gut ist, BWV 45, Part II
| No. | Title | Type | Vocal | Winds | Strings | Key | Time |
|---|---|---|---|---|---|---|---|
| 4 | Es werden viele zu mir sagen an jenem Tage | Arioso | Bass | | 2Vl, Va, Bc | A major | common time |
| 5 | Wer Gott bekennt aus wahrem Herzensgrund | Aria | Alto | 1Fl | Bc | F♯ minor | common time |
| 6 | So wird denn Herz und Mund selbst von mir Richter sein | Recitative | Alto | | Bc | | common time |
| 7 | Gib, daß ich tu mit Fleiß | Chorale | SATB | 2Fl (col Soprano), 2Ob (col Soprano) | 1Vl (col Soprano), 1Vl (coll'Alto), Va (col Tenore), Bc | E major | common time |

== Music ==
The opening chorus is a complex structure, beginning with an extended instrumental section, then alternating fugal sections with others in which the vocal parts are embedded in the orchestral concerto. The tenor aria, preceded by secco recitative, is of a dance-like character and is accompanied by the strings.

The central movement, the quotation from the Gospel, is given to the bass as the vox Christi (voice of Christ). Bach marks it Arioso and has the strings play in vivid movement, to passionately emphasize the words. The strings open the movement and repeat that music four times in different keys, the bass part showing bold leaps and rich coloraturas. John Eliot Gardiner observes:

The second part of the cantata opens with a movement for bass and strings marked arioso – deceptively so (it is Bach’s way of flagging up utterances by Christ in person as distinct from passages of indirect speech), as in truth this is a full blown, highly virtuosic aria, half Vivaldian concerto, half operatic scena.

The figuration is similar in the following alto aria, but mellow in the solo flute with continuo, matching the consoling words. Another secco recitative introduces the closing chorale on a melody by Ahasverus Fritsch, set in four parts.

== Recordings ==
- Bach Cantatas Vol. 4 – Sundays after Trinity I, Karl Richter, Münchener Bach-Chor, Münchener Bach-Orchester, Hertha Töpper, Ernst Haefliger, Kieth Engen, Archiv Produktion 1959
- J. S. Bach: Cantatas No. 105 & No. 45, Ernest Ansermet, Chœur Pro Arte de Lausanne, L'Orchestre de la Suisse Romande, Helen Watts, Ian Partridge, Tom Krause, Decca 1966
- J. S. Bach: Kantaten BWV 45, BWV 176, Helmuth Rilling, Gächinger Kantorei, Bach-Collegium Stuttgart, Norma Procter, Kurt Equiluz, Erich Wenk, Cantate 1967
- J. S. Bach: Das Kantatenwerk – Sacred Cantatas Vol. 3, Gustav Leonhardt, Knabenchor Hannover, Leonhardt-Consort, René Jacobs, Kurt Equiluz, Hanns-Friedrich Kunz, Teldec 1974
- Die Bach Kantate Vol. 45, Helmuth Rilling, Gächinger Kantorei, Bach-Collegium Stuttgart, Julia Hamari, Aldo Baldin, Philippe Huttenlocher, Hänssler 1982
- Bach Edition Vol. 9 – Cantatas Vol. 4, conductor Pieter Jan Leusink, Holland Boys Choir, Netherlands Bach Collegium, Sytse Buwalda, Knut Schoch, Bas Ramselaar, Brilliant Classics 1999
- Bach Cantatas Vol. 5: Rendsburg/Braunschweig / For the 8th Sunday after Trinity, John Eliot Gardiner, Monteverdi Choir, English Baroque Soloists, Robin Tyson, Christoph Genz, Brindley Sherratt, Archiv Produktion 2000
- J. S. Bach: Complete Cantatas Vol. 18, Ton Koopman, Amsterdam Baroque Orchestra & Choir, Bogna Bartosz, Christoph Prégardien, Klaus Mertens, Antoine Marchand 2002
- J. S. Bach: Cantatas Vol. 46 – Cantatas from Leipzig 1724, Masaaki Suzuki, Bach Collegium Japan, Robin Blaze, Gerd Türk, Peter Kooy, BIS 2009

== Sources ==
- Literature by and about Es ist dir gesagt, Mensch, was gut ist, BWV 45 in the German National Library catalogue
- Es ist dir gesagt, Mensch, was gut ist, BWV 45: Scores at the International Music Score Library Project
- Es ist dir gesagt, Mensch, was gut ist BWV 45; BC A 113 / Sacred cantata (8th Sunday after Trinity) Bach Digital
- Cantata BWV 45 Es ist dir gesagt, Mensch, was gut ist history, scoring, sources for text and music, translations to various languages, discography, discussion, Bach Cantatas Website
- BWV 45 Es ist dir gesagt, Mensch, was gut ist English translation, University of Vermont
- BWV 45 Es ist dir gesagt, Mensch, was gut ist text, scoring, University of Alberta
- Chapter 21 Bwv 45 – The Cantatas of Johann Sebastian Bach Julian Mincham, 2010
- Luke Dahn: BWV 45.7 bach-chorales.com
