= Erhöhtes Fleisch und Blut, BWV 173 =

Pentecost Monday cantata by J.S. Bach

Erhöhtes Fleisch und Blut
- BWV 173 (173.2)
- Church cantata by J. S. Bach
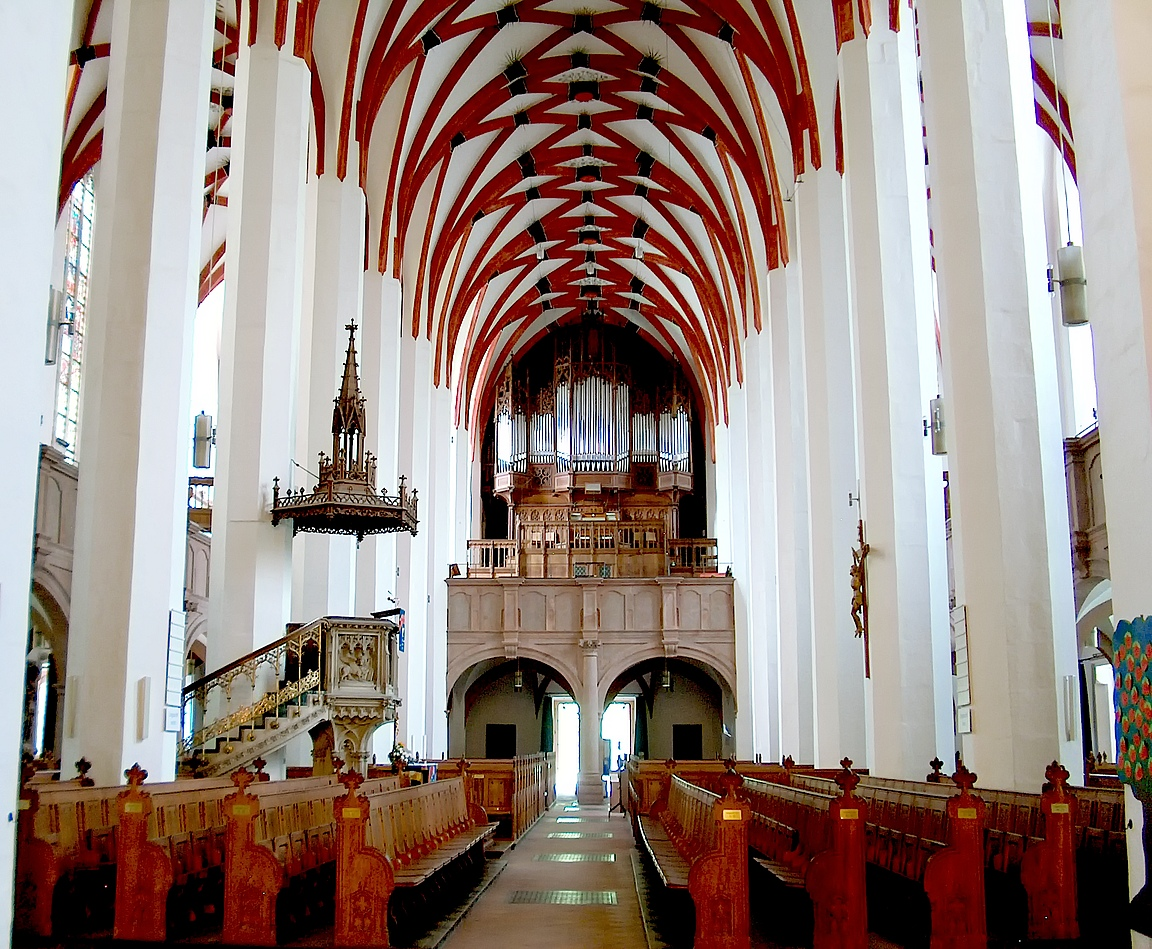
- Thomaskirche, Leipzig
- Related: based on BWV 173a
- Occasion: Pentecost Monday
- Performed: 29 May 1724?: Leipzig
- Movements: 6
- Vocal: SATB solo and choir
- Instrumental: 2 flauti traversi; 2 violins; viola; continuo

Erhöhtes Fleisch und Blut (Exalted flesh and blood), BWV 173 (BWV 173.2), is a church cantata by Johann Sebastian Bach. He composed it in Leipzig for Pentecost Monday and probably first performed it on 29 May 1724.

== History and words ==
Bach probably wrote the cantata in his first year in Leipzig for Pentecost Monday. He based it on a congratulatory cantata Durchlauchtster Leopold, BWV 173.1, composed in Köthen. The music of the 1724 version is lost, but a version of 1727 is extant. Possibly the 1724 version was even closer to the secular work than the existing version. The unknown poet wrote parodies for six of the eight movements of the congratulatory cantata, including two recitatives in movements 1 and 5. Bach did not use movements 6 and 7 in this church cantata, but movement 7 was used in a later work, Er rufet seinen Schafen mit Namen, BWV 175.

The prescribed readings for the feast day were from the Acts of the Apostles, the sermon of Peter for Cornelius (Acts 10:42–48), and from the Gospel of John, "God so loved the world" from the meeting of Jesus and Nicodemus (John 3:16–21). The poetry is a general praise of God's great goodness towards men. Only movements 1 and 4 relate to the Gospel; the first stanza of movement 4 is a close paraphrase of the beginning of the gospel text, "Also hat Gott die Welt geliebt …" (For God so loved the world, that he gave his only begotten Son, that whosoever believeth in him should not perish, but have everlasting life.) This verse became the opening chorus of Also hat Gott die Welt geliebt, BWV 68, for the same occasion a year later.

Bach probably first performed the cantata on 29 May 1724, and performed it again on 2 June 1727 and 14 May 1731.

== Scoring and structure ==
The cantata in six movements is scored for four vocal soloists (soprano, alto, tenor and bass), a four-part choir, two flauto traverso, two violins, viola and basso continuo, whereas the original secular cantata is scored for only soprano and bass soloists.

1. Recitative (tenor): Erhöhtes Fleisch und Blut
2. Aria (tenor): Ein geheiligtes Gemüte
3. Aria (alto): Gott will, o ihr Menschenkinder
4. Aria (soprano, bass): So hat Gott die Welt geliebt
5. Aria (soprano, tenor): Unendlichster, den man doch Vater nennt
6. Chorus: Rühre, Höchster, unsern Geist

== Music ==
Bach gave the first movement to the tenor instead of the soprano in the secular work and changed the vocal line considerably, but wrote these changes into the original part. Movement 4, a paraphrase of the quotation from the gospel, is a duet, which handles three stanzas in ever richer variations: the first stanza is for bass and strings in G major, the second in higher D major for soprano and additional flutes, the final one for both voices in A major and with more figuration. The structure of this duet is unique in Bach's cantatas, the variations in rising keys, and the increase in instruments and musical texture all add to illustrate the exaltation mentioned in the title of the cantata. For the Baroque, the exaltation of the noble employer of the secular cantata could be adapted without change to the exaltation of God. The final chorus, based on a duet as movement 8 of BWV 173.1, is partly expanded to four parts, but in homophony.

== Recordings ==
- Bach: 13 Sacred Cantatas & 13 Sinfonias, Helmut Winschermann, Kantorei Barmen-Gemarke, Deutsche Bachsolisten, Ileana Cotrubas, Julia Hamari, Kurt Equiluz, Hermann Prey, Philips 1971
- Bach Made in Germany Vol. 4 – Cantatas V, Hans-Joachim Rotzsch, Thomanerchor, Gewandhausorchester, Regina Werner, Heidi Rieß, Hans-Joachim Rotzsch, Siegfried Lorenz, Eterna 1974
- J. S. Bach: Das Kantatenwerk – Sacred Cantatas Vol. 9, Nikolaus Harnoncourt, Tölzer Knabenchor, Concentus Musicus Wien, soloists of the Tölzer Knabenchor, Kurt Equiluz, Robert Holl, Teldec 1995
- J. S. Bach: Complete Cantatas Vol. 7, Ton Koopman, Amsterdam Baroque Orchestra & Choir, Lisa Larsson, Elisabeth von Magnus, Gerd Türk, Klaus Mertens, Antoine Marchand 1997
- Bach Cantatas Vol. 26: Long Melford For Whit Sunday For Whit Monday, John Eliot Gardiner, Monteverdi Choir, English Baroque Soloists, Lisa Larsson, Nathalie Stutzmann, Christoph Genz, Panajotis Iconomou, Soli Deo Gloria 2000
- J. S. Bach: Cantatas Vol. 20 – Cantatas from Leipzig 1724, Masaaki Suzuki, Bach Collegium Japan, Yukari Nonoshita, Mutsumi Hatano, Gerd Türk, Peter Kooij, BIS 2001

== Sources ==
- Erhöhtes Fleisch und Blut, BWV 173: Scores at the International Music Score Library Project
- Cantata BWV 173 Erhöhtes Fleisch und Blut: history, scoring, sources for text and music, translations to various languages, discography, discussion, bach-cantatas website
- Erhöhtes Fleisch und Blut: history, scoring, Bach website (in German)
- BWV 173 Erhöhtes Fleisch und Blut: English translation, University of Vermont
- BWV 173 Erhöhtes Fleisch und Blut: text, scoring, University of Alberta
- Gardiner, John Eliot (2006). Johann Sebastian Bach (1685-1750) / Cantatas Nos 34, 59, 68, 74, 172, 173 & 174 (Media notes). Soli Deo Gloria (at Hyperion Records website).
