= Christoph Birkmann =

German theologian and pastor (1703–1771)

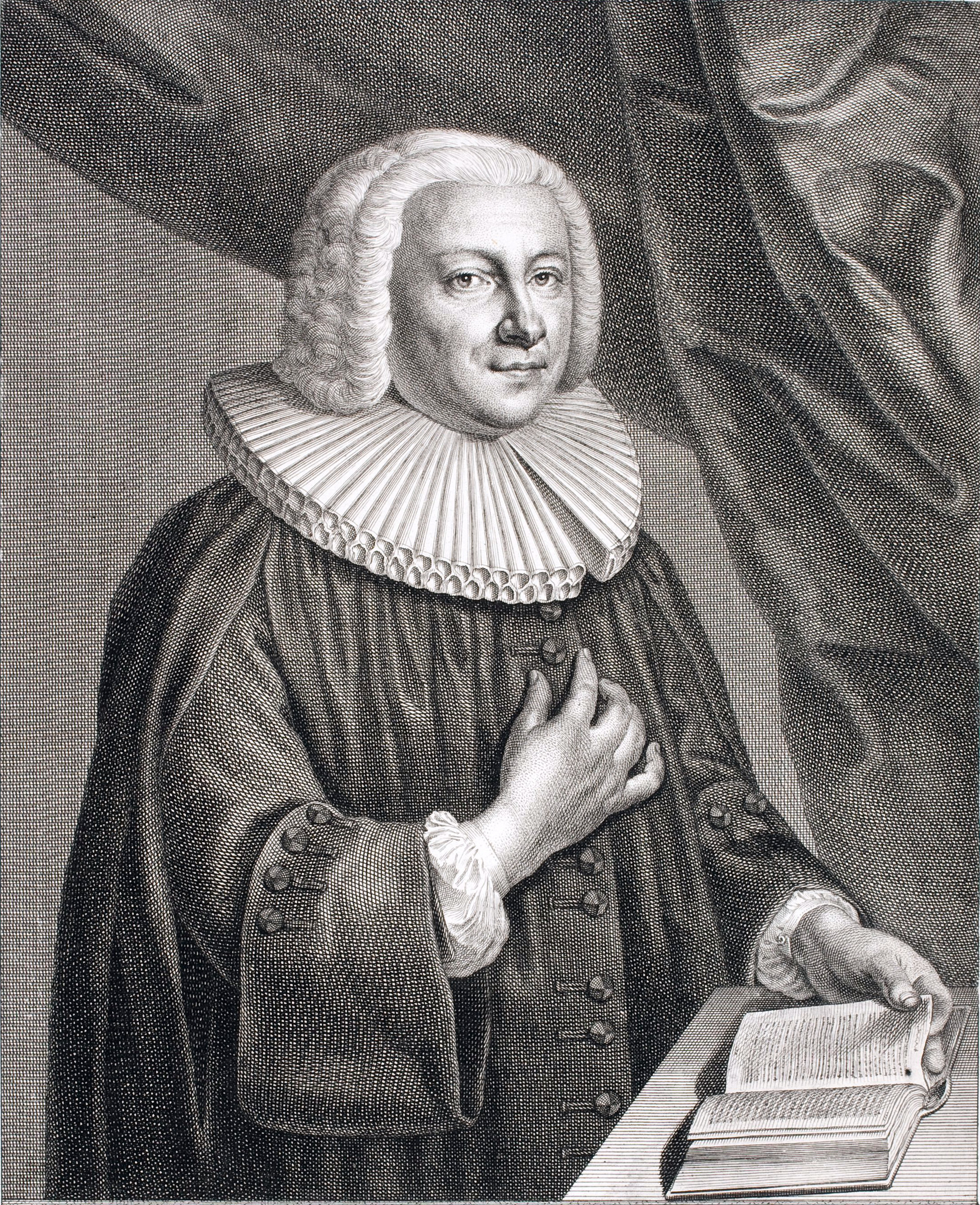
- Birkmann in 1759
- Born: 10 January 1703; Nuremberg, Holy Roman Empire
- Died: 11 March 1771 (aged 68); Nuremberg, Holy Roman Empire
- Occupations: Theologian; Pastor; Poet
- Organizations: St. Egidien, Nuremberg
- Known for: librettos for Johann Sebastian Bach

Christoph Birkmann (10 January 1703 – 11 March 1771) was a German theologian and Lutheran pastor. A pupil of Johann Sebastian Bach, he has been identified as the author of the texts of several Bach cantatas.

== Career ==
Born in Nuremberg, Birkmann received some musical training. He spent a year at the University of Altdorf before studying theology and mathematics at the University of Leipzig from 1724 to 1727.

Birkmann was ordained in 1732 and became minister of St Egidien's Church in Nuremberg. He died there.

=== Birkmann and Bach ===
In 1728 Birkmann published a yearbook of cantata texts in Nuremberg. Birkmann organised the material for the liturgical year of 1728/29, but it was drawn from texts used in the church music at Leipzig during his stay there. Some are known to have been set by Bach, who was working in Leipzig from 1723. The fact that other librettists, such as Picander, are featured obscured Birkmann's creative contribution to the collection. However, according to research by Christine Blanken, published in the Bach-Jahrbuch in 2015, Birkmann was in all probability one of Bach's librettists, his texts including the well-known solo cantata Ich habe genug, BWV 82 (1727). The International Music Score Library Project has recognised Birkmann as the librettist for eight Bach cantatas in total. There is also evidence that Birkmann took part either as a singer or instrumentalist in performances directed by Bach.

== Literature ==
- Christine Blanken (2015), "Christoph Birkmanns Kantatenzyklus "GOtt-geheiligte Sabbaths-Zehnden" von 1728 und die Leipziger Kirchenmusik unter J. S. Bach in den Jahren 1724 - 1727", Bach-Jahrbuch (in German), vol. 101, pp. 13–74, ISBN 978-3-374-04320-0
