= Bach-Werke-Verzeichnis =

Catalogue of J.S. Bach's compositions

The Bach-Werke-Verzeichnis (German: [ˈbax ˌvɛʁkə fɐˈtsaɪçnɪs], lit. 'Bach Works Catalogue'; BWV) is a catalogue of compositions by Johann Sebastian Bach. It was first published in 1950, edited by Wolfgang Schmieder. The catalogue's second edition appeared in 1990 and the third edition in 2022.

The catalogue groups compositions by genre. Even within a genre, compositions are not necessarily collated chronologically. In part this reflects the fact that some compositions cannot be dated. However, an approximate or precise date can be assigned to others: for example, BWV 992 was composed many years before BWV 1.

== Alternative classifications ==
The BWV classification is open to criticism, and the Bach scholar Christoph Wolff was involved in the design of an alternative, the Bach Compendium. Publication of the Bach Compendium began in 1985. The BWV, however, remains the standard reference, and Christoph Wolff has contributed to it as one of principal editors of the third edition.

BWV numbers were assigned to 1,126 compositions in the 20th century, and more have been added to the catalogue in the 21st century. The Annex of the BWV (BWV Anh.) lists over 200 lost, doubtful and spurious compositions. Occasionally works that have no BWV number can be identified by their BC number, e.g. BC C 8 for "Der Gerechte kömmt um", an arrangement attributed to Bach which was unmentioned in 20th-century editions of the BWV.

== History ==
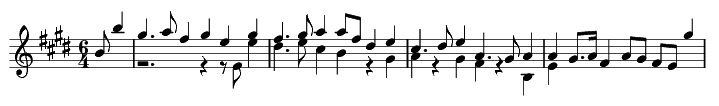
The BWV is a thematic catalogue, thus it identifies every movement of every composition by its first measures, like the opening of BWV 1006, movement 2 (Loure) above.

The first edition of the Bach-Werke-Verzeichnis was published in 1950. It allocated a unique number to every known composition by Bach. Wolfgang Schmieder, the editor of that catalogue, grouped the compositions by genre, largely following the 19th-century Bach Gesellschaft (BG) edition for the collation (e.g., BG cantata number = BWV number of the cantata):

1. Kantaten (Cantatas), BWV 1–224
2. Motetten (Motets), BWV 225–231
3. Messen, Messensätze, Magnificat (Masses, Mass movements, Magnificat), BWV 232–243
4. Passionen, Oratorien (Passions, Oratorios), BWV 244–249
5. Vierstimmige Choräle (Four-part chorales), BWV 250–438
6. Lieder, Arien, Quodlibet (Songs, Arias and Quodlibet), BWV 439–524
7. Werke für Orgel (Works for organ), BWV 525–771
8. Werke für Klavier (Keyboard compositions), BWV 772–994
9. Werke für Laute (Lute compositions), BWV 995–1000
10. Kammermusik (Chamber music), BWV 1001–1040
11. Orchesterwerke (Works for orchestra), BWV 1041–1071, originally in two separate chapters: Concertos (BWV 1041–1065) and Overtures (BWV 1066–1071)
12. Kanons (Canons), BWV 1072–1078
13. Musikalisches Opfer, Kunst der Fuge (Musical Offering, Art of the Fugue), BWV 1079–1080

The Anhang of the BWV listed works that were not suitable for the main catalogue, in three sections:

1. lost works, or works of which only a tiny fraction had survived (Anh. 1–23)
2. works of dubious authenticity (Anh. 24–155)
3. works that were once attributed to Bach, but for which it had been established they were not composed by him (Anh. 156–189)

Within each section of the Anhang the works are sorted by genre, following the same sequence of genres as the main catalogue.

Schmieder published the BWV's second edition in 1990, with some modifications regarding authenticity discriminations, and more works added to the main catalogue and the Anhang. Several compositions were repositioned in the over-all structure of chapters organised by genre and Anhang sections. In 1998 Alfred Dürr and Yoshitake Kobayashi published a small edition of the catalogue, based on the 1990 second edition. This edition, known as BWV^{2a}, contained a few further updates and collation rearrangements.

New additions (Nachträge) to BWV^{2}/BWV^{2a} included:

- BWV 1081–1126
- BWV Anh. 190–213

Numbers above BWV 1126 were added in the 21st century.

The revised, third edition of the Bach-Werke-Verzeichnis (BWV3) was published in 2022. It was edited by Christine Blanken, Christoph Wolff and Peter Wollny with the Bach-Archiv Leipzig. (It was originally announced by the Bach Archive for publication in 2020, but was delayed.)

== List of compositions by BWV number ==
The numbers assigned to compositions by Johann Sebastian Bach and by others in the Bach-Werke-Verzeichnis are widely used for the unique identification of these compositions. Exceptionally BWV numbers are also indicated as Schmieder (S) numbers (e.g. S. 225 = BWV 225).

=== BWV 1–1126 ===
BWV numbers 1 to 1126 appear in the 1998 edition of the Bach-Werke-Verzeichnis.

- BWV 1 – Wie schön leuchtet der Morgenstern (cantata)
- BWV 2 – Ach Gott, vom Himmel sieh darein (cantata)
- BWV 3 – Ach Gott, wie manches Herzeleid (cantata)
- BWV 4 – Christ lag in Todes Banden (cantata):
  - BWV 4.1 – early version
  - BWV 4.2 – Leipzig version
- BWV 5 – Wo soll ich fliehen hin (cantata)
- BWV 6 – Bleib bei uns, denn es will Abend werden (cantata)
- BWV 7 – Christ unser Herr zum Jordan kam (cantata)
- BWV 8 – Liebster Gott, wenn werd ich sterben? (cantata):
  - BWV 8.1 – first version
  - BWV 8.2 – second version
  - BWV 8/6 – "Herrscher über Tod und Leben" (closing chorale) (Note: Listed as spurious in Anh. III of the 1998 edition of the Bach-Werke-Verzeichnis.)
- BWV 9 – Es ist das Heil uns kommen her (cantata)
- BWV 10 – Meine Seel erhebt den Herren (cantata)
- BWV 11 – Lobet Gott in seinen Reichen (oratorio)
- BWV 12 – Weinen, Klagen, Sorgen, Zagen (cantata)
- BWV 13 – Meine Seufzer, meine Tränen (cantata)
- BWV 14 – Wär Gott nicht mit uns diese Zeit (cantata)
- BWV 15 – Denn du wirst meine Seele nicht in der Hölle lassen (cantata)
- BWV 16 – Herr Gott, dich loben wir (cantata)
- BWV 17 – Wer Dank opfert, der preiset mich (cantata)
- BWV 18 – Gleichwie der Regen und Schnee vom Himmel fällt (cantata):
  - BWV 18.1 – early version
  - BWV 18.2 – Leipzig version
- BWV 19 – Es erhub sich ein Streit (cantata)
- BWV 20 – O Ewigkeit, du Donnerwort (cantata)
- BWV 21 – Ich hatte viel Bekümmernis (cantata):
  - BWV 21.1 – first version
  - BWV 21.2 – second version
  - BWV 21.3 – third version
- BWV 22 – Jesus nahm zu sich die Zwölfe (cantata)
- BWV 23 – Du wahrer Gott und Davids Sohn (cantata):
  - BWV 23.1 – first version
  - BWV 23.2 – second version
  - BWV 23.3 – third version
- BWV 24 – Ein ungefärbt Gemüte (cantata)
- BWV 25 – Es ist nichts Gesundes an meinem Leibe (cantata)
- BWV 26 – Ach wie flüchtig, ach wie nichtig (cantata)
- BWV 27 – Wer weiß, wie nahe mir mein Ende? (cantata)
- BWV 28 – Gottlob! nun geht das Jahr zu Ende (cantata)
  - BWV 28/2a (formerly BWV 231) – Sei Lob und Preis mit Ehren (motet, variant of second movement of BWV 28 and of BWV Anh. 160)
- BWV 29 – Wir danken dir, Gott, wir danken dir (cantata)
- BWV 30:
  - BWV 30.1 (previously **30a**) – Angenehmes Wiederau (secular cantata)
  - BWV 30.2 (previously **30**) – Freue dich, erlöste Schar (cantata)
- BWV 31 – Der Himmel lacht! Die Erde jubilieret (cantata):
  - BWV 31.1 – Weimar version
  - BWV 31.2 – Leipzig version
- BWV 32 – Liebster Jesu, mein Verlangen (cantata)
- BWV 33 – Allein zu dir, Herr Jesu Christ (cantata)
- BWV 34 – O ewiges Feuer, o Ursprung der Liebe (cantata):
  - BWV 34.1 (previously **34**) – for Pentecost
  - BWV 34.2 (previously **34a**) – for wedding
- BWV 35 – Geist und Seele wird verwirret (cantata)
- BWV 36:
  - BWV 36.1 (previously **36c**) – Schwingt freudig euch empor (secular cantata)
  - BWV 36.2 (previously **36a**) – Steigt freudig in die Luft (secular cantata)
  - BWV 36.3 (previously **36b**) – Die Freude reget sich (secular cantata)
  - BWV 36.4 (previously **36** (1)) – Schwingt freudig euch empor (cantata), early version
  - BWV 36.5 (previously **36** (2)) – Schwingt freudig euch empor (cantata)
- BWV 37 – Wer da gläubet und getauft wird (cantata)
- BWV 38 – Aus tiefer Not schrei ich zu dir (cantata)
- BWV 39 – Brich dem Hungrigen dein Brot (cantata)
- BWV 40 – Darzu ist erschienen der Sohn Gottes (cantata)
- BWV 41 – Jesu, nun sei gepreiset (cantata)
- BWV 42 – Am Abend aber desselbigen Sabbats (cantata)
- BWV 43 – Gott fähret auf mit Jauchzen (cantata)
  - BWV 43/11 – "Du Lebensfürst, Herr Jesu Christ" (closing chorale)
- BWV 44 – Sie werden euch in den Bann tun (cantata)
- BWV 45 – Es ist dir gesagt, Mensch, was gut ist (cantata)
- BWV 46 – Schauet doch und sehet, ob irgend ein Schmerz sei (cantata)
- BWV 47 – Wer sich selbst erhöhet, der soll erniedriget werden (cantata)
- BWV 48 – Ich elender Mensch, wer wird mich erlösen (cantata)
- BWV 49 – Ich geh und suche mit Verlangen (cantata)
- BWV 50 – Nun ist das Heil und die Kraft (cantata)
- BWV 51 – Jauchzet Gott in allen Landen (cantata)
- BWV 52 – Falsche Welt, dir trau ich nicht (cantata)
- BWV 53 – Schlage doch, gewünschte Stunde (cantata) (Note: Listed as doubtful in Anh. II of the 1998 edition of the Bach-Werke-Verzeichnis.)
- BWV 54 – Widerstehe doch der Sünde (cantata)
- BWV 55 – Ich armer Mensch, ich Sündenknecht (cantata)
- BWV 56 – Ich will den Kreuzstab gerne tragen (cantata)
- BWV 57 – Selig ist der Mann (cantata)
- BWV 58 – Ach Gott, wie manches Herzeleid (cantata):
  - BWV 58.1 – early version
  - BWV 58.2 – later version
- BWV 59 – Wer mich liebet, der wird mein Wort halten (cantata)
- BWV 60 – O Ewigkeit, du Donnerwort (cantata)
- BWV 61 – Nun komm, der Heiden Heiland (cantata)
- BWV 62 – Nun komm, der Heiden Heiland (cantata)
- BWV 63 – Christen, ätzet diesen Tag (cantata)
- BWV 64 – Sehet, welch eine Liebe hat uns der Vater erzeiget (cantata)
- BWV 65 – Sie werden aus Saba alle kommen (cantata)
- BWV 66:
  - BWV 66.1 (previously **66a**) – Der Himmel dacht auf Anhalts Ruhm und Glück (secular cantata)
  - BWV 66.2 (previously **66**) – Erfreut euch, ihr Herzen (cantata)
- BWV 67 – Halt im Gedächtnis Jesum Christ (cantata)
- BWV 68 – Also hat Gott die Welt geliebt (cantata)
- BWV 69 – Lobe den Herrn, meine Seele (cantata):
  - BWV 69.1 (previously **69a**) – for the 12th Sunday after Trinity
  - BWV 69.2 (previously **69**) – for council election
- BWV 70 – Wachet! Betet! Betet! Wachet! (cantata):
  - BWV 70.1 (previously **70a**) – for the 2nd Sunday of Advent
  - BWV 70.2 (previously **70**) – for the 26th Sunday after Trinity
- BWV 71 – Gott ist mein König (cantata)
- BWV 72 – Alles nur nach Gottes Willen (cantata)
- BWV 73 – Herr, wie du willt, so schicks mit mir (cantata)
- BWV 74 – Wer mich liebet, der wird mein Wort halten (cantata)
- BWV 75 – Die Elenden sollen essen (cantata)
- BWV 76 – Die Himmel erzählen die Ehre Gottes (cantata)
- BWV 77 – Du sollt Gott, deinen Herren, lieben (cantata)
- BWV 78 – Jesu, der du meine Seele (cantata)
- BWV 79 – Gott der Herr ist Sonn und Schild (cantata)
- BWV 80:
  - BWV 80.1 (previously **80a**) – Alles, was von Gott geboren (cantata), Weimar version
  - BWV 80.2 (previously **80b**) – Ein feste Burg ist unser Gott (cantata), first Leipzig version
  - BWV 80.3 (previously **80**) – Ein feste Burg ist unser Gott (cantata), second Leipzig version
- BWV 81 – Jesus schläft, was soll ich hoffen? (cantata)
- BWV 82 – Ich habe genug (cantata): (Note: Appears, in whole or in part, in the 1722 or 1725 Notebook for Anna Magdalena Bach.)
  - BWV 82.1 – first version
  - BWV 82.2 – second version
  - BWV 82.3 – third version
- BWV 83 – Erfreute Zeit im neuen Bunde (cantata)
- BWV 84 – Ich bin vergnügt mit meinem Glücke (cantata)
- BWV 85 – Ich bin ein guter Hirt (cantata)
- BWV 86 – Wahrlich, wahrlich, ich sage euch (cantata)
- BWV 87 – Bisher habt ihr nichts gebeten in meinem Namen (cantata)
- BWV 88 – Siehe, ich will viel Fischer aussenden (cantata)
- BWV 89 – Was soll ich aus dir machen, Ephraim (cantata)
- BWV 90 – Es reißet euch ein schrecklich Ende (cantata)
- BWV 91 – Gelobet seist du, Jesu Christ (cantata):
  - BWV 91.1 – early version
  - BWV 91.2 – later version
- BWV 92 – Ich hab in Gottes Herz und Sinn (cantata)
- BWV 93 – Wer nur den lieben Gott läßt walten (cantata)
- BWV 94 – Was frag ich nach der Welt (cantata)
- BWV 95 – Christus, der ist mein Leben (cantata)
- BWV 96 – Herr Christ, der einge Gottessohn (cantata)
- BWV 97 – In allen meinen Taten (cantata)
- BWV 98 – Was Gott tut, das ist wohlgetan (cantata)
- BWV 99 – Was Gott tut, das ist wohlgetan (cantata)
- BWV 100 – Was Gott tut, das ist wohlgetan (cantata)
- BWV 101 – Nimm von uns, Herr, du treuer Gott (cantata)
- BWV 102 – Herr, deine Augen sehen nach dem Glauben (cantata)
- BWV 103 – Ihr werdet weinen und heulen (cantata)
- BWV 104 – Du Hirte Israel, höre (cantata)
- BWV 105 – Herr, gehe nicht ins Gericht mit deinem Knecht (cantata)
- BWV 106 – Gottes Zeit ist die allerbeste Zeit (cantata)
- BWV 107 – Was willst du dich betrüben (cantata)
- BWV 108 – Es ist euch gut, daß ich hingehe (cantata)
- BWV 109 – Ich glaube, lieber Herr, hilf meinem Unglauben (cantata)
- BWV 110 – Unser Mund sei voll Lachens (cantata)
- BWV 111 – Was mein Gott will, das g'scheh allzeit (cantata)
- BWV 112 – Der Herr ist mein getreuer Hirt (cantata)
- BWV 113 – Herr Jesu Christ, du höchstes Gut (cantata)
- BWV 114 – Ach, lieben Christen, seid getrost (cantata)
- BWV 115 – Mache dich, mein Geist, bereit (cantata)
- BWV 116 – Du Friedefürst, Herr Jesu Christ (cantata)
- BWV 117 – Sei Lob und Ehr dem höchsten Gut (cantata)
- BWV 118 – O Jesu Christ, meins Lebens Licht (motet):
  - BWV 118.1 – first version
  - BWV 118.2 – second version
- BWV 119 – Preise, Jerusalem, den Herrn (cantata)
- BWV 120:
  - BWV 120.1 (previously **120**) – Gott, man lobet dich in der Stille (cantata)
  - BWV 120.2 (previously **120a**) – Herr Gott, Beherrscher aller Dinge (cantata)
  - BWV 120.3 (previously **120b**) – Gott, man lobet dich in der Stille (cantata), for the 200th Anniversary of the Augsburg Confession
- BWV 121 – Christum wir sollen loben schon (cantata)
- BWV 122 – Das neugeborne Kindelein (cantata)
- BWV 123 – Liebster Immanuel, Herzog der Frommen (cantata)
- BWV 124 – Meinen Jesum laß ich nicht (cantata)
- BWV 125 – Mit Fried und Freud ich fahr dahin (cantata)
- BWV 126 – Erhalt uns, Herr, bei deinem Wort (cantata)
- BWV 127 – Herr Jesu Christ, wahr' Mensch und Gott (cantata)
- BWV 128 – Auf Christi Himmelfahrt allein (cantata)
- BWV 129 – Gelobet sei der Herr, mein Gott (cantata)
- BWV 130 – Herr Gott, dich loben alle wir (cantata):
  - BWV 130.1 – first version
  - BWV 130.2 – second version
- BWV 131 – Aus der Tiefen rufe ich, Herr, zu dir (cantata)
  - BWV 131a – Fugue in G minor (after 5th movement of BWV 131)
- BWV 132 – Bereitet die Wege, bereitet die Bahn (cantata)
- BWV 133 – Ich freue mich in dir (cantata)
- BWV 134:
  - BWV 134.1 (previously **134a**) – Die Zeit, die Tag und Jahre macht (secular cantata)
  - BWV 134.2 (previously **134**) – Ein Herz, das seinen Jesum lebend weiß (cantata), early version
  - BWV 134.3 (previously **134**) – Ein Herz, das seinen Jesum lebend weiß (cantata), later version
- BWV 135 – Ach Herr, mich armen Sünder (cantata)
- BWV 136 – Erforsche mich, Gott, und erfahre mein Herz (cantata)
- BWV 137 – Lobe den Herren, den mächtigen König der Ehren (cantata)
- BWV 138 – Warum betrübst du dich, mein Herz (cantata)
- BWV 139 – Wohl dem, der sich auf seinen Gott (cantata)
- BWV 140 – Wachet auf, ruft uns die Stimme (cantata)
- BWV 141 – Das ist je gewißlich wahr (cantata)
- BWV 142 – Uns ist ein Kind geboren (cantata)
- BWV 143 – Lobe den Herrn, meine Seele (cantata)
- BWV 144 – Nimm, was dein ist, und gehe hin (cantata)
- BWV 145 – Ich lebe, mein Herze, zu deinem Ergötzen (cantata)
  - BWV 145/b – "So du mit deinem Munde bekennest Jesum" (cantata movement, basis for BWV 145/2)
- BWV 146 – Wir müssen durch viel Trübsal (cantata)
- BWV 147 – Herz und Mund und Tat und Leben (cantata):
  - BWV 147.1 (previously **147a**) – for the 4th Sunday of Advent
  - BWV 147.2 (previously **147**) – for the Visitation of Mary
- BWV 148 – Bringet dem Herrn Ehre seines Namens (cantata)
- BWV 149 – Man singet mit Freuden vom Sieg (cantata)
  - BWV 149/1a (formerly BWV Anh. 198) – start (sinfonia) of an abandoned cantata, possibly a first attempt to set the libretto of BWV 149
- BWV 150 – Nach dir, Herr, verlanget mich (cantata)
- BWV 151 – Süßer Trost, mein Jesus kömmt (cantata)
- BWV 152 – Tritt auf die Glaubensbahn (cantata)
- BWV 153 – Schau, lieber Gott, wie meine Feind (cantata)
- BWV 154 – Mein liebster Jesus ist verloren (cantata)
- BWV 155 – Mein Gott, wie lang, ach lange? (cantata)
- BWV 156 – Ich steh mit einem Fuß im Grabe (cantata)
- BWV 157 – Ich lasse dich nicht, du segnest mich denn (cantata):
  - BWV 157.1 – libretto as published by Picander
  - BWV 157.2 – extant cantata: libretto as used at Ponickau's funeral service in Pomßen
- BWV 158 – Der Friede sei mit dir (cantata)
- BWV 159 – Sehet, wir gehn hinauf gen Jerusalem (cantata)
- BWV 160 – Ich weiß, daß mein Erlöser lebt (cantata)
- BWV 161 – Komm, du süße Todesstunde (cantata)
- BWV 162 – Ach! ich sehe, itzt, da ich zur Hochzeit gehe (cantata):
  - BWV 162.1 – Weimar version
  - BWV 162.2 – Leipzig version
- BWV 163 – Nur jedem das Seine (cantata)
- BWV 164 – Ihr, die ihr euch von Christo nennet (cantata)
- BWV 165 – O heilges Geist- und Wasserbad (cantata)
- BWV 166 – Wo gehest du hin? (cantata)
- BWV 167 – Ihr Menschen, rühmet Gottes Liebe (cantata)
- BWV 168 – Tue Rechnung! Donnerwort (cantata)
- BWV 169 – Gott soll allein mein Herze haben (cantata)
- BWV 170 – Vergnügte Ruh, beliebte Seelenlust (cantata)
- BWV 171 – Gott, wie dein Name, so ist auch dein Ruhm (cantata)
- BWV 172 – Erschallet, ihr Lieder, erklinget, ihr Saiten! (cantata):
  - BWV 172.1 – Weimar version
  - BWV 172.2 – second version
  - BWV 172.3 – third version
- BWV 173:
  - BWV 173.1 (previously **173a**) – Durchlauchtster Leopold (secular cantata)
  - BWV 173.2 (previously **173**) – Erhöhtes Fleisch und Blut (cantata)
- BWV 174 – Ich liebe den Höchsten von ganzem Gemüte (cantata)
- BWV 175 – Er rufet seinen Schafen mit Namen (cantata)
- BWV 176 – Es ist ein trotzig und verzagt Ding (cantata)
- BWV 177 – Ich ruf zu dir, Herr Jesu Christ (cantata)
- BWV 178 – Wo Gott der Herr nicht bei uns hält (cantata)
- BWV 179 – Siehe zu, daß deine Gottesfurcht nicht Heuchelei sei (cantata)
- BWV 180 – Schmücke dich, o liebe Seele (cantata)
- BWV 181 – Leichtgesinnte Flattergeister (cantata)
- BWV 182 – Himmelskönig, sei willkommen (cantata)
- BWV 183 – Sie werden euch in den Bann tun (cantata)
- BWV 184:
  - BWV 184.1 (previously **184a**) – secular cantata for New Year 1721 (model for some movements of BWV 184)
  - BWV 184.2 (previously **184**) – Erwünschtes Freudenlicht (cantata)
- BWV 185 – Barmherziges Herze der ewigen Liebe (cantata):
  - BWV 185.1 – Weimar version
  - BWV 185.2 – Leipzig version
- BWV 186 – Ärgre dich, o Seele, nicht (cantata):
  - BWV 186.1 (previously **186a**) – for the 3rd Sunday of Advent
  - BWV 186.2 (previously **186**) – for the 7th Sunday after Trinity
- BWV 187 – Es wartet alles auf dich (cantata)
- BWV 188 – Ich habe meine Zuversicht (cantata)
- BWV 189 – Meine Seele rühmt und preist (cantata)
- BWV 190 – Singet dem Herrn ein neues Lied (cantata):
  - BWV 190.1 (previously **190**) – for New Year
  - BWV 190.2 (previously **190a**) – for the 200th Anniversary of the Augsburg Confession
- BWV 191 – Gloria in excelsis Deo (cantata; church music in Latin)
- BWV 192 – Nun danket alle Gott (cantata)
- BWV 193:
  - BWV 193.1 (previously **193a**) – Ihr Häuser des Himmels, ihr scheinenden Lichter (secular cantata)
  - BWV 193.2 (previously **193**) – Ihr Tore zu Zion (cantata)
- BWV 194:
  - BWV 194.1 (previously **194a**) – model for BWV 194 (secular cantata)
  - BWV 194.2 (previously **194**) – Höchsterwünschtes Freudenfest (cantata), Störmthal version
  - BWV 194.3 (previously **194**) – Höchsterwünschtes Freudenfest (cantata), first Leipzig version
  - BWV 194.4 (previously **194**) – second Leipzig version
- BWV 195 – Dem Gerechten muß das Licht (cantata):
  - BWV 195.1 – first version
  - BWV 195.2 – second version
  - BWV 195.3 – latest version
- BWV 196 – Der Herr denket an uns (cantata)
- BWV 197:
  - BWV 197.1 (previously **197a**) – Ehre sei Gott in der Höhe (cantata)
  - BWV 197.2 (previously **197**) – Gott ist unsre Zuversicht (cantata)
- BWV 198 – Laß, Fürstin, laß noch einen Strahl a.k.a. Mourning Ode (secular cantata)
- BWV 199 – Mein Herze schwimmt im Blut (cantata):
  - BWV 199.1 – Weimar version
  - BWV 199.2 – Köthen version
  - BWV 199.3 – Leipzig version
- BWV 200 – "Bekennen will ich seinen Namen", after "Dein Kreuz, o Bräutgam meiner Seelen" by Gottfried Heinrich Stölzel (aria)
- BWV 201 – Geschwinde, ihr wirbelnden Winde a.k.a. The Dispute between Phoebus and Pan (secular cantata)
- BWV 202 – Weichet nur, betrübte Schatten (secular cantata)
- BWV 203 – Amore traditore (secular cantata)
- BWV 204 – Ich bin in mir vergnügt a.k.a. On Contentedness (secular cantata)
- BWV 205:
  - BWV 205.1 (previously **205**) – Zerreißet, zersprenget, zertrümmert die Gruft a.k.a. Aeolus Placated (secular cantata)
  - BWV 205.2 (previously **205a**) – Blast Lärmen, ihr Feinde (secular cantata)
- BWV 206 – Schleicht, spielende Wellen (secular cantata):
  - BWV 206.1 – first version
  - BWV 206.2 – second version
- BWV 207:
  - BWV 207.1 (previously **207**) – Vereinigte Zwietracht der wechselnden Saiten (secular cantata)
  - BWV 207.2 (previously **207a**) – Auf, schmetternde Töne der muntern Trompeten (secular cantata)
- BWV 208 – Was mir behagt, ist nur die muntre Jagd a.k.a. Hunting Cantata (secular cantata):
  - BWV 208.1 (previously **208**) – Weißenfels version
  - BWV 208.2 (previously **208a**) – Weimar version
  - BWV 208.3 (previously **208a**) – Leipzig version
- BWV 209 – Non sa che sia dolore (secular cantata)
- BWV 210:
  - BWV 210.1 (previously **210a**) – O angenehme Melodei (secular cantata)
  - BWV 210.2 (previously **210**) – O holder Tag, erwünschte Zeit (secular cantata)
- BWV 211 – Schweigt stille, plaudert nicht a.k.a. Coffee Cantata (secular cantata)
- BWV 212 – Mer hahn en neue Oberkeet a.k.a. Peasant Cantata (secular cantata)
- BWV 213 – Laßt uns sorgen, laßt uns wachen a.k.a. Hercules at the Crossroads (secular cantata)
- BWV 214 – Tönet, ihr Pauken! Erschallet, Trompeten! (secular cantata)
- BWV 215 – Preise dein Glücke, gesegnetes Sachsen (secular cantata)
- BWV 216:
  - BWV 216.1 (previously **216**) – Vergnügte Pleißenstadt (secular cantata)
  - BWV 216.2 (previously **216a**) – Erwählte Pleißenstadt a.k.a. Apollo and Mercurius (secular cantata)
- BWV 217 – Gedenke, Herr, wie es uns gehet (cantata)
- BWV 218 – Gott der Hoffnung erfülle euch (cantata)
- BWV 219 – Siehe, es hat überwunden der Löwe (cantata)
- BWV 220 – Lobt ihn mit Herz und Munde (cantata)
- BWV 221 – Wer sucht die Pracht, wer wünscht den Glanz (cantata)
- BWV 222 – Mein Odem ist schwach (cantata)
- BWV 223 – Meine Seele soll Gott loben (cantata)
- BWV 224 – Reißt euch los, bedrängte Sinnen (cantata)
- BWV 225 – Singet dem Herrn ein neues Lied (motet)
- BWV 226 – Der Geist hilft unser Schwachheit auf (motet)
- BWV 227 – Jesu, meine Freude (motet)
- BWV 228 – Fürchte dich nicht (motet)
- BWV 229 – Komm, Jesu, komm (motet)
- BWV 230 – Lobet den Herrn, alle Heiden (motet)
- BWV 231 (renumbered to BWV 28/2a, see above)
- BWV 232 – Mass in B minor (church music in Latin)
- BWV 233 – Kyrie–Gloria Mass in F major (church music in Latin)
  - BWV 233a – Kyrie "Christe, du Lamm Gottes" in F major (variants of Kyrie from BWV 233; church music in Latin)
- BWV 234 – Kyrie–Gloria Mass in A major (church music in Latin)
- BWV 235 – Kyrie–Gloria Mass in G minor (church music in Latin)
- BWV 236 – Kyrie–Gloria Mass in G major (church music in Latin)
- BWV 237 – Sanctus in C major (church music in Latin)
- BWV 238 – Sanctus in D major (church music in Latin)
- BWV 239 – Sanctus in D minor (church music in Latin, arrangement)
- BWV 240 – Sanctus in G major (church music in Latin)
- BWV 241 – Sanctus in D major (church music in Latin, arrangement)
- BWV 242 – Christe eleison in G minor (church music in Latin)
- BWV 243 – Magnificat (church music in Latin):
  - BWV 243.1 (previously **243a**) – early version in E♭ major
  - BWV 243.2 (previously **243**) – D major version
- BWV 244 – St Matthew Passion (Passion setting):
  - BWV 244.1 (previously **244b**) – early version
  - BWV 244.2 (previously **244**) – later versions
  - BWV 244a (renumbered to BWV 1143, see below)
- BWV 245 – St John Passion (Passion setting)
  - BWV 245.1 – first version (1724)
  - BWV 245.2 – second version (1725), including:
    - BWV 245a – "Himmel reiße, Welt erbebe" (aria)
    - BWV 245b – "Zerschmettert mich, ihr Felsen und ihr Hügel" (aria)
    - BWV 245c – "Ach, windet euch nicht so, geplagte Seelen" (arioso)
  - BWV 245.3 – third version (1732?)
  - BWV 245.4 – incomplete revision of 1739
  - BWV 245.5 – fourth version (1749)
- BWV 246 – St Luke Passion (Passion setting)
  - BWV 246/40a – "Aus der Tiefen rufe ich" (chorale)
- BWV 247 – St Mark Passion (music lost; Passion setting)
- BWV 248 – Christmas Oratorio (consisting of six cantatas)
  - BWV 248^{VI}a – (textless cantata, model for the sixth cantata of BWV 248)
- BWV 249:
  - BWV 249.1 (previously **249a**) – Entfliehet, verschwindet, entweichet, ihr Sorgen a.k.a. Shepherd Cantata (secular cantata)
  - BWV 249.2 (previously **249b**) – Verjaget, zerstreuet, zerrüttet, ihr Sterne a.k.a. The Celebration of Genius (secular cantata)
  - BWV 249.3 (previously **249**) – Easter Oratorio, early version
  - BWV 249.4 (previously **249**) – Easter Oratorio, middle version
  - BWV 249.5 (previously **249**) – Easter Oratorio, later version
- BWV 250 – "Was Gott tut, das ist wohlgetan" (Three wedding chorales No. 1)
- BWV 251 – "Sei Lob und Ehr dem höchsten Gut" (Three wedding chorales No. 2)
- BWV 252 – "Nun danket alle Gott" (Three wedding chorales No. 3)
- BWV 253 – "Ach bleib bei uns, Herr Jesu Christ" (four-part chorale)
- BWV 254 – "Ach Gott, erhör mein Seufzen" (four-part chorale)
- BWV 255 – "Ach Gott und Herr" (four-part chorale)
- BWV 256 – "Ach lieben Christen seid getrost" (four-part chorale)
- BWV 257 – "Wär Gott nicht mit uns diese Zeit" (four-part chorale)
- BWV 258 – "Wo Gott der Herr nicht bei uns hält" (four-part chorale)
- BWV 259 – "Ach, was soll ich Sünder machen" (four-part chorale)
- BWV 260 – "Allein Gott in der Höh sei Ehr" (four-part chorale)
- BWV 261 – "Allein zu dir, Herr Jesu Christ" (four-part chorale)
- BWV 262 – "Alle Menschen müssen sterben" (four-part chorale)
- BWV 263 – "Alles ist an Gottes Segen" (four-part chorale)
- BWV 264 – "Als der gütige Gott" (four-part chorale)
- BWV 265 – "Als Jesus Christus in der Nacht" (four-part chorale)
- BWV 266 – "Als vierzig Tag nach Ostern warn" (four-part chorale)
- BWV 267 – "An Wasserflüssen Babylon" (or) "Ein Lämmlein geht und trägt die Schuld" (four-part chorale)
- BWV 268 – "Auf, auf, mein Herz, und du mein ganzer Sinn" (four-part chorale)
- BWV 269 – "Aus meines Herzens Grunde" (four-part chorale)
- BWV 270 – "Befiehl du deine Wege" (four-part chorale)
- BWV 271 – "Befiehl du deine Wege" (four-part chorale)
- BWV 272 – "Befiehl du deine Wege" (four-part chorale)
- BWV 273 – "Christ, der du bist der helle Tag" (four-part chorale)
- BWV 274 – "Christe, der du bist Tag und Licht" (four-part chorale)
- BWV 275 – "Christ, du Beistand deiner Kreuzgemeine" (four-part chorale)
- BWV 276 – "Christ ist erstanden" (four-part chorale)
- BWV 277 – "Christ lag in Todesbanden" (four-part chorale)
- BWV 278 – "Christ lag in Todesbanden" (four-part chorale)
- BWV 279 – "Christ lag in Todesbanden" (four-part chorale)
- BWV 280 – "Christ unser Herr zum Jordan kam" (four-part chorale)
- BWV 281 – "Christus, der ist mein Leben" (four-part chorale)
- BWV 282 – "Christus, der ist mein Leben" (four-part chorale)
- BWV 283 – "Christus, der uns selig macht" (four-part chorale)
- BWV 284 – "Christus ist erstanden, hat überwunden" (four-part chorale)
- BWV 285 – "Da der Herr Christ zu Tische saß" (four-part chorale)
- BWV 286 – "Danket dem Herrn, denn er ist sehr freundlich" (four-part chorale)
- BWV 287 – "Dank sei Gott in der Höhe" (four-part chorale)
- BWV 288 – "Das alte Jahr vergangen ist" (four-part chorale)
- BWV 289 – "Das alte Jahr vergangen ist" (four-part chorale)
- BWV 290 – "Das walt Gott Vater und Gott Sohn" (four-part chorale)
- BWV 291 – "Das walt mein Gott" (four-part chorale)
- BWV 292 – "Den Vater dort oben" (four-part chorale)
- BWV 293 – "Der du bist drei in Einigkeit" (four-part chorale)
- BWV 294 – "Der Tag, der ist so freudenreich" (four-part chorale)
- BWV 295 – "Des Heilgen Geistes reiche Gnad" (four-part chorale)
- BWV 296 – "Die Nacht ist kommen" (four-part chorale)
- BWV 297 – "Die Sonn hat sich mit ihrem Glanz gewendet" (four-part chorale)
- BWV 298 – "Dies sind die heilgen zehn Gebot" (four-part chorale)
- BWV 299 – "Dir, dir, Jehova, will ich singen" (four-part chorale)
- BWV 300 – "Du großer Schmerzensmann" (four-part chorale)
- BWV 301 – "Du, o schönes Weltgebäude" (four-part chorale)
- BWV 302 – "Ein feste Burg ist unser Gott" (four-part chorale)
- BWV 303 – "Ein feste Burg ist unser Gott" (four-part chorale)
- BWV 304 – "Eins ist not, ach Herr, dies Eine" (four-part chorale)
- BWV 305 – "Erbarm dich mein, o Herre Gott" (four-part chorale)
- BWV 306 – "Erstanden ist der heilig Christ" (four-part chorale)
- BWV 307 – "Es ist gewisslich an der Zeit" (four-part chorale)
- BWV 308 – "Es spricht der Unweisen Mund wohl" (four-part chorale)
- BWV 309 – "Es stehn vor Gottes Throne" (four-part chorale)
- BWV 310 – "Es wird schier der letzte Tag herkommen" (four-part chorale)
- BWV 311 – "Es woll uns Gott gnädig sein" (four-part chorale)
- BWV 312 – "Es woll uns Gott gnädig sein" (four-part chorale)
- BWV 313 – "Für Freuden lasst uns springen" (four-part chorale)
- BWV 314 – "Gelobt seist du, Jesu Christ" (four-part chorale)
- BWV 315 – "Gib dich zufrieden und sei stille" (four-part chorale)
- BWV 316 – "Gott, der du selber bist das Licht" (four-part chorale)
- BWV 317 – "Gott der Vater wohn uns bei" (four-part chorale)
- BWV 318 – "Gottes Sohn ist kommen" (four-part chorale)
- BWV 319 – "Gott hat das Evangelium" (four-part chorale)
- BWV 320 – "Gott lebet noch" (four-part chorale)
- BWV 321 – "Gottlob, es geht nunmehr zum Ende" (four-part chorale)
- BWV 322 – "Gott sei gelobet und gebenedeiet" (four-part chorale)
- BWV 323 – "Gott sei uns gnädig und barmherzig" (four-part chorale)
- BWV 324 – "Meine Seele erhebet den Herren" (four-part chorale)
- BWV 325 – "Heilig, heilig" (or) "Sanctus, Sanctus Dominus Deus Sabaoth" (four-part chorale)
- BWV 326 – "Herr Gott, dich loben alle wir" (four-part chorale)
- BWV 327 – "Vor deinen Thron tret ich hiermit" (four-part chorale)
- BWV 328 – "Herr Gott, dich loben wir" (four-part chorale)
- BWV 329 – "Herr, ich denk an jene Zeit" (four-part chorale)
- BWV 330 – "Herr, ich habe missgehandelt" (four-part chorale)
- BWV 331 – "Herr, ich habe missgehandelt" (four-part chorale)
- BWV 332 – "Herr Jesu Christ, dich zu uns wend" (four-part chorale)
- BWV 333 – "Herr Jesu Christ, du hast bereit'" (four-part chorale)
- BWV 334 – "Herr Jesu Christ, ich schrei zu dir" (or) "Herr Jesu Christ, du höchstes Gut" (four-part chorale)
- BWV 335 – "Herr Jesu Christ, meins Lebens Licht" (or) "O Jesu, du mein Bräutigam" (four-part chorale)
- BWV 336 – "Herr Jesu Christ, wahr' Mensch und Gott" (four-part chorale)
- BWV 337 – "Herr, nun lass in Friede" (four-part chorale)
- BWV 338 – "Herr, straf mich nicht in deinem Zorn" (four-part chorale)
- BWV 339 – "Wer in dem Schutz des Höchsten ist" (or) "Herr, wie du willt, so schicks mit mir" (four-part chorale)
- BWV 340 – "Herzlich lieb hab ich dich, o Herr" (four-part chorale)
- BWV 341 – "Heut ist, o Mensch, ein großer Trauertag" (four-part chorale)
- BWV 342 – "Heut triumphieret Gottes Sohn" (four-part chorale)
- BWV 343 – "Hilf, Gott, dass mirs gelinge" (four-part chorale)
- BWV 344 – "Hilf, Herr Jesu, lass gelingen" (four-part chorale)
- BWV 345 – "Ich bin ja, Herr, in deiner Macht" (four-part chorale)
- BWV 346 – "Ich dank dir, Gott, für deine Wohltat" (four-part chorale)
- BWV 347 – "Ich dank dir, lieber Herre" (four-part chorale)
- BWV 348 – "Ich dank dir, lieber Herre" (four-part chorale)
- BWV 349 – "Ich dank dir schon durch deinen Sohn" (four-part chorale)
- BWV 350 – "Ich danke dir, Herr Gott, in deinem Throne" (four-part chorale)
- BWV 351 – "Ich hab mein Sach Gott heimgestellt" (four-part chorale)
- BWV 352 – "Jesu, der du meine Seele" (four-part chorale)
- BWV 353 – "Jesu, der du meine Seele" (four-part chorale)
- BWV 354 – "Jesu, der du meine Seele" (four-part chorale)
- BWV 355 – "Jesu, der du selbsten wohl" (four-part chorale)
- BWV 356 – "Jesu, du mein liebstes Leben" (four-part chorale)
- BWV 357 – "Jesu, Jesu, du bist mein" (four-part chorale)
- BWV 358 – "Jesu, meine Freude" (four-part chorale)
- BWV 359 – "Jesu, meiner Seelen Wonne" (four-part chorale)
- BWV 360 – "Jesu, meiner Seelen Wonne" (four-part chorale)
- BWV 361 – "Jesu, meines Herzens Freud" (four-part chorale)
- BWV 362 – "Jesu, nun sei gepreiset" (four-part chorale)
- BWV 363 – "Jesus Christus, unser Heiland" (four-part chorale)
- BWV 364 – "Jesus Christus, unser Heiland, der den Tod überwand" (four-part chorale)
- BWV 365 – "Jesus, meine Zuversicht" (four-part chorale)
- BWV 366 – "Ihr Gestirn, ihr hohlen Lüfte" (four-part chorale)
- BWV 367 – "In allen meinen Taten" (four-part chorale)
- BWV 368 – "In dulci jubilo" (four-part chorale)
- BWV 369 – "Keinen hat Gott verlassen" (four-part chorale)
- BWV 370 – "Komm, Gott Schöpfer, Heiliger Geist" (four-part chorale)
- BWV 371 – "Kyrie, Gott Vater in Ewigkeit" (four-part chorale)
- BWV 372 – "Lass, o Herr, dein Ohr sich neigen" (four-part chorale)
- BWV 373 – "Liebster Jesu, wir sind hier" (four-part chorale)
- BWV 374 – "Lobet den Herren, denn er ist sehr freundlich" (four-part chorale)
- BWV 375 – "Lobt Gott, ihr Christen, allzugleich" (four-part chorale)
- BWV 376 – "Lobt Gott, ihr Christen, allzugleich" (four-part chorale)
- BWV 377 – "Machs mit mir, Gott, nach deiner Güt" (four-part chorale)
- BWV 378 – "Mein Augen schließ ich jetzt in Gottes Namen zu" (four-part chorale)
- BWV 379 – "Meinen Jesum laß ich nicht" (four-part chorale)
- BWV 380 – "Meinen Jesum laß ich nicht" (four-part chorale)
- BWV 381 – "Meines Lebens letzte Zeit" (four-part chorale)
- BWV 382 – "Mit Fried und Freud ich fahr dahin" (four-part chorale)
- BWV 383 – "Mitten wir im Leben sind" (four-part chorale)
- BWV 384 – "Nicht so traurig, nicht so sehr" (four-part chorale)
- BWV 385 – "Nun bitten wir den Heiligen Geist" (four-part chorale)
- BWV 386 – "Nun danket alle Gott" (four-part chorale)
- BWV 387 – "Nun freut euch, Gottes Kinder all" (four-part chorale)
- BWV 388 – "Nun freut euch, lieben Christen gmein" (four-part chorale)
- BWV 389 – "Nun lob, mein Seel, den Herren" (four-part chorale)
- BWV 390 – "Nun lob, mein Seel, den Herren" (four-part chorale)
- BWV 391 – "Nun preiset alle Gottes Barmherzigkeit" (four-part chorale)
- BWV 392 – "Nun ruhen alle Wälder" (four-part chorale)
- BWV 393 – "O Welt, sieh hier dein Leben" (four-part chorale)
- BWV 394 – "O Welt, sieh hier dein Leben" (four-part chorale)
- BWV 395 – "O Welt, sieh hier dein Leben" (four-part chorale)
- BWV 396 – "Nun sich der Tag geendet hat" (four-part chorale)
- BWV 397 – "O Ewigkeit, du Donnerwort" (four-part chorale)
- BWV 398 – "O Gott, du frommer Gott" (four-part chorale)
- BWV 399 – "O Gott, du frommer Gott" (four-part chorale)
- BWV 400 – "O Herzensangst" (four-part chorale)
- BWV 401 – "O Lamm Gottes, unschuldig" (four-part chorale)
- BWV 402 – "O Mensch, bewein dein Sünde groß" (four-part chorale)
- BWV 403 – "O Mensch, schau Jesum Christum an" (four-part chorale)
- BWV 404 – "O Traurigkeit, o Herzeleid" (four-part chorale)
- BWV 405 – "O wie selig seid ihr doch, ihr Frommen" (four-part chorale)
- BWV 406 – "O wie selig seid ihr doch, ihr Frommen" (four-part chorale)
- BWV 407 – "O wir armen Sünder" (four-part chorale)
- BWV 408 – "Schaut, ihr Sünder" (four-part chorale)
- BWV 409 – "Seelenbräutigam" (four-part chorale)
- BWV 410 – "Sei gegrüßet, Jesu gütig" (four-part chorale)
- BWV 411 – "Singt dem Herrn ein neues Lied" (four-part chorale)
- BWV 412 – "So gibst du nun, mein Jesu, gute Nacht" (four-part chorale)
- BWV 413 – "Sollt ich meinem Gott nicht singen" (four-part chorale)
- BWV 414 – "Uns ist ein Kindlein heut geborn" (four-part chorale)
- BWV 415 – "Valet will ich dir geben" (four-part chorale)
- BWV 416 – "Vater unser im Himmelreich" (four-part chorale)
- BWV 417 – "Von Gott will ich nicht lassen" (four-part chorale)
- BWV 418 – "Von Gott will ich nicht lassen" (four-part chorale)
- BWV 419 – "Helft mir Gotts Güte preisen" (or) "Von Gott will ich nicht lassen" (four-part chorale)
- BWV 420 – "Warum betrübst du dich, mein Herz" (four-part chorale)
- BWV 421 – "Warum betrübst du dich, mein Herz" (four-part chorale)
- BWV 422 – "Warum sollt ich mich denn grämen" (four-part chorale)
- BWV 423 – "Was betrübst du dich, mein Herze" (four-part chorale)
- BWV 424 – "Was bist du doch, o Seele, so betrübet" (four-part chorale)
- BWV 425 – "Was willst du dich, o meine Seele, kränken" (four-part chorale)
- BWV 426 – "Weltlich Ehr und zeitlich Gut" (four-part chorale)
- BWV 427 – "Wenn ich in Angst und Not" (four-part chorale)
- BWV 428 – "Wenn mein Stündlein vorhanden ist" (four-part chorale)
- BWV 429 – "Wenn mein Stündlein vorhanden ist" (four-part chorale)
- BWV 430 – "Wenn mein Stündlein verhanden ist" (four-part chorale)
- BWV 431 – "Wenn wir in höchsten Nöten sein" (four-part chorale)
- BWV 432 – "Wenn wir in höchsten Nöten sein" (four-part chorale)
- BWV 433 – "Wer Gott vertraut, hat wohl gebaut" (four-part chorale)
- BWV 434 – "Wer weiß, wie nahe mir mein Ende" (or) "Wer nur den lieben Gott lässt walten" (four-part chorale)
- BWV 435 – "Wie bist du, Seele, in mir so gar betrübt" (four-part chorale)
- BWV 436 – "Wie schön leuchtet der Morgenstern" (four-part chorale)
- BWV 437 – "Wir glauben all an einen Gott" (four-part chorale)
- BWV 438 – "Wo Gott zum Haus nicht gibt sein Gunst" (four-part chorale)
- BWV 439 – "Ach, dass nicht die letzte Stunde" (song/aria) (Note: Published in Schemelli's Musicalisches Gesang-Buch.)
- BWV 440 – "Auf, auf! die rechte Zeit ist hier" (song/aria)
- BWV 441 – "Auf! auf! mein Herz, mit Freuden" (song/aria)
- BWV 442 – "Beglückter Stand getreuer Seelen" (song/aria)
- BWV 443 – "Beschränkt, ihr Weisen dieser Welt" (song/aria)
- BWV 444 – "Brich entzwei, mein armes Herze" (song/aria)
- BWV 445 – "Brunnquell aller Güter" (song/aria)
- BWV 446 – "Der lieben Sonnen Licht und Pracht" (song/aria)
- BWV 447 – "Der Tag ist hin, die Sonne gehet nieder" (song/aria)
- BWV 448 – "Der Tag mit seinem Lichte" (song/aria)
- BWV 449 – "Dich bet' ich an, mein höchster Gott" (song/aria)
- BWV 450 – "Die bittre Leidenszeit beginnet abermal" (song/aria)
- BWV 451 – "Die goldne Sonne, voll Freud' und Wonne" (song/aria)
- BWV 452 – "Dir, dir Jehovah, will ich singen" (song/aria)
- BWV 453 – "Eins ist Not! ach Herr, dies Eine" (song/aria)
- BWV 454 – "Ermuntre dich, mein schwacher Geist" (song/aria)
- BWV 455 – "Erwürgtes Lamm, das die verwahrten Siegel" (song/aria)
- BWV 456 – "Es glänzet der Christen" (song/aria)
- BWV 457 – "Es ist nun aus mit meinem Leben" (song/aria)
- BWV 458 – "Es ist vollbracht! vergiss ja nicht" (song/aria)
- BWV 459 – "Es kostet viel, ein Christ zu sein" (song/aria)
- BWV 460 – "Gib dich zufrieden und sei stille" (song/aria)
- BWV 461 – "Gott lebet noch; Seele, was verzagst du doch?" (song/aria)
- BWV 462 – "Gott, wie groß ist deine Güte" (song/aria)
- BWV 463 – "Herr, nicht schicke deine Rache" (song/aria)
- BWV 464 – "Ich bin ja, Herr, in deiner Macht" (song/aria)
- BWV 465 – "Ich freue mich in dir" (song/aria)
- BWV 466 – "Ich halte treulich still und liebe" (song/aria)
- BWV 467 – "Ich lass' dich nicht" (song/aria)
- BWV 468 – "Ich liebe Jesum alle Stund'" (song/aria)
- BWV 469 – "Ich steh' an deiner Krippen hier" (song/aria)
- BWV 470 – "Jesu, Jesu, du bist mein" (song/aria)
- BWV 471 – "Jesu, deine Liebeswunden" (song/aria)
- BWV 472 – "Jesu, meines Glaubens Zier" (song/aria)
- BWV 473 – "Jesu, meines Herzens Freud" (song/aria)
- BWV 474 – "Jesus ist das schönste Licht" (song/aria)
- BWV 475 – "Jesus, unser Trost und Leben" (song/aria)
- BWV 476 – "Ihr Gestirn', ihr hohen Lufte" (song/aria)
- BWV 477 – "Kein Stündlein geht dahin" (song/aria)
- BWV 478 – "Komm, süßer Tod, komm, selge Ruh" (song/aria)
- BWV 479 – "Kommt, Seelen, dieser Tag" (song/aria)
- BWV 480 – "Kommt wieder aus der finstern Gruft" (song/aria)
- BWV 481 – "Lasset uns mit Jesu ziehen" (song/aria)
- BWV 482 – "Liebes Herz, bedenke doch" (song/aria)
- BWV 483 – "Liebster Gott, wann werd' ich sterben?" (song/aria)
- BWV 484 – "Liebster Herr Jesu! wo bleibest du so lange?" (song/aria)
- BWV 485 – "Liebster Immanuel, Herzog der Frommen" (song/aria)
- BWV 486 – "Mein Jesu, dem die Seraphinen" (song/aria)
- BWV 487 – "Mein Jesu! was für Seelenweh" (song/aria)
- BWV 488 – "Meines Lebens letzte Zeit" (song/aria)
- BWV 489 – "Nicht so traurig, nicht so sehr" (song/aria)
- BWV 490 – "Nur mein Jesus ist mein Leben" (song/aria)
- BWV 491 – "O du Liebe meiner Liebe" (song/aria)
- BWV 492 – "O finstre Nacht" (song/aria)
- BWV 493 – "O Jesulein süß, o Jesulein mild" (song/aria)
- BWV 494 – "O liebe Seele, zieh' die Sinnen" (song/aria)
- BWV 495 – "O wie selig seid ihr doch, ihr Frommen" (song/aria)
- BWV 496 – "Seelen-Bräutigam, Jesu, Gottes Lamm" (song/aria)
- BWV 497 – "Seelenweide, meine Freude" (song/aria)
- BWV 498 – "Selig, wer an Jesum denkt" (song/aria)
- BWV 499 – "Sei gegrüßet, Jesu gütig" (song/aria)
- BWV 500 – "So gehst du nun, mein Jesu, hin" (song/aria)
  - BWV 500a – "So gehst du nun, mein Jesu, hin" (variant of BWV 500 as a four-part chorale)
- BWV 501 – "So giebst du nun, mein Jesu, gute Nacht" (song/aria)
- BWV 502 – "So wünsch' ich mir zu guter Letzt" (song/aria)
- BWV 503 – "Steh' ich bei meinem Gott" (song/aria)
- BWV 504 – "Vergiss mein nicht, dass ich dein nicht" (song/aria)
- BWV 505 – "Vergiss mein nicht, vergiss mein nicht" (song/aria)
- BWV 506 – "Was bist du doch, o Seele, so betrübet" (song/aria)
- BWV 507 – "Wo ist mein Schäflein, das ich liebe" (song/aria)
- BWV 508 – "Bist du bei mir", after Gottfried Heinrich Stölzel (aria)
- BWV 509 – "Gedenke doch, mein Geist" (aria)
- BWV 510 – "Gib dich zufrieden" (chorale)
- BWV 511 – "Gib dich zufrieden" (chorale)
- BWV 512 – "Gib dich zufrieden" (chorale)
- BWV 513 – "O Ewigkeit, du Donnerwort" (chorale)
- BWV 514 – "Schaffs mit mir, Gott" (chorale)
- BWV 515 – "So oft ich meine Tobackspfeife" (aria)
  - BWV 515a – "So oft ich meine Tobackspfeife" (variant of BWV 515)
- BWV 516 – "Warum betrübst du dich" (aria)
- BWV 517 – "Wie wohl ist mir, o Freund der Seelen" (song/aria)
- BWV 518 – "Willst du dein Herz mir schenken" (song/aria)
- BWV 519 – "Hier lieg ich nun" (song/aria)
- BWV 520 – "Das walt' mein Gott" (song/aria)
- BWV 521 – "Gott mein Herz dir Dank" (song/aria)
- BWV 522 – "Meine Seele, lass es gehen" (song/aria)
- BWV 523 – "Ich gnüge mich an meinem Stande" (song/aria)
- BWV 524 – Wedding Quodlibet (fragment)
- BWV 525 – Organ Sonata No. 1 in E♭ major
  - BWV 525a (or: BWV deest) – Concerto (or: Trio Sonata) in C major for violin, cello and continuo (variant of BWV 525/1, 1032/2 and 525/3)
- BWV 526 – Organ Sonata No. 2 in C minor
- BWV 527 – Organ Sonata No. 3 in D minor
- BWV 528 – Organ Sonata No. 4 in E minor
- BWV 529 – Organ Sonata No. 5 in C major
- BWV 530 – Organ Sonata No. 6 in G major
- BWV 531 – Prelude and Fugue in C major
- BWV 532:
  - BWV 532.1 (previously **532/2a**) – Fugue in D major (early version of the fugue of BWV 532)
  - BWV 532.2 (previously **532**) – Prelude and Fugue in D major
- BWV 533 – Prelude and Fugue in E minor ("Cathedral")
  - BWV 533a – Prelude and Fugue in E minor (alternative version of BWV 533 without pedals)
- BWV 534 – Prelude and Fugue in F minor
- BWV 535 – Prelude and Fugue in G minor
  - BWV 535a – Prelude and Fugue in G minor (alternative version of BWV 535)
- BWV 536 – Prelude and Fugue in A major
  - BWV 536a – Prelude and Fugue in A major (incomplete variant of BWV 536)
- BWV 537 – Fantasia and Fugue in C minor
- BWV 538 – Toccata and Fugue in D minor ("Dorian")
- BWV 539 – Prelude and Fugue in D minor ("Fiddle"; Fugue exists in a variants for violin and for lute, see BWV 1001/2 and 1000 respectively)
- BWV 540 – Toccata and Fugue in F major
- BWV 541 – Prelude and Fugue in G major
- BWV 542 – Fantasia and Fugue in G minor ("Great")
- BWV 543 – Prelude and Fugue in A minor
  - BWV 543/1a – Prelude in A minor (early version of the prelude of BWV 543)
- BWV 544 – Prelude and Fugue in B minor
- BWV 545 – Prelude and Fugue in C major
  - BWV 545a – Prelude and Fugue in C major (early version of BWV 545)
  - BWV 545b – Prelude, Trio and Fugue in B♭ major (outer movements variant of BWV 545(a); middle movement variant of BWV 1029/3)
- BWV 546 – Prelude and Fugue in C minor
- BWV 547 – Prelude and Fugue in C major ("9/8")
- BWV 548 – Prelude and Fugue in E minor ("Wedge")
- BWV 549 – Prelude and Fugue in C minor
- BWV 550 – Prelude and Fugue in G major
- BWV 551 – Prelude and Fugue in A minor
- BWV 552 – Prelude and Fugue in E♭ major ("St. Anne") (Note: Published in Clavier-Übung III.)
- BWV 553 – Eight Short Preludes and Fugues No. 1: Prelude and Fugue in C major
- BWV 554 – Eight Short Preludes and Fugues No. 2: Prelude and Fugue in D minor
- BWV 555 – Eight Short Preludes and Fugues No. 3: Prelude and Fugue in E minor
- BWV 556 – Eight Short Preludes and Fugues No. 4: Prelude and Fugue in F major
- BWV 557 – Eight Short Preludes and Fugues No. 5: Prelude and Fugue in G major
- BWV 558 – Eight Short Preludes and Fugues No. 6: Prelude and Fugue in G minor
- BWV 559 – Eight Short Preludes and Fugues No. 7: Prelude and Fugue in A minor
- BWV 560 – Eight Short Preludes and Fugues No. 8: Prelude and Fugue in B♭ major
- BWV 561 – Fantasia and Fugue in A minor
- BWV 562 – Fantasia and Fugue in C minor (fugue unfinished)
- BWV 563 – Fantasia (and Imitatio) in B minor
- BWV 564 – Toccata, Adagio and Fugue in C major
- BWV 565 – Toccata and Fugue in D minor
- BWV 566 – Toccata and Fugue in E major (earliest extant manuscripts present this work in C major)
- BWV 567 – Prelude in C major
- BWV 568 – Prelude in G major
- BWV 569 – Prelude in A minor
- BWV 570 – Fantasia in C major
- BWV 571 – Fantasia (Concerto) in G major
- BWV 572 – Fantasia in G major (Pièce d'Orgue)
- BWV 573 – Fantasia in C major (incomplete)
- BWV 574 – Fugue in C minor (on a theme of Legrenzi)
  - BWV 574a – Fugue in C minor (alternative version of BWV 574)
  - BWV 574b – Fugue in C minor (alternative version of BWV 574)
- BWV 575 – Fugue in C minor
- BWV 576 – Fugue in G major
- BWV 577 – Fugue in G major ("à la Gigue")
- BWV 578 – Fugue in G minor ("Little")
- BWV 579 – Fugue in B minor (on a theme from Arcangelo Corelli's Op. 3, No. 4)
- BWV 580 – Fugue in D major
- BWV 581 – Fugue in G major
- BWV 582 – Passacaglia and Fugue in C minor
- BWV 583 – Trio in D minor
- BWV 584 – Trio in G minor (variant of BWV 166/2)
- BWV 585 – Trio in C minor (after Johann Friedrich Fasch)
- BWV 586 – Trio in G major
- BWV 587 – Aria in F major (after François Couperin)
- BWV 588 – Canzona in D minor
- BWV 589 – Alla breve in D major
- BWV 590 – Pastorella in F major
- BWV 591 – Little Harmonic Labyrinth
- BWV 592 – Concerto in G major, after Violin Concerto a 8 in G major by Prince Johann Ernst of Saxe-Weimar
  - BWV 592a – Concerto in G major (arrangement of BWV 592 for harpsichord)
- BWV 593 – Concerto in A minor, after Antonio Vivaldi's Concerto in A minor for two violins and strings, Op. 3 No. 8 (RV 522)
- BWV 594 – Concerto in C major, after Antonio Vivaldi's Grosso Mogul Violin Concerto in D major, RV 208
- BWV 595 – Concerto in C major (arrangement for organ of the first movement of BWV 984)
- BWV 596 – Concerto in D minor, after Antonio Vivaldi's Concerto in D minor for two violins, cello and strings, Op. 3 No. 11 (RV 565)
- BWV 597 – Concerto in E♭ major
- BWV 598 – Pedal Exercise in G minor
- BWV 599 – Nun komm, der Heiden Heiland (chorale prelude No. 1 from Orgelbüchlein)
- BWV 600 – Gott, durch deine Güte (or) Gottes Sohn ist kommen (chorale prelude No. 2 from Orgelbüchlein)
- BWV 601 – Herr Christ, der einge Gottessohn (or) Herr Gott, nun sei gepreiset (chorale prelude No. 3 from Orgelbüchlein; also in the Neumeister Collection)
- BWV 602 – Lob sei dem allmächtigen Gott (chorale prelude No. 4 from Orgelbüchlein)
- BWV 603 – Puer natus in Bethlehem (chorale prelude No. 5 from Orgelbüchlein)
- BWV 604 – Gelobet seist du, Jesu Christ (chorale prelude No. 6 from Orgelbüchlein)
- BWV 605 – Der Tag, der ist so freudenreich (chorale prelude No. 7 from Orgelbüchlein)
- BWV 606 – Vom Himmel hoch, da komm ich her (chorale prelude No. 8 from Orgelbüchlein)
- BWV 607 – Vom Himmel kam der Engel Schar (chorale prelude No. 9 from Orgelbüchlein)
- BWV 608 – In dulci jubilo (chorale prelude No. 10 from Orgelbüchlein)
- BWV 609 – Lobt Gott, ihr Christen, allzugleich (chorale prelude No. 11 from Orgelbüchlein)
- BWV 610 – Jesu, meine Freude (chorale prelude No. 12 from Orgelbüchlein)
- BWV 611 – Christum wir sollen loben schon (chorale prelude No. 13 from Orgelbüchlein)
- BWV 612 – Wir Christenleut' (chorale prelude No. 14 from Orgelbüchlein)
- BWV 613 – Helft mir Gottes Güte preisen (chorale prelude No. 15 from Orgelbüchlein)
- BWV 614 – Das alte Jahr vergangen ist (chorale prelude No. 16 from Orgelbüchlein)
- BWV 615 – In dir ist Freude (chorale prelude No. 17 from Orgelbüchlein)
- BWV 616 – Mit Fried und Freud ich fahr dahin (chorale prelude No. 18 from Orgelbüchlein)
- BWV 617 – Herr Gott, nun schleuß den Himmel auf (chorale prelude No. 19 from Orgelbüchlein)
- BWV 618 – O Lamm Gottes, unschuldig (chorale prelude No. 20 from Orgelbüchlein)
- BWV 619 – Christe, du Lamm Gottes (chorale prelude No. 21 from Orgelbüchlein)
- BWV 620 – Christus, der uns selig macht (chorale prelude No. 22 from Orgelbüchlein)
  - BWV 620a – Christus, der uns selig macht (earlier version of BWV 620)
- BWV 621 – Da Jesus an dem Kreuze stund (chorale prelude No. 23 from Orgelbüchlein)
- BWV 622 – O Mensch, bewein dein Sünde groß (chorale prelude No. 24 from Orgelbüchlein)
- BWV 623 – Wir danken dir, Herr Jesu Christ (chorale prelude No. 25 from Orgelbüchlein)
- BWV 624 – Hilf Gott, daß mir's gelinge (chorale prelude No. 26 from Orgelbüchlein)
- BWV 625 – Christ lag in Todesbanden (chorale prelude No. 27 from Orgelbüchlein)
- BWV 626 – Jesus Christus, unser Heiland (chorale prelude No. 28 from Orgelbüchlein)
- BWV 627 – Christ ist erstanden (chorale prelude No. 29 from Orgelbüchlein)
- BWV 628 – Erstanden ist der heil'ge Christ (chorale prelude No. 30 from Orgelbüchlein)
- BWV 629 – Erschienen ist der herrliche Tag (chorale prelude No. 31 from Orgelbüchlein)
- BWV 630 – Heut triumphieret Gottes Sohn (chorale prelude No. 32 from Orgelbüchlein)
- BWV 631 – Komm, Gott Schöpfer, Heiliger Geist (chorale prelude No. 33 from Orgelbüchlein)
  - BWV 631a – Komm, Gott Schöpfer, Heiliger Geist (earlier version of BWV 631)
- BWV 632 – Herr Jesu Christ, dich zu uns wend' (chorale prelude No. 34 from Orgelbüchlein)
- BWV 633 – Liebster Jesu, wir sind hier (chorale prelude No. 36 from Orgelbüchlein)
- BWV 634 – Liebster Jesu, wir sind hier (chorale prelude No. 35 from Orgelbüchlein, earlier version of BWV 633)
- BWV 635 – Dies sind die heil'gen zehn Gebot' (chorale prelude No. 37 from Orgelbüchlein)
- BWV 636 – Vater unser im Himmelreich (chorale prelude No. 38 from Orgelbüchlein)
- BWV 637 – Durch Adams Fall ist ganz verderbt (chorale prelude No. 39 from Orgelbüchlein)
- BWV 638 – Es ist das Heil uns kommen her (chorale prelude No. 40 from Orgelbüchlein)
  - BWV 638a – Es ist das Heil uns kommen her (earlier version of BWV 638)
- BWV 639 – Ich ruf zu dir, Herr Jesu Christ (chorale prelude No. 41 from Orgelbüchlein; also in the Neumeister Collection)
- BWV 640 – In dich hab ich gehoffet, Herr (chorale prelude No. 42 from Orgelbüchlein)
- BWV 641 – Wenn wir in höchsten Nöten sein (chorale prelude No. 43 from Orgelbüchlein)
- BWV 642 – Wer nur den lieben Gott läßt walten (chorale prelude No. 44 from Orgelbüchlein)
- BWV 643 – Alle Menschen müssen sterben (chorale prelude No. 45 from Orgelbüchlein)
- BWV 644 – Ach wie nichtig, ach wie flüchtig (chorale prelude No. 46 from Orgelbüchlein)
- BWV 645 – Wachet auf, ruft uns die Stimme (Schübler Chorales No. 1)
- BWV 646 – Wo soll ich fliehen hin (or) Auf meinen lieben Gott (Schübler Chorales No. 2)
- BWV 647 – Wer nur den lieben Gott läßt walten (Schübler Chorales No. 3)
- BWV 648 – Meine Seele erhebt den Herren (Schübler Chorales No. 4)
- BWV 649 – Ach, bleib bei uns, Herr Jesu Christ (Schübler Chorales No. 5)
- BWV 650 – Kommst du nun, Jesu, vom Himmel herunter (Schübler Chorales No. 6)
- BWV 651 – Fantasia super "Komm, Heiliger Geist, Herre Gott" (Great Eighteen Chorale Preludes No. 1)
  - BWV 651a – Fantasia (Präludium) super "Komm, Heiliger Geist, Herre Gott" (earlier version of BWV 651)
- BWV 652 – Komm, Heiliger Geist, Herre Gott (Great Eighteen Chorale Preludes No. 2)
  - BWV 652a – Komm, Heiliger Geist, Herre Gott (earlier version of BWV 652)
- BWV 653 – An Wasserflüssen Babylon (Great Eighteen Chorale Preludes No. 3)
  - BWV 653a – An Wasserflüssen Babylon, alio modo a 4 (earlier version of BWV 653)
  - BWV 653b – An Wasserflüssen Babylon (earlier version of BWV 653a)
- BWV 654 – Schmücke dich, o liebe Seele (Great Eighteen Chorale Preludes No. 4)
  - BWV 654a – Schmücke dich, o liebe Seele (earlier version of BWV 654)
- BWV 655 – Trio super "Herr Jesu Christ, dich zu uns wend'" (Great Eighteen Chorale Preludes No. 5)
  - BWV 655a – Trio super "Herr Jesu Christ, dich zu uns wend'" (earlier version of BWV 655)
  - BWV 655b (or: BWV deest) – Herr Jesu Christ, dich zu uns wend' (likely spurious variant of BWV 655)
  - BWV 655c (or: BWV deest) – Herr Jesu Christ, dich zu uns wend' (likely spurious variant of BWV 655)
- BWV 656 – O Lamm Gottes, unschuldig (Great Eighteen Chorale Preludes No. 6)
  - BWV 656a – O Lamm Gottes, unschuldig (earlier version of BWV 656)
- BWV 657 – Nun danket alle Gott (Great Eighteen Chorale Preludes No. 7)
- BWV 658 – Von Gott will ich nicht lassen (Great Eighteen Chorale Preludes No. 8)
  - BWV 658a – Fantasia super "Von Gott will ich nicht lassen3 (earlier version of BWV 658)
- BWV 659 – Nun komm, der Heiden Heiland (Great Eighteen Chorale Preludes No. 9)
  - BWV 659a – Fantasia super "Nun komm, der Heiden Heiland" (earlier version of BWV 659)
- BWV 660 – Trio super "Nun komm, der Heiden Heiland" (Great Eighteen Chorale Preludes No. 10)
  - BWV 660a – Nun komm, der Heiden Heiland (earlier version of BWV 660)
  - BWV 660b – Nun komm, der Heiden Heiland (variant of BWV 660)
- BWV 661 – Nun komm, der Heiden Heiland (Great Eighteen Chorale Preludes No. 11)
  - BWV 661a – Nun komm, der Heiden Heiland (earlier version of BWV 661)
- BWV 662 – Allein Gott in der Höh' sei Ehr' (Great Eighteen Chorale Preludes No. 12)
  - BWV 662a – Allein Gott in der Höh' sei Ehr' (earlier version of BWV 662)
- BWV 663 – Allein Gott in der Höh' sei Ehr' (Great Eighteen Chorale Preludes No. 13)
  - BWV 663a – Allein Gott in der Höh' sei Ehr' (earlier version of BWV 663)
- BWV 664 – Trio super "Allein Gott in der Höh' sei Ehr'" (Great Eighteen Chorale Preludes No. 14)
  - BWV 664a – Trio super "Allein Gott in der Höh' sei Ehr'" (earlier version of BWV 664)
  - BWV 664b – Trio super "Allein Gott in der Höh' sei Ehr'" (earlier sketch for BWV 664a)
- BWV 665 – Jesus Christus, unser Heiland (Great Eighteen Chorale Preludes No. 15)
  - BWV 665a – Jesus Christus, unser Heiland, in organo pleno (earlier version of BWV 665)
- BWV 666 – Jesus Christus, unser Heiland, alio modo (Great Eighteen Chorale Preludes No. 16)
  - BWV 666a – Jesus Christus, unser Heiland (earlier version of BWV 666)
- BWV 667 – Komm, Gott Schöpfer, heiliger Geist (Great Eighteen Chorale Preludes No. 17)
  - BWV 667a – Komm, Gott Schöpfer, heiliger Geist (earlier version of BWV 667)
  - BWV 667b – Komm, Gott Schöpfer, heiliger Geist (earlier sketch for BWV 667a)
- BWV 668 – Vor deinen Thron tret' ich (fragment; Great Eighteen Chorale Preludes No. 18)
  - BWV 668a – Wenn wir in höchsten Nöten sein (variant of BWV 668)
- BWV 669 – Kyrie, Gott Vater in Ewigkeit (chorale prelude: large version, i.e. with pedal)
- BWV 670 – Christe, aller Welt Trost (chorale prelude: large version)
- BWV 671 – Kyrie, Gott heiliger Geist (chorale prelude: large version)
- BWV 672 – Kyrie, Gott Vater in Ewigkeit (chorale prelude: small version, i.e. for single keyboard)
- BWV 673 – Christe, aller Welt Trost (chorale prelude: small version)
- BWV 674 – Kyrie, Gott heiliger Geist (chorale prelude: small version)
- BWV 675 – Allein Gott in der Höh' sei Ehr' (chorale prelude)
- BWV 676 – Allein Gott in der Höh' sei Ehr' (chorale prelude: large version)
  - BWV 676a – Allein Gott in der Höh' sei Ehr' (later variant of BWV 676)
- BWV 677 – Fughetta super "Allein Gott in der Höh' sei Ehr'" (chorale prelude: small version)
- BWV 678 – Dies sind die heil'gen zehn Gebot' (chorale prelude: large version)
- BWV 679 – Fughetta super "Dies sind die heil'gen zehn Gebot'" (chorale prelude: small version)
- BWV 680 – Wir glauben all an einen Gott (chorale prelude: large version)
- BWV 681 – Fughetta super "Wir glauben all an einen Gott" (chorale prelude: small version)
- BWV 682 – Vater unser im Himmelreich (chorale prelude: large version)
- BWV 683 – Vater unser im Himmelreich (chorale prelude: small version)
  - BWV 683a – Vater unser im Himmelreich (later variant of BWV 683)
- BWV 684 – Christ unser Herr zum Jordan kam (chorale prelude: large version)
- BWV 685 – Christ unser Herr zum Jordan kam alio modo (chorale prelude: small version)
- BWV 686 – Aus tiefer Not schrei ich zu dir (chorale prelude: large version)
- BWV 687 – Aus tiefer Not schrei ich zu dir (chorale prelude: small version)
- BWV 688 – Jesus Christus, unser Heiland, der von uns den Zorn Gottes wandt (chorale prelude: large version)
- BWV 689 – Fuga super "Jesus Christus, unser Heiland" (chorale prelude: small version)
- BWV 690 – Wer nur den lieben Gott läßt walten (chorale prelude from the Kirnberger collection)
- BWV 691 – Wer nur den lieben Gott läßt walten (chorale prelude from the Kirnberger collection) (Note: Appears, in whole or in part, in the Klavierbüchlein für Wilhelm Friedemann Bach.)
  - BWV 691a – Wer nur den lieben Gott läßt walten (variant of BWV 691)
- BWV 692 – Ach, Gott und Herr (chorale prelude from the Kirnberger collection)
  - BWV 692a – Ach, Gott und Herr (variant of BWV 692)
- BWV 693 – Ach, Gott und Herr (chorale prelude from the Kirnberger collection)
- BWV 694 – Wo soll ich fliehen hin (chorale prelude from the Kirnberger collection)
- BWV 695 – Fantasia super "Christ lag in Todesbanden" (chorale prelude from the Kirnberger collection)
  - BWV 695a – Fantasia super "Christ lag in Todesbanden" (variant of BWV 695)
- BWV 696 – Fughetta super "Christum wir sollen loben schon" (chorale prelude from the Kirnberger collection)
- BWV 697 – Fughetta super "Gelobet seist du, Jesu Christ" (chorale prelude from the Kirnberger collection)
- BWV 698 – Fughetta super "Herr Christ, der ein'ge Gottes-Sohn" (chorale prelude from the Kirnberger collection)
- BWV 699 – Fughetta super "Nun komm, der Heiden Heiland" (chorale prelude from the Kirnberger collection)
- BWV 700 – Vom Himmel hoch, da komm' ich her (chorale prelude from the Kirnberger collection)
- BWV 701 – Fughetta super "Vom Himmel hoch, da komm' ich her" (chorale prelude from the Kirnberger collection)
- BWV 702 – Fughetta super "Das Jesulein soll doch mein Trost" (chorale prelude from the Kirnberger collection)
- BWV 703 – Fughetta super "Gottes-Sohn ist kommen" (chorale prelude from the Kirnberger collection)
- BWV 704 – Fughetta super "Lob sei dem allmächtigen Gott" (chorale prelude from the Kirnberger collection)
- BWV 705 – Durch Adams Fall ist ganz verderbt (chorale prelude from the Kirnberger collection)
- BWV 706 – Liebster Jesu, wir sind hier (two versions; chorale prelude from the Kirnberger collection)
- BWV 707 – Ich hab' mein' Sach' Gott heimgestellt (chorale prelude from the Kirnberger collection)
- BWV 708 – Ich hab' mein' Sach' Gott heimgestellt alio modo (chorale prelude from the Kirnberger collection)
  - BWV 708a – Ich hab' mein' Sach' Gott heimgestellt (variant of BWV 708)
- BWV 709 – Herr Jesu Christ, dich zu uns wend' (chorale prelude from the Kirnberger collection)
- BWV 710 – Wir Christenleut' (chorale prelude from the Kirnberger collection)
- BWV 711 – Allein Gott in der Höh' sei Ehr' (bicinium; chorale prelude from the Kirnberger collection)
- BWV 712 – In dich hab' ich gehoffet (chorale prelude from the Kirnberger collection)
- BWV 713 – Fantasia super "Jesu, meine Freude" (chorale prelude from the Kirnberger collection)
  - BWV 713a – Fantasia super "Jesu, meine Freude" (variant of BWV 713)
- BWV 714 – Ach Gott und Herr (chorale prelude; also in the Neumeister Collection)
- BWV 715 – Allein Gott in der Höh sei Ehr (chorale prelude)
- BWV 716 – Fuga super "Allein Gott in der Höh sei Ehr" (chorale prelude)
- BWV 717 – Allein Gott in der Höh sei Ehr' (chorale prelude)
- BWV 718 – Christ lag in Todesbanden (chorale prelude)
- BWV 719 – Der Tag, der ist so freudenreich (chorale prelude; also in the Neumeister Collection)
- BWV 720 – Ein feste Burg ist unser Gott (chorale prelude)
- BWV 721 – Erbarm dich mein, o Herre Gott (chorale prelude)
- BWV 722 – Gelobet seist du, Jesu Christ (chorale prelude)
  - BWV 722a – Gelobet seist du, Jesu Christ (sketch; variant of BWV 722)
- BWV 723 – Gelobet seist du, Jesu Christ (chorale prelude)
- BWV 724 – Gott, durch deine Güte (or) Gottes Sohn ist kommen (chorale prelude)
- BWV 725 – Herr Gott, dich loben wir (chorale prelude)
- BWV 726 – Herr Jesu Christ, dich zu uns wend (chorale prelude)
- BWV 727 – Herzlich tut mich verlangen (chorale prelude)
- BWV 728 – Jesus, meine Zuversicht (chorale prelude)
- BWV 729 – In dulci jubilo (chorale prelude)
  - BWV 729a – In dulci jubilo (sketch; variant of BWV 729)
- BWV 730 – Liebster Jesu, wir sind hier (chorale prelude)
- BWV 731 – Liebster Jesu, wir sind hier (chorale prelude)
- BWV 732 – Lobt Gott, ihr Christen, allzugleich (chorale prelude)
  - BWV 732a – Lobt Gott, ihr Christen, allzugleich (sketch; variant of BWV 732)
- BWV 733 – Fuga sopra il Magnificat (chorale prelude)
- BWV 734 – Nun freut euch, lieben Christen (or) Es ist gewisslich an der Zeit (chorale prelude)
- BWV 735 – Valet will ich dir geben (chorale prelude)
- BWV 736 – Valet will ich dir geben (chorale prelude)
- BWV 737 – Vater unser im Himmelreich (chorale prelude; also in the Neumeister Collection)
- BWV 738 – Von Himmel hoch, da komm' ich her (chorale prelude)
  - BWV 738a – Von Himmel hoch, da komm' ich her (sketch; variant of BWV 738)
- BWV 739 – Wie schön leuchtet der Morgenstern (chorale prelude)
- BWV 740 – Wir glauben all' an einen Gott, Vater (chorale prelude)
- BWV 741 – Ach Gott, von Himmel sieh' darein (chorale prelude)
- BWV 742 – Ach Herr, mich armen Sünder (chorale prelude; also in the Neumeister Collection)
- BWV 743 – Ach, was ist doch unser Leben (chorale prelude)
- BWV 744 – Auf meinen lieben Gott (chorale prelude)
- BWV 745 – Aus der Tiefe rufe ich (chorale prelude)
- BWV 746 – Christ ist erstanden (chorale prelude)
- BWV 747 – Christus, der uns selig macht (chorale prelude)
- BWV 748 – Gott der Vater wohn' uns bei (chorale prelude)
  - BWV 748a – Gott der Vater wohn' uns bei (variant of BWV 748)
- BWV 749 – Herr Jesu Christ, dich zu uns wend' (chorale prelude)
- BWV 750 – Herr Jesu Christ, mein's Lebens Licht (chorale prelude)
- BWV 751 – In dulci jubilo (chorale prelude)
- BWV 752 – Jesu, der du meine Seele (chorale prelude)
- BWV 753 – Jesu, meine Freude (chorale prelude; fragment)
- BWV 754 – Liebster Jesu, wir sind hier (chorale prelude)
- BWV 755 – Nun freut euch, lieben Christen (chorale prelude)
- BWV 756 – Nun ruhen alle Wälder (chorale prelude)
- BWV 757 – O Herre Gott, dein göttlich's Wort (chorale prelude)
- BWV 758 – O Vater, allmächtiger Gott (chorale prelude)
- BWV 759 – Schmücke dich, o liebe Seele (chorale prelude)
- BWV 760 – Vater unser im Himmelreich (chorale prelude)
- BWV 761 – Vater unser im Himmelreich (chorale prelude)
- BWV 762 – Vater unser im Himmelreich (chorale prelude)
- BWV 763 – Wie schön leuchtet der Morgenstern (chorale prelude)
- BWV 764 – Wie schön leuchtet der Morgenstern (chorale prelude; fragment)
- BWV 765 – Wir glauben all' an einen Gott (chorale prelude)
- BWV 766 – Christ, der du bist der helle Tag (chorale partita)
- BWV 767 – O Gott, du frommer Gott (chorale partita)
- BWV 768 – Sei gegrüsset, Jesu gütig (chorale partita)
- BWV 769 – Canonic Variations on "Vom Himmel hoch da komm' ich her" (as published by the composer)
  - BWV 769a – Canonic Variations on "Vom Himmel hoch da komm' ich her" (manuscript variant of BWV 769)
- BWV 770 – Ach, was soll ich Sünder machen (chorale variations)
- BWV 771 – Allein Gott in der Höh' sei Ehr' (chorale variations)
- BWV 772 – Two-Part Invention No. 1 in C major
  - BWV 772a – Two-Part Invention in C major (variant of BWV 772)
- BWV 773 – Two-Part Invention No. 2 in C minor
- BWV 774 – Two-Part Invention No. 3 in D major
- BWV 775 – Two-Part Invention No. 4 in D minor
- BWV 776 – Two-Part Invention No. 5 in E♭ major
- BWV 777 – Two-Part Invention No. 6 in E major
- BWV 778 – Two-Part Invention No. 7 in E minor
- BWV 779 – Two-Part Invention No. 8 in F major
- BWV 780 – Two-Part Invention No. 9 in F minor
- BWV 781 – Two-Part Invention No. 10 in G major
- BWV 782 – Two-Part Invention No. 11 in G minor
- BWV 783 – Two-Part Invention No. 12 in A major
- BWV 784 – Two-Part Invention No. 13 in A minor
- BWV 785 – Two-Part Invention No. 14 in B♭ major
- BWV 786 – Two-Part Invention No. 15 in B minor
- BWV 787 – Sinfonia No. 1 in C major
- BWV 788 – Sinfonia No. 2 in C minor
- BWV 789 – Sinfonia No. 3 in D major
- BWV 790 – Sinfonia No. 4 in D minor
- BWV 791 – Sinfonia No. 5 in E♭ major
- BWV 792 – Sinfonia No. 6 in E major
- BWV 793 – Sinfonia No. 7 in E minor
- BWV 794 – Sinfonia No. 8 in F major
- BWV 795 – Sinfonia No. 9 in F minor
- BWV 796 – Sinfonia No. 10 in G major
- BWV 797 – Sinfonia No. 11 in G minor
- BWV 798 – Sinfonia No. 12 in A major
- BWV 799 – Sinfonia No. 13 in A minor
- BWV 800 – Sinfonia No. 14 in B♭ major
- BWV 801 – Sinfonia No. 15 in B minor
- BWV 802 – Duet in E minor
- BWV 803 – Duet in F major
- BWV 804 – Duet in G major
- BWV 805 – Duet in A minor
- BWV 806 – English Suite No. 1 in A major
  - BWV 806a – Suite in A major (variant of BWV 806)
- BWV 807 – English Suite No. 2 in A minor
- BWV 808 – English Suite No. 3 in G minor
- BWV 809 – English Suite No. 4 in F major
- BWV 810 – English Suite No. 5 in E minor
- BWV 811 – English Suite No. 6 in D minor
- BWV 812 – French Suite No. 1 in D minor
- BWV 813 – French Suite No. 2 in C minor
  - BWV 813a – French Suite No. 2 in C minor (alternative version of movement 5: Menuet)
- BWV 814 – French Suite No. 3 in B minor
- BWV 815 – French Suite No. 4 in E♭ major
  - BWV 815a – French Suite No. 4 in E♭ major (alternative versions of several movements)
- BWV 816 – French Suite No. 5 in G major
- BWV 817 – French Suite No. 6 in E major
- BWV 818 – Suite in A minor
  - BWV 818a – Suite in A minor (alternative version of BWV 818)
- BWV 819 – Suite in E♭ major
  - BWV 819a – Suite in E♭ major (alternative version of movement 1: Allemande from BWV 819)
- BWV 820 – Overture (Suite) in F major
- BWV 821 – Suite in B♭ major
- BWV 822 – Suite in G minor
- BWV 823 – Suite in F minor
- BWV 824 – Suite in A major
- BWV 825 – Partita No. 1 in B♭ major
- BWV 826 – Partita No. 2 in C minor
- BWV 827 – Partita No. 3 in A minor
- BWV 828 – Partita No. 4 in D major
- BWV 829 – Partita No. 5 in G major
- BWV 830 – Partita No. 6 in E minor
- BWV 831 – Overture in the French Style, in B minor
  - BWV 831a – Earlier version in C minor of BWV 831
- BWV 832 – Suite in A major
- BWV 833 – Prelude and Partita in F major
- BWV 834 – Allemande in C minor
- BWV 835 – Allemande in A minor
- BWV 836 – Allemande in G minor
- BWV 837 – Allemande in G minor (incomplete)
- BWV 838 – Allemande and Courante in A major
- BWV 839 – Sarabande in G minor
- BWV 840 – Courante in G major
- BWV 841 – Minuet in G major
- BWV 842 – Minuet in G minor
- BWV 843 – Minuet in G major
- BWV 844 – Scherzo in D minor
  - BWV 844a – Scherzo in D minor (alternative version of BWV 844)
- BWV 845 – Gigue in F minor
- BWV 846 – Well-Tempered Clavier, Book 1: Prelude and Fugue No. 1 in C major
  - BWV 846a – Prelude in C major (alternative version of BWV 846, only Prelude)
- BWV 847 – Well-Tempered Clavier, Book 1: Prelude and Fugue No. 2 in C minor
  - BWV 847a – Prelude in C minor (alternative version of BWV 847, only Prelude)
- BWV 848 – Well-Tempered Clavier, Book 1: Prelude and Fugue No. 3 in C♯ major
- BWV 849 – Well-Tempered Clavier, Book 1: Prelude and Fugue No. 4 in C♯ minor
- BWV 850 – Well-Tempered Clavier, Book 1: Prelude and Fugue No. 5 in D major
  - BWV 850a – Prelude in D major (alternative version of BWV 850, only Prelude)
- BWV 851 – Well-Tempered Clavier, Book 1: Prelude and Fugue No. 6 in D minor
  - BWV 851a – Prelude in D minor (alternative version of BWV 851, only Prelude)
- BWV 852 – Well-Tempered Clavier, Book 1: Prelude and Fugue No. 7 in E♭ major
- BWV 853 – Well-Tempered Clavier, Book 1: Prelude and Fugue No. 8 in E♭ minor/D♯ minor
- BWV 854 – Well-Tempered Clavier, Book 1: Prelude and Fugue No. 9 in E major
- BWV 855 – Well-Tempered Clavier, Book 1: Prelude and Fugue No. 10 in E minor
  - BWV 855a – Prelude in E minor (early version of the prelude of BWV 855) + Fughetta
- BWV 856 – Well-Tempered Clavier, Book 1: Prelude and Fugue No. 11 in F major
- BWV 857 – Well-Tempered Clavier, Book 1: Prelude and Fugue No. 12 in F minor
- BWV 858 – Well-Tempered Clavier, Book 1: Prelude and Fugue No. 13 in F♯ major
- BWV 859 – Well-Tempered Clavier, Book 1: Prelude and Fugue No. 14 in F♯ minor
- BWV 860 – Well-Tempered Clavier, Book 1: Prelude and Fugue No. 15 in G major
- BWV 861 – Well-Tempered Clavier, Book 1: Prelude and Fugue No. 16 in G minor
- BWV 862 – Well-Tempered Clavier, Book 1: Prelude and Fugue No. 17 in A♭ major
- BWV 863 – Well-Tempered Clavier, Book 1: Prelude and Fugue No. 18 in G♯ minor
- BWV 864 – Well-Tempered Clavier, Book 1: Prelude and Fugue No. 19 in A major
- BWV 865 – Well-Tempered Clavier, Book 1: Prelude and Fugue No. 20 in A minor
- BWV 866 – Well-Tempered Clavier, Book 1: Prelude and Fugue No. 21 in B♭ major
- BWV 867 – Well-Tempered Clavier, Book 1: Prelude and Fugue No. 22 in B♭ minor
- BWV 868 – Well-Tempered Clavier, Book 1: Prelude and Fugue No. 23 in B major
- BWV 869 – Well-Tempered Clavier, Book 1: Prelude and Fugue No. 24 in B minor
- BWV 870 – Well-Tempered Clavier, Book 2: Prelude and Fugue No. 1 in C major
  - BWV 870a – Prelude and Fugue in C major (alternative version of BWV 870)
  - BWV 870b – Prelude in C major (alternative version of BWV 870)
- BWV 871 – Well-Tempered Clavier, Book 2: Prelude and Fugue No. 2 in C minor
- BWV 872 – Well-Tempered Clavier, Book 2: Prelude and Fugue No. 3 in C♯ major
  - BWV 872a – Prelude and Fugue in C♯ major (alternative version of BWV 872)
- BWV 873 – Well-Tempered Clavier, Book 2: Prelude and Fugue No. 4 in C♯ minor
- BWV 874 – Well-Tempered Clavier, Book 2: Prelude and Fugue No. 5 in D major
- BWV 875 – Well-Tempered Clavier, Book 2: Prelude and Fugue No. 6 in D minor
  - BWV 875a – Prelude in D minor (alternative version of BWV 875)
- BWV 876 – Well-Tempered Clavier, Book 2: Prelude and Fugue No. 7 in E♭ major
- BWV 877 – Well-Tempered Clavier, Book 2: Prelude and Fugue No. 8 in D♯ minor
- BWV 878 – Well-Tempered Clavier, Book 2: Prelude and Fugue No. 9 in E major
- BWV 879 – Well-Tempered Clavier, Book 2: Prelude and Fugue No. 10 in E minor
- BWV 880 – Well-Tempered Clavier, Book 2: Prelude and Fugue No. 11 in F major
- BWV 881 – Well-Tempered Clavier, Book 2: Prelude and Fugue No. 12 in F minor
- BWV 882 – Well-Tempered Clavier, Book 2: Prelude and Fugue No. 13 in F♯ major
- BWV 883 – Well-Tempered Clavier, Book 2: Prelude and Fugue No. 14 in F♯ minor
- BWV 884 – Well-Tempered Clavier, Book 2: Prelude and Fugue No. 15 in G major
- BWV 885 – Well-Tempered Clavier, Book 2: Prelude and Fugue No. 16 in G minor
- BWV 886 – Well-Tempered Clavier, Book 2: Prelude and Fugue No. 17 in A♭ major
- BWV 887 – Well-Tempered Clavier, Book 2: Prelude and Fugue No. 18 in G♯ minor
- BWV 888 – Well-Tempered Clavier, Book 2: Prelude and Fugue No. 19 in A major
- BWV 889 – Well-Tempered Clavier, Book 2: Prelude and Fugue No. 20 in A minor
- BWV 890 – Well-Tempered Clavier, Book 2: Prelude and Fugue No. 21 in B♭ major
- BWV 891 – Well-Tempered Clavier, Book 2: Prelude and Fugue No. 22 in B♭ minor
- BWV 892 – Well-Tempered Clavier, Book 2: Prelude and Fugue No. 23 in B major
- BWV 893 – Well-Tempered Clavier, Book 2: Prelude and Fugue No. 24 in B minor
- BWV 894 – Prelude and Fugue in A minor
- BWV 895 – Prelude and Fugue in A minor
- BWV 896 – Prelude and Fugue in A major
- BWV 897:
  - BWV 897/1 – Prelude in A minor
  - BWV 897/2 – Fugue in A minor
- BWV 898 – Prelude and Fugue in B♭ major on the name B-A-C-H
- BWV 899 – Prelude and Fughetta in D minor
- BWV 900 – Prelude and Fughetta in E minor
- BWV 901 – Prelude and Fughetta in F major
- BWV 902 – Prelude and Fughetta in G major
  - BWV 902a – Prelude in G major (alternative version of BWV 902)
- BWV 903 – Chromatic Fantasia and Fugue in D minor
  - BWV 903a – Chromatic Fantasia in D minor (alternative version of BWV 903)
- BWV 904 – Fantasia and Fugue in A minor
- BWV 905 – Fantasia and Fugue in D minor
- BWV 906 – Fantasia and Fugue in C minor (fugue unfinished)
- BWV 907 – Fantasia and Fughetta in B♭ major
- BWV 908 – Fantasia and Fughetta in D major
- BWV 909 – Concerto and Fugue in C minor
- BWV 910 – Toccata in F♯ minor
- BWV 911 – Toccata in C minor
- BWV 912 – Toccata in D major
- BWV 913 – Toccata in D minor
- BWV 914 – Toccata in E minor
- BWV 915 – Toccata in G minor
- BWV 916 – Toccata in G major
- BWV 917 – Fantasia in G minor
- BWV 918 – Fantasia in C minor
- BWV 919 – Fantasia in C minor
- BWV 920 – Fantasia in G minor
- BWV 921 – Prelude in C minor
- BWV 922 – Prelude in A minor
- BWV 923 – Prelude in B minor
  - BWV 923a – Prelude in A minor (variant of BWV 923)
- BWV 924 – Prelude in C major
  - BWV 924a – Prelude in C major
- BWV 925 – Prelude in D major
- BWV 926 – Prelude in D minor
- BWV 927 – Prelude in F major
- BWV 928 – Prelude in F major
- BWV 929 – Trio (or) Prelude in G minor
- BWV 930 – Prelude in G minor
- BWV 931 – Prelude in A minor
- BWV 932 – Prelude in E minor (incomplete)
- BWV 933 – Six Little Preludes No. 1 in C major
- BWV 934 – Six Little Preludes No. 2 in C minor
- BWV 935 – Six Little Preludes No. 3 in D minor
- BWV 936 – Six Little Preludes No. 4 in D major
- BWV 937 – Six Little Preludes No. 5 in E major
- BWV 938 – Six Little Preludes No. 6 in E minor
- BWV 939 – Prelude in C major
- BWV 940 – Prelude in D minor
- BWV 941 – Prelude in E minor
- BWV 942 – Prelude in A minor
- BWV 943 – Prelude in C major
- BWV 944 – Fantasia and Fugue in A minor
- BWV 945 – Fugue in E minor
- BWV 946 – Fugue in C major
- BWV 947 – Fugue in A minor
- BWV 948 – Fugue in D minor
- BWV 949 – Fugue in A major
- BWV 950 – Fugue in A major on a theme by Tomaso Albinoni
- BWV 951 – Fugue in B minor on a theme by Tomaso Albinoni
  - BWV 951a – Fugue in B minor (alternative version of BWV 951)
- BWV 952 – Fugue in C major
- BWV 953 – Fugue in C major
- BWV 954 – Fugue in B♭ major on a theme by Johann Adam Reincken
- BWV 955 – Fugue in B♭ major
- BWV 956 – Fugue in E minor
- BWV 957 – Machs mit mir, Gott, nach deiner Güt (chorale prelude for organ in the Neumeister Collection, previously listed as Fugue in G major)
- BWV 958 – Fugue in A minor
- BWV 959 – Fugue in A minor
- BWV 960 – Fugue in E minor
- BWV 961 – Fughetta in C minor
- BWV 962 – Fughetta in E minor
- BWV 963 – Sonata in D major
- BWV 964 – Sonata in D minor (arrangement of Sonata No. 2 for solo violin, BWV 1003)
- BWV 965 – Sonata in A minor (after Johann Adam Reincken's Hortus Musicus, Nos. 1–5)
- BWV 966 – Sonata in C major (after Johann Adam Reincken's Hortus Musicus, Nos. 11–15)
- BWV 967 – Sonata in A minor (one movement, arrangement)
- BWV 968 – Adagio in G major (after BWV 1005/1)
- BWV 969 – Andante in G minor
- BWV 970 – Presto in D minor
- BWV 971 – Italian Concerto, in F major
- BWV 972 – Concerto in D major, after Antonio Vivaldi's Violin Concerto in D major, Op. 3 No. 9 (RV 230)
- BWV 973 – Concerto in G major, after Antonio Vivaldi's Violin Concerto in G major, Op. 7 No. 8 (RV 299)
- BWV 974 – Concerto in D minor, after Alessandro Marcello's Oboe Concerto in D minor
- BWV 975 – Concerto in G minor, after Antonio Vivaldi's Violin Concerto in G minor, RV 316, a variant of which was published as his Op. 4 No. 6 (RV 316a)
- BWV 976 – Concerto in C major, after Antonio Vivaldi's Violin Concerto in E major, Op. 3 No. 12 (RV 265)
- BWV 977 – Concerto in C major, after an unknown model
- BWV 978 – Concerto in F major, after Antonio Vivaldi's Violin Concerto in G major, Op. 3 No. 3 (RV 310)
- BWV 979 – Concerto in B minor, after Antonio Vivaldi's Violin Concerto in D minor, RV 813 (formerly RV Anh. 10)
- BWV 980 – Concerto in G major, after Antonio Vivaldi's Violin Concerto in B♭ major, Op. 4 No. 1 (RV 383a)
- BWV 981 – Concerto in C minor, after Benedetto Marcello's Concerto Op. 1 No. 2
- BWV 982 – Concerto in B♭ major, after Prince Johann Ernst of Saxe-Weimar's Concerto Op. 1 No. 1
- BWV 983 – Concerto in G minor, after an unknown model
- BWV 984 – Concerto in C major, after a lost Concerto by Prince Johann Ernst of Saxe–Weimar (see BWV 595 for organ version)
- BWV 985 – Concerto in G minor, after Georg Philipp Telemann's Violin Concerto TWV 51:g1
- BWV 986 – Concerto in G major, after an unknown model
- BWV 987 – Concerto in D minor, after Prince Johann Ernst of Saxe–Weimar's Concerto Op. 1 No. 4
- BWV 988 – Goldberg Variations (published as Fourth Clavier-Übung)
- BWV 989 – Aria variata alla maniera italiana, in A minor
- BWV 990 – Sarabande con Partite in C major
- BWV 991 – Air with variations in C minor (fragment)
- BWV 992 – Capriccio sopra la lontananza del suo fratello dilettissimo, in B♭ major
- BWV 993 – Capriccio in honorem Johann Christoph Bachii Ohrdrufiensis, in E major
- BWV 994 – Applicatio in C major
- BWV 995 – Lute Suite in G minor (transcription of Cello Suite No. 5, BWV 1011)
- BWV 996 – Lute Suite in E minor
- BWV 997 – Suite in C minor:
  - BWV 997.1 – 1st version, for Lautenwerk (lute-harpsichord)
  - BWV 997.2 – 2nd version, for lute
- BWV 998 – Prelude, Fugue and Allegro in E♭ major
- BWV 999 – Prelude in C minor
- BWV 1000 – Fugue in G minor (after BWV 1001/1)
- BWV 1001 – Violin Sonata No. 1 in G minor
- BWV 1002 – Violin Partita No. 1 in B minor
- BWV 1003 – Violin Sonata No. 2 in A minor
- BWV 1004 – Violin Partita No. 2 in D minor
- BWV 1005 – Violin Sonata No. 3 in C major
- BWV 1006:
  - BWV 1006.1 (previously **1006**) – Violin Partita No. 3 in E major
  - BWV 1006.2 (previously **1006a**) – Suite in E major (for lute?) after BWV 1006
- BWV 1007 – Cello Suite No. 1 in G major
- BWV 1008 – Cello Suite No. 2 in D minor
- BWV 1009 – Cello Suite No. 3 in C major
- BWV 1010 – Cello Suite No. 4 in E♭ major
- BWV 1011 – Cello Suite No. 5 in C minor
- BWV 1012 – Cello Suite No. 6 in D major
- BWV 1013 – Partita in A minor for solo flute
- BWV 1014 – Sonata for violin and harpsichord in B minor
- BWV 1015 – Sonata for violin and harpsichord in A major
- BWV 1016 – Sonata for violin and harpsichord in E major
- BWV 1017 – Sonata for violin and harpsichord in C minor
- BWV 1018 – Sonata for violin and harpsichord in F minor:
  - BWV 1018.1 (previously **1018a**) – early version of 3rd movement
  - BWV 1018.2 (previously **1018**) – with revised version of 3rd movement
- BWV 1019 – Sonata for violin and harpsichord in G major:
  - BWV 1019.1 (previously **1019a**, 1st version) – version in 6 movements with early versions of movements 2–5.
  - BWV 1019.2 (previously **1019a**, 2nd version) – 5 movements with revised 2nd movement and new version of 3rd movement.
  - BWV 1019.3 (previously **1019**) – version in 5 movements with new versions of movements 3–5.
- BWV 1020 – Sonata in G minor for violin and harpsichord
- BWV 1021 – Sonata in G major for violin and basso continuo
- BWV 1022 – Sonata in F major for violin and harpsichord
- BWV 1023 – Sonata in E minor for violin and basso continuo
- BWV 1024 – Sonata in C minor for violin and basso continuo
- BWV 1025 – Suite in A major for violin and harpsichord (after Sylvius Leopold Weiss):
  - BWV 1025.1 – complete version
  - BWV 1025.2 – variant: incomplete autograph
- BWV 1026 – Fugue in G minor for violin and harpsichord
- BWV 1027 – Sonata for viola da gamba and harpsichord No. 1 in G major (arrangement of BWV 1039)
  - BWV 1027a – Trio in G major for organ (arrangement of BWV 1027/4)
- BWV 1028 – Sonata for viola da gamba and harpsichord No. 2 in D major
- BWV 1029 – Sonata for viola da gamba and harpsichord No. 3 in G minor
- BWV 1030:
  - BWV 1030.1 (previously **1030a**) – Sonata in G minor for melody instrument and harpsichord (part for melody instrument lost)
  - BWV 1030.2 (previously **1030**) – Sonata in B minor for flute and harpsichord (after BWV 1030.1)
- BWV 1031 – Sonata in E♭ major for flute and harpsichord
- BWV 1032 – Sonata in A major for flute and harpsichord
- BWV 1033 – Sonata in C major for flute and basso continuo
- BWV 1034 – Sonata in E minor for flute and basso continuo
- BWV 1035 – Sonata in E major for flute and basso continuo
- BWV 1036 – Sonata in D minor for 2 violins and keyboard
- BWV 1037 – Sonata in C major for 2 violins and keyboard
- BWV 1038 – Sonata in G major for flute, violin and keyboard
- BWV 1039 – Sonata in G major for 2 flutes and basso continuo
- BWV 1040 – Canonic Trio Sonata in F major, based on material found in BWV 208
- BWV 1041 – Violin Concerto in A minor
- BWV 1042 – Violin Concerto in E major
- BWV 1043 – Concerto for 2 violins in D minor
- BWV 1044 – Concerto for flute, violin and harpsichord in A minor
- BWV 1045 – Violin Concerto movement in D major, abandoned opening movement (sinfonia) to a lost cantata
- BWV 1046 – Brandenburg Concerto No. 1 in F major for violino piccolo, three oboes, bassoon, two corni da caccia, strings and continuo
  - BWV 1046.1 (previously **1046a**, and before that **1071**) – Sinfonia in F major (early version of 1st Brandenburg Concerto)
  - BWV 1046.2 (previously **1046**) – revised version
- BWV 1047 – Brandenburg Concerto No. 2 in F major for trumpet, oboe, recorder, violin, strings and continuo
- BWV 1048 – Brandenburg Concerto No. 3 in G major for three violins, three violas, three cellos and continuo
- BWV 1049 – Brandenburg Concerto No. 4 in G major for violin, two fiauti d'echo (recorders), strings and continuo
- BWV 1050 – Brandenburg Concerto No. 5 in D major for harpsichord, violin, flute and strings:
  - BWV 1050.1 (previously **1050a**) – early version
  - BWV 1050.2 (previously **1050**) – revised version
- BWV 1051 – Brandenburg Concerto No. 6 in B♭ major for two violas, two violas da gamba, cello and continuo
- BWV 1052 – Concerto for harpsichord and strings in D minor:
  - BWV 1052.1 (previously **1052a**) – early version
  - BWV 1052.2 (previously **1052**) – revised version
- BWV 1053 – Concerto for harpsichord and strings in E major
- BWV 1054 – Concerto for harpsichord and strings in D major (after BWV 1042)
- BWV 1055 – Concerto for harpsichord and strings in A major
- BWV 1056 – Concerto for harpsichord and strings in F minor
- BWV 1057 – Concerto for harpsichord, 2 recorders and strings in F major (after BWV 1049)
- BWV 1058 – Concerto for harpsichord and strings in G minor (after BWV 1041)
- BWV 1059 – Concerto for harpsichord in D minor (incomplete, after BWV 35/1)
- BWV 1060 – Concerto for 2 harpsichords and strings in C minor
- BWV 1061 – Concerto for 2 harpsichords in C major:
  - BWV 1061.1 (previously **1061a**) – early version, without orchestral accompaniment
  - BWV 1061.2 (previously **1061**) – later version, with string orchestra accompaniment
- BWV 1062 – Concerto for 2 harpsichords and strings in C minor (after BWV 1043)
- BWV 1063 – Concerto for 3 harpsichords and strings in D minor
- BWV 1064 – Concerto for 3 harpsichords and strings in C major
- BWV 1065 – Concerto for 4 harpsichords and strings in A minor, after Antonio Vivaldi's Concerto for four violins in B minor, Op. 3 No. 10 (RV 580)
- BWV 1066 – Orchestral Suite No. 1 in C major (for woodwinds, strings and continuo)
- BWV 1067 – Orchestral Suite No. 2 in B minor (for flute, strings and continuo)
- BWV 1068 – Orchestral Suite No. 3 in D major (for oboes, trumpets, timpani, strings and continuo)
- BWV 1069 – Orchestral Suite No. 4 in D major (for oboes, bassoon, trumpets, timpani, strings and continuo)
- BWV 1070 – Orchestral Suite in G minor
- BWV 1071, renumbered as BWV 1046.1: early version of the first Brandenburg Concerto
- BWV 1072 – Canon trias harmonica a 8
- BWV 1073 – Canon a 4 perpetuus
- BWV 1074 – Canon a 4
- BWV 1075 – Canon a 2 perpetuus
- BWV 1076 – Canon triplex a 6
- BWV 1077 – Canone doppio sopr'il soggetto
- BWV 1078 – Canon super fa mi a 7 post tempus musicum
- BWV 1079 – The Musical Offering (Musikalisches Opfer)
- BWV 1080 – The Art of Fugue (Die Kunst der Fuge):
  - BWV 1080.1 – autograph version
  - BWV 1080.2 – print version (published posthumously)
- BWV 1081 – Credo intonation in F major for a Mass by Giovanni Battista Bassani (church music in Latin)
- BWV 1082 – Suscepit Israel for Antonio Caldara's Magnificat in C major (church music in Latin)
- BWV 1083 – Tilge, Höchster, meine Sünden, after Pergolesi's Stabat Mater
- BWV 1084 – "O hilf Christe, Gottes Sohn" (four-part chorale)
- BWV 1085 – O Lamm Gottes, unschuldig (chorale prelude)
- BWV 1086 – Canon concordia discors
- BWV 1087 – 14 canons on the first eight notes of the Goldberg Variations ground (discovered 1974)
- BWV 1088 – "So heb ich denn mein Auge sehnlich auf" (arioso)
- BWV 1089 – "Da Jesus an dem Kreutze stund" (four-part chorale)
- BWV 1090 – Wir Christenleut (chorale prelude from Neumeister Collection)
- BWV 1091 – Das alte Jahr vergangen ist (chorale prelude from Neumeister Collection)
- BWV 1092 – Herr Gott, nun schleuß den Himmel auf (chorale prelude from Neumeister Collection)
- BWV 1093 – Herzliebster Jesu, was hast du verbrochen (chorale prelude from Neumeister Collection)
- BWV 1094 – O Jesu, wie ist dein Gestalt (chorale prelude from Neumeister Collection)
- BWV 1095 – O Lamm Gottes unschuldig (chorale prelude from Neumeister Collection)
- BWV 1096 – Christe, der du bist Tag und Licht (or) Wir danken dir, Herr Jesu Christ (chorale prelude from Neumeister Collection)
- BWV 1097 – Ehre sei dir, Christe, der du leidest Not (chorale prelude from Neumeister Collection)
- BWV 1098 – Erhalt uns, Herr, bei deinem Wort (chorale prelude from Neumeister Collection)
- BWV 1099 – Aus tiefer Not schrei ich zu dir (chorale prelude from Neumeister Collection)
- BWV 1100 – Allein zu dir, Herr Jesu Christ (chorale prelude from Neumeister Collection)
- BWV 1101 – Durch Adams Fall ist ganz verderbt (chorale prelude from Neumeister Collection)
- BWV 1102 – Du Friedefürst, Herr Jesu Christ (chorale prelude from Neumeister Collection)
- BWV 1103 – Erhalt uns, Herr, bei deinem Wort (chorale prelude from Neumeister Collection)
- BWV 1104 – Wenn dich Unglück tut greifen an (chorale prelude from Neumeister Collection)
- BWV 1105 – Jesu, meine Freude (chorale prelude from Neumeister Collection)
- BWV 1106 – Gott ist mein Heil, mein Hilf und Trost (chorale prelude from Neumeister Collection)
- BWV 1107 – Jesu, meines Lebens Leben (chorale prelude from Neumeister Collection)
- BWV 1108 – Als Jesus Christus in der Nacht (chorale prelude from Neumeister Collection)
- BWV 1109 – Ach Gott, tu dich erbarmen (chorale prelude from Neumeister Collection)
- BWV 1110 – O Herre Gott, dein göttlich Wort (chorale prelude from Neumeister Collection)
- BWV 1111 – Nun lasset uns den Leib begrab'n (chorale prelude from Neumeister Collection)
- BWV 1112 – Christus, der ist mein Leben (chorale prelude from Neumeister Collection)
- BWV 1113 – Ich hab mein Sach Gott heimgestellt (chorale prelude from Neumeister Collection)
- BWV 1114 – Herr Jesu Christ, du höchstes Gut (chorale prelude from Neumeister Collection)
- BWV 1115 – Herzlich lieb hab ich dich, o Herr (chorale prelude from Neumeister Collection)
- BWV 1116 – Was Gott tut, das ist wohlgetan (chorale prelude from Neumeister Collection)
- BWV 1117 – Alle Menschen müssen sterben (chorale prelude from Neumeister Collection)
- BWV 1118 – Werde munter, mein Gemüte (chorale prelude from Neumeister Collection)
- BWV 1119 – Wie nach einer Wasserquelle (chorale prelude from Neumeister Collection)
- BWV 1120 – Christ, der du bist der helle Tag (chorale prelude from Neumeister Collection)
- BWV 1121 (previously BWV Anh. 205) – Fantasia in C minor for organ
- BWV 1122 – "Denket doch, ihr Menschenkinder" (four-part chorale)
- BWV 1123 – "Wo Gott zum Haus gibt nicht sein Gunst" (four-part chorale)
- BWV 1124 – "Ich ruf zu dir, Herr Jesu Christ" (four-part chorale)
- BWV 1125 – "O Gott, du frommer Gott" (four-part chorale)
- BWV 1126 – "Lobet Gott, unsern Herren" (four-part chorale)

=== Numbers above BWV 1126 ===
BWV numbers above 1126 were assigned from the first decade of the 21st century.

- BWV 1127 – Alles mit Gott und nichts ohn' ihn (strophic aria composed in 1713, rediscovered in 2005)
- BWV 1128 (**Anh. 71**) – Wo Gott der Herr nicht bei uns hält (chorale fantasia for organ authenticated in 2008)
- BWV 1129 – Theoretische Aufzeichnungen zum fünfstimmigen Satz (Regula Joh. Seb. Bachii)
- BWV 1130 – Theoretische Aufzeichnungen zum Kontrapunkt (Canones aliquot per Josephum Zarlinum)
- BWV 1131 – Regeln zum Gebrauch von Synkopen im doppelten Kontrapunkt
- BWV 1132 – Counterpoint studies with Wilhelm Friedemann Bach
- BWV 1133 – Einige höchst nöthige Regeln vom General Basse (thorough-bass rules I)
- BWV 1134 – Precepts and Principles For Playing the Thorough-Bass or Accompanying in Four Parts (thorough-bass rules II)
- BWV 1135 (**Anh. 199**) – Siehe, eine Jungfrau ist schwanger (lost cantata)
- BWV 1136 (**Anh. 209**) – Liebster Gott, vergißt du mich (lost cantata)
- BWV 1137 (**Anh. 2**) – Cantata with an unknown title, possibly Gott, du Richter der Gedanken, for the 19th Sunday after Trinity (lost, apart from a short musical sketch)
- BWV 1138 – lost Ratswahl cantatas for Mühlhausen:
  - BWV 1138.1 (**Anh. 192**) – 1709
  - BWV 1138.2 – 1710
- BWV 1139 – Wünschet Jerusalem Glück (two versions of a lost cantata):
  - BWV 1139.1 (**Anh. 4**) – for Ratswahl in Leipzig
  - BWV 1139.2 (**Anh. 4a**) – for the 200th Anniversary of the Augsburg Confession
- BWV 1140 (**Anh. 3**) – Gott, gib dein Gerichte dem Könige (lost cantata)
- BWV 1141 (**Anh. 193**) – Herrscher des Himmels, König der Ehren (lost cantata)
- BWV 1142 – Was ist, das wir Leben nennen (lost cantata)
- BWV 1143 (**244a**) – Klagt, Kinder, klagt es aller Welt (cantata, music based on BWV 198 and 244b)
- BWV 1144 (**Anh. 14**) – Sein Segen fließt daher wie ein Strom (lost cantata)
- BWV 1145 (**Anh. 211**) – Der Herr ist freundlich dem, der auf ihn harret (lost cantata)
- BWV 1146 (**Anh. 212**) – Vergnügende Flammen, verdoppelt die Macht (lost cantata)
- BWV 1147 (**Anh. 5**) – Lobet den Herrn, alle seine Heerscharen (lost cantata)
- BWV 1148 (**Anh. 15**) – Siehe, der Hüter Israel (lost cantata)
- BWV 1149 – Der Gerechte kömmt um after motet Tristis est anima mea (attributed to Kuhnau)
- BWV 1150 (**Anh. 197**) – Ihr wallenden Wolken (lost cantata)
- BWV 1151 (**Anh. 6**) – Dich loben die lieblichen Strahlen der Sonne (lost secular cantata)
- BWV 1152 (**Anh. 8**) – congratulation cantata for New Year (lost secular cantata)
- BWV 1153 (**Anh. 7**) – Heut ist gewiss ein guter Tag (lost secular cantata)
- BWV 1154 (**Anh. 194**) – O vergnügte Stunden (lost cantata)
- BWV 1155 (**Anh. 20**) – Latin ode (lost secular cantata)
- BWV 1156 (**Anh. 9**) – Entfernet euch, ihr heitern Sterne (lost secular cantata)
- BWV 1157 (**Anh. 11**) – Es lebe der König, der Vater im Lande (lost secular cantata)
- BWV 1158 (**Anh. 12**) – Frohes Volk, vergnügte Sachsen (lost secular cantata)
- BWV 1159 – Serenade (lost secular cantata)
- BWV 1160 (**Anh. 10**) – So kämpfet nur, ihr muntern Töne (lost secular cantata)
- BWV 1161 (**Anh. 13**) – Willkommen! Ihr herrschenden Götter der Erden (lost secular cantata)
- BWV 1162 (**Anh. 18**) – Froher Tag, verlangte Stunden (lost secular cantata)
- BWV 1163 (**Anh. 196**) – Auf, süß-entzückende Gewalt (lost secular cantata)
- BWV 1164 (**Anh. 159**) – Ich lasse dich nicht, du segnest mich denn (motet)
- BWV 1165 – Contributions to Keiser's Markus-Passion
- BWV 1166 – Single movements in the Passion-Pasticcio Wer ist der, so von Edom kömmt
- BWV 1167 (**Anh. 213**) – Organ concerto in F major after a lost concerto by Georg Philipp Telemann (lost)
- BWV 1168 (**Anh. 200**) – O Traurigkeit, o Herzeleid (fragment)
- BWV 1169 (**Anh. 55**) – Herr Christ, der einig Gotts Sohn
- BWV 1170 (**Anh. 77**) – Herr Christ, der einig Gotts Sohn
- BWV 1171 – Auf meinen lieben Gott (Emans 30)
- BWV 1172 – Herr Christ, der einig Gotts Sohn (Emans 85)
- BWV 1173 – Ich ruf zu dir, Herr Jesu Christ (Emans 111)
- BWV 1174 – Komm, heiliger Geist, erfüll die Herzen (Emans 122)
- BWV 1175 – Es ist das Heil uns kommen her (deest)
- BWV 1176 – Herr Christ, der einig Gottes Sohn (Emans 84)
- BWV 1177 – March in D
- BWV 1178 – Chaconne and Fugue in D minor
- BWV 1179 – Chaconne in G minor

Legend to the table
column		content
1	BWV	Bach-Werke-Verzeichnis (lit. 'Bach-works-catalogue'; BWV) numbers. Anhang (Annex; Anh.) numbers are indicated as follows: preceded by I: in Anh. I (lost works) of BWV^{1} (1950 first edition of the BWV); preceded by II: in Anh. II (doubtful works) of BWV^{1}; preceded by III: in Anh. III (spurious works) of BWV^{1}; preceded by N: new Anh. numbers in BWV^{2} (1990) and/or BWV^{2a} (1998)
2	^{2a}	Section in which the composition appears in BWV^{2a}: Chapters of the main catalogue indicated by Arabic numerals (1-13); Anh. sections indicated by Roman numerals (I–III); Reconstructions published in the NBE indicated by "R"
3	Date	Date associated with the completion of the listed version of the composition. Exact dates (e.g. for most cantatas) usually indicate the assumed date of first (public) performance. When the date is followed by an abbreviation in brackets (e.g. JSB for Johann Sebastian Bach) it indicates the date of that person's involvement with the composition as composer, scribe or publisher.
4	Name	Name of the composition: if the composition is known by a German incipit, that German name is preceded by the composition type (e.g. cantata, chorale prelude, motet, ...)
5	Key	Key of the composition
6	Scoring	See scoring table below for the abbreviations used in this column
7	BG	Bach Gesellschaft-Ausgabe (BG edition; BGA): numbers before the colon indicate the volume in that edition. After the colon an Arabic numeral indicates the page number where the score of the composition begins, while a Roman numeral indicates a description of the composition in the Vorwort (Preface) of the volume.
8	NBE	New Bach Edition (German: Neue Bach-Ausgabe, NBA): Roman numerals for the series, followed by a slash, and the volume number in Arabic numerals. A page number, after a colon, refers to the "Score" part of the volume. Without such page number, the composition is only described in the "Critical Commentary" part of the volume. The volumes group Bach's compositions by genre: 1. Cantatas (Vol. 1–34: church cantatas grouped by occasion; Vol. 35–40: secular cantatas; Vol. 41: Varia); 2. Masses, Passions, Oratorios (12 volumes); 3. Motets, Chorales, Lieder (4 volumes); 4. Organ Works (11 volumes); 5. Keyboard and Lute Works (14 volumes); 6. Chamber Music (5 volumes); 7. Orchestral Works (7 volumes); 8. Canons, Musical Offering, Art of Fugue (3 volumes); 9. Addenda (approximately 7 volumes)
9	Additional info	may include: "after" – indicating a model for the composition; "by" – indicating the composer of the composition (if different from Johann Sebastian Bach); "in" – indicating the oldest known source for the composition; "pasticcio" – indicating a composition with parts of different origin; "see" – composition renumbered in a later edition of the BWV; "text" – by text author, or, in source; Provenance of standard texts and tunes, such as Lutheran hymns and their chorale melodies, Latin liturgical texts (e.g. Magnificat) and common tunes (e.g. Folia), are not usually indicated in this column. For an overview of such resources used by Bach, see individual composition articles, and overviews in, e.g., Chorale cantata (Bach)#Bach's chorale cantatas, List of chorale harmonisations by Johann Sebastian Bach#Chorale harmonisations in various collections and List of organ compositions by Johann Sebastian Bach#Chorale Preludes.
10	BD	Bach Digital Work page

Legend for abbreviations in "Scoring" column
Voices (see also SATB)
a	A	b	B	s	S	t	T	v			V	
alto (solo part)	alto (choir part)	bass (solo part)	bass (choir part)	soprano (solo part)	soprano (choir part)	tenor (solo part)	tenor (choir part)	voice (includes parts for unspecified voices or instruments as in some canons)			vocal music for unspecified voice type	
Winds and battery (bold = soloist)
Bas	Bel	Cnt	Fl	Hn	Ob	Oba	Odc	Tai	Tbn	Tdt	Tmp	Tr
bassoon (can be part of Bc, see below)	bell(s) (musical bells)	cornett, cornettino	flute (traverso, flauto dolce, piccolo, flauto basso)	natural horn, corno da caccia, corno da tirarsi, lituo	oboe	oboe d'amore	oboe da caccia	taille	trombone	tromba da tirarsi	timpani	tromba (natural trumpet, clarino trumpet)
Strings and keyboard (bold = soloist)
Bc		Hc	Kb	Lu	Lw	Org	Str	Va	Vc	Vdg	Vl	Vne
basso continuo: Vdg, Hc, Vc, Bas, Org, Vne and/or Lu		harpsichord	keyboard (Hc, Lw, Org or clavichord)	lute, theorbo	Lautenwerck (lute-harpsichord)	organ (/man. = manualiter, without pedals)	strings: Vl I, Vl II and Va	viola(s), viola d'amore, violetta	violoncello, violoncello piccolo	viola da gamba	violin(s), violino piccolo	violone, violone grosso

Background colours
Colour	Meaning
green	extant or clearly documented partial or complete manuscript (copy) by Bach and/or first edition under Bach's supervision
yellow	extant or clearly documented manuscript (copy) or print edition, in whole or in part, by close relative, i.e. brother (J. Christoph), wife (A. M.), son (W. F. / C. P. E. / J. C. F. / J. Christian) or son-in-law (Altnickol)
orange-brown	extant or clearly documented manuscript (copy) by close friend and/or pupil (Kellner, Krebs, Kirnberger, Walther, ...), or distant family member

21st-century additions to the Bach-Werke-Verzeichnis as adopted by Bach Digital
BWV	^{2a}	Date	Name	Key	Scoring	BG	NBE	Additional info	BD
1127		1713-10-30	aria "Alles mit Gott und nichts ohn' ihn"	C maj.	s Str Bc		Sppl: 237	text by Mylius	01307
1128	II	1707–1708	chorale setting "Wo Gott der Herr nicht bei uns hält"	G min.	Organ		IV/10	after Z 4441a; was BWV Anh. 71	01725
1129		c. 1742–1745	music theory Theoretische Aufzeichnungen zum fünfstimmigen Satz				Sppl: 63		11582
1130		c. 1742–1743	music theory Theoretische Aufzeichnungen zum Kontrapunkt				Sppl: 45		11583
1131		c. 1743–1746	music theory Regeln zum Gebrauch von Synkopen im doppelten Kontrapunkt				Sppl: 41		11584
1132		c. 1736–1739	Counterpoint studies with W. F. Bach				Sppl: 67		11585
1133		c. 1740–1745	thorough-bass rules I Einige höchst nöthige Regeln vom General Basse				V/4: 131; Sppl: 37		11586
1134		1738?	thorough-bass rules II Precepts and Principles For Playing the Thorough-Bass or Accompanying in Four Parts				Sppl: 3		11587
1135	I	1724-03-25	Cantata Siehe, eine Jungfrau ist schwanger (25 March: Annunciation)					was BWV Anh. 199; text extant	01510
1136	I	1708–1717? 1725-09-09? 1727-02-06	Cantata Liebster Gott, vergißt du mich (1711: libretto for Trin. VII; 1725: Trin. XV?; 1727, with BWV 157.1: funeral in Pomßen)					was BWV Anh. 209; text by Lehms	01520
1137	I	1729-10-23?	Cantata (sketch: Gott, du Richter der Gedanken for Trinity XIX by Picander?)		SATB Vl Str Bc		III/1	was BWV Anh. 2; in SBB P 36: 18	01309
1138.1	I	1709-02-04	Cantata for Ratswahl in Mühlhausen No. 2					was BWV Anh. 192	01503
1138.2		1710-02-04	Cantata for Ratswahl in Mühlhausen No. 3					lost	11382
1139.1	I	1725-08-27	Cantata Wünschet Jerusalem Glück (council election)					was BWV Anh. 4; text by Picander; → BWV 1139.2	01311
1139.2	I	1730-06-27	Cantata Wünschet Jerusalem Glück (200th anniversary of the Augsburg Confession)					was BWV Anh. 4a; text by Picander; after BWV 1139.1	01312
1140	I	1730-08-28	Cantata Gott, gib dein Gerichte dem Könige (council election)				I/32.2	was BWV Anh. 3; text by Picander	01310
1141	I	1740-08-29	Cantata Herrscher des Himmels, König der Ehren (council election)				I/32.2	was BWV Anh. 193; text extant; /7 after BWV 208/15?	01504
1142		1716-04-02	Cantata Was ist, das wir Leben nennen (funeral service for Johann Ernst of S.-W.)					text extant	01531
1143	4.	1729-03-24	Cantata Klagt, Kinder, klagt es aller Welt (funeral of Leopold of Anhalt-Köthen; music lost but partially reconstructible)				I/34	was BWV 244a; text by Picander; ↔ BWV 198/1, /10, 244b/6, /8, /39, /49, /57, /23, /20, /65, /13, /68	00305
1144	I	1725-02-12	Cantata Sein Segen fließt daher wie ein Strom (wedding)					was BWV Anh. 14; text extant	01322
1145	I	1729-01-18	Cantata Der Herr ist freundlich dem, der auf ihn harret (wedding)					was BWV Anh. 211; text by Picander	01522
1146	I	1729-07-26	Cantata Vergnügende Flammen, verdoppelt die Macht (wedding)					was BWV Anh. 212; text by Picander	01523
1147	I	1718-12-10	Cantata Lobet den Herrn, alle seine Heerscharen (birthday of Leopold of A.-K.)				I/34	was BWV Anh. 5; text by Hunold	01313
1148	I	1724-04-27	Cantata Siehe, der Hüter Israel (doctorate)		SATB 3Tr Tmp 2Ob 3Vl Va Bc		I/34	was BWV Anh. 15; lost	01323
1150	I	1721-01-01? 1722-01-01?	Cantata Ihr wallenden Wolken (New Year)		b 2Fl Str Vc Hc Bc		I/4	was BWV Anh. 197; lost	01508
1151	I	1720-01-01	Secular cantata Dich loben die lieblichen Strahlen der Sonne (New Year)				I/35	was BWV Anh. 6; text by Hunold	01314
1152	I	1723-01-01	Secular cantata for New Year (congratulation of Leopold of Anhalt-Köthen and his wife Frederica Henriette)				I/35	was BWV Anh. 8; lost	01316
1153	I	1720-12-10	Secular cantata Heut ist gewiß ein guter Tag (birthday of Leopold of Anhalt-Köthen)				I/35	was BWV Anh. 7; text by Hunold	01315
1154	I	1722-07-29	Cantata O vergnügte Stunden (birthday of John Augustus of Anhalt-Zerbst)					was BWV Anh. 194; text extant	01505
1155	I	1723-08-09	Ode in Latin (birthday of Frederick II of Saxe-Gotha)				I/38	was BWV Anh. 20; lost	01328
1156	I	1727-05-12	Secular cantata Entfernet euch, ihr heitern Sterne (57th birthday of Augustus II)				I/36	was BWV Anh. 9; text by Haupt, C. F.; /1 → BWV 232^{II}/6?	01317
1157	I	1732-08-03	Secular cantata Es lebe der König, der Vater im Lande (name day of Augustus II)				I/36	was BWV Anh. 11; text by Picander; /1 & /11 → BWV 215/1 → 232^{IV}/1=/3; /7 → 248/39?; /9 → 212/14	01319
1158	I	1733-08-03	Secular cantata Frohes Volk, vergnügte Sachsen (name day of Augustus III)				I/36	was BWV Anh. 12; text by Picander; after BWV Anh. 18; /1 → BWV 11/1	01320
1159		1739-10-07	Secular cantata "Serenade" (birthday of Augustus III)					lost	01536
1160	I	1731-08-25	Secular cantata So kämpfet nur, ihr muntern Töne (birthday of Joachim Friedrich von Flemming)				I/39	was BWV Anh. 10; text by Picander; /1 → BWV 248^{VIa}/1?	01318
1161	I	1738-04-28	Secular cantata Willkommen! Ihr herrschenden Götter der Erden in honour of the royal couple (Augustus III and Maria Josepha), and for the forthcoming marriage of princess Maria Amalia with Charles of Sicily				I/37	was BWV Anh. 13; text by Gottsched, J. C. in Riemersche Chronik	01321
1162	I	1732-06-05	Secular cantata Froher Tag, verlangte Stunden (inauguration of St. Thomas school after renovation)				I/39	was BWV Anh. 18; text by Winckler; /1 → BWV 11/1; /1 /3 /5 /6 /8 /10 → BWV Anh. 12	01326
1163	I	1725-11-27	Secular cantata Auf, süß entzückende Gewalt (wedding of Peter, eldest son of Peter Hohmann, and Christiana Sibylla Mencke)				I/40	was BWV Anh. 196; text by Gottsched, C.; /3 → BWV 11/4 → 232^{IV}/4; /5 → BWV 11/8	01507
1164	II	1712–1713 or earlier	Motet Ich lasse dich nicht, du segnest mich denn	F min.	2SATB	39: 157	III/3: 3	by Bach, J. Christoph?; was BWV Anh. 159; ↔ BWV 421 (/2)	01470
1177		1726-12-11	March	D maj.	3Tr Tmp 2Fl 2Ob Str Bc			Introduction for BWV 207	011891
1178			Chaconne and Fugue	D min.	Organ			Composed during his pre–Weimar period; found as a copy in a pupil's hand along with BWV 1179	011965
1179			Chaconne	G min.	Organ			See BWV 1178	011966

=== BWV Anh. 1–213 ===
Appearing in the BWV Anh.:

- BWV Anh. 1 – Gesegnet ist die Zuversicht (lost cantata)
- BWV Anh. 2 → BWV 1137
- BWV Anh. 3 → BWV 1140
- BWV Anh. 4 → BWV 1139.1
- BWV Anh. 4a → BWV 1139.2
- BWV Anh. 5 → BWV 1147
- BWV Anh. 6 → BWV 1151
- BWV Anh. 7 → BWV 1153
- BWV Anh. 8 → BWV 1152
- BWV Anh. 9 → BWV 1156
- BWV Anh. 10 → BWV 1160
- BWV Anh. 11 → BWV 1157
- BWV Anh. 12 → BWV 1158
- BWV Anh. 13 → BWV 1161
- BWV Anh. 14 → BWV 1144
- BWV Anh. 15 → BWV 1148
- BWV Anh. 16 – Schließt die Gruft, ihr Trauerglocken (lost cantata)
- BWV Anh. 17 – Mein Gott, nimm die gerechte Seele (lost cantata)
- BWV Anh. 18 → BWV 1162
- BWV Anh. 19 – Thomana saß annoch betrübt (lost secular cantata)
- BWV Anh. 20 → BWV 1155
- BWV Anh. 21 – Meine Seel erhebt den Herren a.k.a. Kleine Magnificat
- BWV Anh. 22 – Concerto for Oboe and Violin in B♭ major
- BWV Anh. 23 – Concerto
- BWV Anh. 24 – Kyrie and Gloria in A minor (church music in Latin)
- BWV Anh. 25 – Kyrie–Gloria Mass in C major (church music in Latin)
- BWV Anh. 26 – Mass in C minor (church music in Latin)
- BWV Anh. 27 – Sanctus in F major (church music in Latin)
- BWV Anh. 28 – Sanctus in B♭ major (composer unknown; church music in Latin)
- BWV Anh. 29 – Mass in C minor (only continuo part extant; church music in Latin)
- BWV Anh. 30 – Magnificat in C major after Pietro Torri (church music in Latin)
- BWV Anh. 31 – "Herr Gott, dich loben alle wir" (four-part chorale)
- BWV Anh. 32 – "Getrost mein Geist, wenn Wind und Wetter krachen" (song from Sammlung Deutsche Übersetzungen und Gedichte)
- BWV Anh. 33 – "Mein Jesus, spare nicht" (song from Sammlung Deutsche Übersetzungen und Gedichte)
- BWV Anh. 34 – "Kann ich mit einem Tone" (song from Sammlung Deutsche Übersetzungen und Gedichte)
- BWV Anh. 35 – "Meine Seele lass die Flügel" (song from Sammlung Deutsche Übersetzungen und Gedichte)
- BWV Anh. 36 – "Ich stimm' itzund ein Straff-Lied an" (song from Sammlung Deutsche Übersetzungen und Gedichte)
- BWV Anh. 37 – "Der schwarze Flügel trüber Nacht" (song from Sammlung Deutsche Übersetzungen und Gedichte)
- BWV Anh. 38 – "Das Finsterniß tritt ein" (song from Sammlung Deutsche Übersetzungen und Gedichte)
- BWV Anh. 39 – "Ach was wollt ihr trüben Sinnen" (song from Sammlung Deutsche Übersetzungen und Gedichte)
- BWV Anh. 40 – "Ich bin nun wie ich bin" (song; text lost)
- BWV Anh. 41 – "Dir zu Liebe, wertes Herze" (song)
- BWV Anh. 42 – Fugue in F major
- BWV Anh. 43 – Fugue in B minor
- BWV Anh. 44 – Fugue in G Major
- BWV Anh. 45 – Fugue on B-A-C-H in B♭ major
- BWV Anh. 46 – Trio in C minor
- BWV Anh. 47 – Ach Herr, mich armen Sünder (chorale prelude)
- BWV Anh. 48 – Allein Gott in der Höh sei Ehr (chorale prelude)
- BWV Anh. 49 – Ein feste Burg (chorale prelude)
- BWV Anh. 50 – Erhalt uns, Herr, hei deinem Wort (chorale prelude)
- BWV Anh. 51 – Erstanden ist der heilge Christ (chorale prelude)
- BWV Anh. 52 – Freu dich sehr, o meine Seele (chorale prelude)
- BWV Anh. 53 – Freu dich sehr, o meine Seele (chorale prelude)
- BWV Anh. 54 – Helft mir Gotts Güte preisen (chorale prelude)
- BWV Anh. 55 – Herr Christ, der einig Gottes Sohn (chorale prelude)
- BWV Anh. 56 – Herr Jesu Christ, dich zu uns wend (chorale prelude)
- BWV Anh. 57 – Jesu, Leiden, Pein und Tod (chorale prelude)
- BWV Anh. 58 – Jesu, meine Freude (chorale prelude)
- BWV Anh. 59 – Jesu, meine Freude (chorale prelude)
- BWV Anh. 60 – Nun lob, mein Seel, den Herren (chorale prelude)
- BWV Anh. 61 – O Mensch, bewein dein Sünde groß (chorale prelude)
- BWV Anh. 62:
  - BWV Anh. 62a – Sei Lob und Ehr mit hohem Preis (chorale prelude)
  - BWV Anh. 62b – Sei Lob und Ehr mit hohem Preis (chorale prelude)
- BWV Anh. 63 – Vom Himmel hoch (chorale prelude)
- BWV Anh. 64 – Vom Himmel hoch (chorale prelude)
- BWV Anh. 65 – Vom Himmel hoch (chorale prelude)
- BWV Anh. 66 – Wachet auf, ruft uns (chorale prelude)
- BWV Anh. 67 – Was Gott tut, das ist wohlgetan (chorale prelude)
- BWV Anh. 68 – Wer nur den lieben Gott läßt walten (chorale prelude)
- BWV Anh. 69 – Wir glauben all an einen Gott (chorale prelude)
- BWV Anh. 70 – Wir glauben all an einen Gott (chorale prelude)
- BWV Anh. 71 (authenticated and renumbered to BWV 1128)
- BWV Anh. 72 – Christus der uns selig macht (chorale setting; canon for organ)
- BWV Anh. 73 – Ich ruf zu dir, Herr Jesu Christ (chorale prelude; arrangement of BWV 639 by Carl Philipp Emanuel Bach)
- BWV Anh. 74 – Schmücke dich, o liebe Seele (chorale prelude)
- BWV Anh. 75 – Herr Christ, der einig Gottes Sohn (chorale setting)
- BWV Anh. 76 – Jesu, meine Freude (chorale setting)
- BWV Anh. 77 – Herr Christ, der einig Gottes Sohn (chorale variations)
- BWV Anh. 78 – Wenn wir in höchsten Nöten sein (chorale variations)
- BWV Anh. 79 – Befiehl du deine Wege (chorale variations)
- BWV Anh. 80 – Suite in F major
- BWV Anh. 81 – Gigue in D minor (incomplete)
- BWV Anh. 82 – Ciacona in B♭ major
- BWV Anh. 83 – Ciacona in A major
- BWV Anh. 84 – Ciacona in G major
- BWV Anh. 85 – Toccata and Fugue in F minor
- BWV Anh. 86 – Fantasia in C minor
- BWV Anh. 87 – Fantasia in C major
- BWV Anh. 88 – Fugue in C Major
- BWV Anh. 89 – Fugue in C major
- BWV Anh. 90 – Fugue in C major
- BWV Anh. 91 – Fugue in G major
- BWV Anh. 92 – Fugue in G major
- BWV Anh. 93 – Fugue in E minor
- BWV Anh. 94 – Fugue in E minor
- BWV Anh. 95 – Fugue in E minor
- BWV Anh. 96 – Fugue in D major
- BWV Anh. 97 – Fugue in F♯ major
- BWV Anh. 98 – Fugue in D minor
- BWV Anh. 99 – Fugue in D minor
- BWV Anh. 100 – Fugue in D minor
- BWV Anh. 101 – Fugue in G minor
- BWV Anh. 102 – Fugue in E♭ minor
- BWV Anh. 103 – Fugue
- BWV Anh. 104 – Fugue
- BWV Anh. 105 – Fugue
- BWV Anh. 106 – Fugue
- BWV Anh. 107 – Fugue on B-A-C-H
- BWV Anh. 108 – Fugue on B-A-C-H
- BWV Anh. 109 – Fugue on B-A-C-H
- BWV Anh. 110 – Fugue on B-A-C-H
- BWV Anh. 111 – Largo and Allegro in G major
- BWV Anh. 112 – Grave in E minor
- BWV Anh. 113 – Minuet in F major
- BWV Anh. 114 – Minuet in G major
- BWV Anh. 115 – Minuet in G minor
- BWV Anh. 116 – Minuet in G major
- BWV Anh. 117a and 117b – two Polonaises in F major
- BWV Anh. 118 – Minuet in B♭ major
- BWV Anh. 119 – Polonaise in G minor
- BWV Anh. 120 – Minuet in A minor
- BWV Anh. 121 – Minuet in C minor
- BWV Anh. 122 – March in D major
- BWV Anh. 123 – Polonaise in G minor
- BWV Anh. 124 – March in G major
- BWV Anh. 125 – Polonaise in G minor
- BWV Anh. 126 – Musette in D major
- BWV Anh. 127 – March in E♭ major
- BWV Anh. 128 – [Polonaise] in D minor
- BWV Anh. 129 – Solo per il cembalo in E♭ major
- BWV Anh. 130 – Polonaise in G major
- BWV Anh. 131 – [March] in F major
- BWV Anh. 132 – Minuet in D minor
- BWV Anh. 133 – Fantasia (piece for a musical clock)
- BWV Anh. 134 – Scherzo (piece for a musical clock)
- BWV Anh. 135 – Burlesca (piece for a musical clock)
- BWV Anh. 136 – Trio (piece for a musical clock)
- BWV Anh. 137 – L'Intrada della Caccia (piece for a musical clock)
- BWV Anh. 138 – Continuazione della Caccia (piece for a musical clock)
- BWV Anh. 139 – Il Fine delle Caccia I (piece for a musical clock)
- BWV Anh. 140 – Il Fine delle Caccia II (piece for a musical clock)
- BWV Anh. 141 – Song of Psalm "O Gott die Christenhalt" (piece for a musical clock)
- BWV Anh. 142 – Psalm 110 (piece for a musical clock)
- BWV Anh. 143 – Polonaise (piece for a musical clock)
- BWV Anh. 144 – Polonaise Trio (piece for a musical clock)
- BWV Anh. 145 – March (piece for a musical clock)
- BWV Anh. 146 – March (piece for a musical clock)
- BWV Anh. 147 – La Combattuta (piece for a musical clock)
- BWV Anh. 148 – Scherzo (piece for a musical clock)
- BWV Anh. 149 – Minuet (piece for a musical clock)
- BWV Anh. 150 – Trio (piece for a musical clock)
- BWV Anh. 151 – Concerto in C major for keyboard
- BWV Anh. 152 – Concerto in G major for keyboard
- BWV Anh. 153 – Sonata in A major for violin and keyboard
- BWV Anh. 154 – Sonata in E♭ major for violin and keyboard
- BWV Anh. 155 – Concerto in A major for keyboard, strings and continuo
- BWV Anh. 156 – Herr Christ, der einge Gottes Sohn (cantata)
- BWV Anh. 157 – Ich habe Lust zu scheiden (cantata)
- BWV Anh. 158 – "Andro dall' colle al prato" (aria)
- BWV Anh. 159 → BWV 1164
- BWV Anh. 160 → BWV App. A 4
- BWV Anh. 161 – Kündlich groß ist das gottselige Geheimnis (motet movement)
- BWV Anh. 162 – Lob und Ehre und Weisheit und Dank (motet)
- BWV Anh. 163 – Merk auf, mein Herz, und sieh dorthin (motet)
- BWV Anh. 164 – Nun danket alle Gott (motet)
- BWV Anh. 165 – Unser Wandel ist im Himmel (motet)
- BWV Anh. 166 – Kyrie–Gloria Mass in E minor known as Missa super cantilena "Allein Gott in der Höh' sei Ehr"
- BWV Anh. 167 – Kyrie–Gloria Mass in G major for double SATB choir and orchestra
- BWV Anh. 168 – Kyrie and German Gloria
- BWV Anh. 169 – Erbauliche Gedanken auf den Grünen Donnerstag und Charfreitag über den Leidenden Jesum (libretto by Picander)
- BWV Anh. 170 – "Welt, ade, ich bin dein müde" (SSATB chorale)
- BWV Anh. 171 – Christ lag in Todesbanden (chorale prelude)
- BWV Anh. 172 – Herr Jesu Christ, dich zu uns wend (chorale prelude)
- BWV Anh. 173 – Invention for violin and keyboard
- BWV Anh. 174 – Invention for violin and keyboard
- BWV Anh. 175 – Invention for violin and keyboard
- BWV Anh. 176 – Invention for violin and keyboard
- BWV Anh. 177 – Prelude and Fugue in E♭ major
- BWV Anh. 178 – Toccata quasi Fantasia con Fuga in A major
- BWV Anh. 179 – Fantasia durch alle Tonarten gehend
- BWV Anh. 180 – Fugue in D minor
- BWV Anh. 181 – Fugue in A minor
- BWV Anh. 182 – Passacaglia in D minor
- BWV Anh. 183 – Rondeau in B♭ major a.k.a. "Les Bergeries"
- BWV Anh. 184 – Sonata A minor for violin and continuo
- BWV Anh. 185 – Sonata in D major for two violins and continuo
- BWV Anh. 186 – Trio Sonata in F major for two violins and continuo
- BWV Anh. 187 – Trio in F major
- BWV Anh. 188 – Sonata (Concerto) in F major for two harpsichords
- BWV Anh. 189 – Concerto in A minor for keyboard, strings and continuo
- BWV Anh. 190 – Ich bin ein Pilgrim auf der Welt (lost cantata)
- BWV Anh. 191 – Leb ich oder leb ich nicht (lost cantata)
- BWV Anh. 192 → BWV 1138.1
- BWV Anh. 193 → BWV 1141
- BWV Anh. 194 → BWV 1154
- BWV Anh. 195 – Murmelt nur, ihr heitern Bäche (lost secular cantata)
- BWV Anh. 196 → BWV 1163
- BWV Anh. 197 → BWV 1150
- BWV Anh. 198 → BWV 149/1a
- BWV Anh. 199 → BWV 1135
- BWV Anh. 200 – O Traurigkeit, o herzeleid (chorale prelude; unused sketch for the Orgelbüchlein)
- BWV Anh. 201 – Du Friedefürst, Herr Jesu Christ (four-part chorale)
- BWV Anh. 202 – Gott hat das Evangelium (four-part chorale)
- BWV Anh. 203 – Ich hebe meine Augen auf (four-part chorale)
- BWV Anh. 204 – O Traurigkeit, o Herzeleid (four-part chorale)
- BWV Anh. 205 → BWV 1121
- BWV Anh. 206 – Ach bleib mit deiner Gnade (or) Christus, der ist mein Leben (chorale prelude)
- BWV Anh. 207 – Fugue in E minor
- BWV Anh. 208 – Fugue in E♭ minor
- BWV Anh. 209 → BWV 1136
- BWV Anh. 210 – Wo sind meine Wunderwerke (lost cantata)
- BWV Anh. 211 → BWV 1145
- BWV Anh. 212 → BWV 1146
- BWV Anh. 213 – Concerto in F major for solo organ, after an unidentified concerto by Georg Philipp Telemann

=== BWV App. A–D ===
==== BWV App. A ====
- BWV App. A 4 (previously **Anh. 160**) – Jauchzet dem Herrn alle Welt (pasticcio motet)

==== BWV App. B ====
- BWV 1022
- BWV 1024
- BWV 1070

==== BWV App. C ====
- BWV Anh. 25
- BWV Anh. 113
- BWV Anh. 116
- BWV Anh. 117a
- BWV Anh. 117b
- BWV Anh. 118
- BWV Anh. 119
- BWV Anh. 120
- BWV Anh. 121
- BWV Anh. 122
- BWV Anh. 123
- BWV Anh. 124
- BWV Anh. 125
- BWV Anh. 126
- BWV Anh. 127
- BWV Anh. 128
- BWV Anh. 132
- BWV Anh. 167

==== BWV App. D ====
- BWV 1020
- BWV 1036
- BWV 1037
- BWV Anh. 24
- BWV Anh. 26
- BWV Anh. 30
- BWV Anh. 114
- BWV Anh. 115
- BWV Anh. 129
- BWV Anh. 130
- BWV Anh. 131
- BWV Anh. 183

== Sources ==
- Acta Lipsiensium Academica, Oder, Leipziger Universitäts-Geschichte (in German). Leipzig: Johann Christoph Cörner. 1723. OCLC 875373050.
- Ahlgrimm, Isolde (1969). "Cornelius Heinrich Dretzel, der Autor des J. S. Bach zugeschriebenen Klavierwerkes BWV 897" [Cornelius Heinrich Dretzel, the composer of the keyboard piece BWV 897, ascribed to J. S. Bach]. In Dürr, Alfred; Neumann, Werner (eds.). Bach-Jahrbuch 1969 [Bach Yearbook 1969]. Bach-Jahrbuch (in German). Vol. 55. Neue Bachgesellschaft. Berlin: Evangelische Verlagsanstalt. pp. 67–77. doi:10.13141/bjb.v1969.
- Bach, Carl Philipp Emanuel; Agricola, Johann Friedrich (1754). "VI. Denkmal dreyer verstorbenen Mitglieder der Societät der musikalischen Wissenschafften; C. Der dritte und letzte ist der im Orgelspielen Weltberühmte HochEdle Herr Johann Sebastian Bach, Königlich-Pohlnischer und Churfürstlich Sächsicher Hofcompositeur, und Musikdirector in Leipzig" [Bach's Nekrolog]. In Mizler, Lorenz Christoph (ed.). Musikalische Bibliothek [Musical Library] (in German). Vol. IV/1. Leipzig: Mizlerischer Bücherverlag. pp. 158–176.
- Beißwenger, Kirsten (1991). "Bachs Eingriffe in Werke fremder Komponisten: Beobachtungen an den Notenhandschriften aus seiner Bibliothek unter besonderer Berücksichtigung der lateinischen Kirchenmusik" [Bach's editing of works by other composers: observations regarding the musical manuscripts from his library, with a particular focus on Latin church music]. In Schulze, Hans-Joachim; Wolff, Christoph (eds.). Bach-Jahrbuch 1991 [Bach Yearbook 1991]. Bach-Jahrbuch (in German). Vol. 77. Neue Bachgesellschaft. Berlin: Evangelische Verlagsanstalt. pp. 127–158. doi:10.13141/bjb.v1991. ISBN 3-374-01104-7. ISSN 0084-7682.
- Beißwenger, Kirsten (1992). Johann Sebastian Bachs Notenbibliothek [Johann Sebastian Bach's musical library]. Catalogus musicus (in German). Vol. XIII. Bärenreiter. ISBN 9783761810361. OCLC 680040660.
- Blanken, Christine (2019). "Das neue Bach-Werke-Verzeichnis: Das revidierte BWV enthält Neuerkenntnisse aus 15 Jahren Bachforschung" [The new Bach-Works-Catalogue: the revised BWV contains new data from fifteen years of Bach research]. www.bach-leipzig.de (in German). Leipzig: Bach Archive. "Der inzwischen durch zahlreiche Verschiebungen unübersichtlich gewordene Anhang wird ebenfalls komplett überarbeitet (transl.: The Anhang, which in the meanwhile has become confusing because of many changes, will also be completely reworked)"
- Blaut, Stephan; Schulze, Hans-Joachim (2008). ""Wo Gott der Herr nicht bei uns hält" BWV 1128 - Quellenkundliche und stilistische Überlegungen" [Wo Gott der Herr nicht bei uns hält, BWV 1128: source-related and stylistic considerations]. In Wollny, Peter (ed.). Bach-Jahrbuch 2008 [Bach Yearbook 2008]. Bach-Jahrbuch (in German). Vol. 94. Neue Bachgesellschaft. Leipzig: Evangelische Verlagsanstalt. pp. 11–32. doi:10.13141/bjb.v2008. ISBN 978-3-374-02668-5. ISSN 0084-7682 – via Qucosa.
- Bonporti, Francesco Antonio (1712). Invenzioni [Inventions] (in Italian). Vol. Op. 10. Bologna: Giuseppe Antonio Silvani.
- Buhle, Edward, ed. (1909). Sperontes Singende Muse an der Pleisse [Sperontes's Singing muse at the Pleisse]. Denkmäler Deutscher Tonkunst: Erste Folge (in German). Vol. XXXV–XXXVI. Leipzig: Breitkopf & Härtel.
- Dadelsen, Georg von (1957). Bemerkungen zur Handschrift Johann Sebastian Bachs, seiner Familie und seines Kreises [Remarks regarding the handwriting of Johann Sebastian Bach, his family and his circle]. Tübinger Bach-Studien (in German). Vol. I. Trossingen: Hohner. OCLC 642403437.
- David, Hans T. (1961). "A Lesser Secret of J. S. Bach Uncovered". Journal of the American Musicological Society. 14 (2). American Musicological Society. University of California Press: 199–223. doi:10.2307/829757. JSTOR 829757.
- Dirksen, Pieter [in Dutch] (1998). "Zur Frage des Autors der A-Dur-Toccata BWV Anh. 178" [On the question of the composer of the Toccata in A major BWV Anh. 178]. In Schulze, Hans-Joachim; Wolff, Christoph (eds.). Bach-Jahrbuch 1998 [Bach Yearbook 1998]. Bach-Jahrbuch (in German). Vol. 84. Neue Bachgesellschaft, Bach Archive. Leipzig: Evangelische Verlagsanstalt. pp. 121–136. doi:10.13141/bjb.v1998. ISBN 3-374-01695-2. ISSN 0084-7682.
- Dirksen, Pieter [in Dutch], ed. (2010). Sonatas / Trios / Concertos (in German and English). Vol. 5. Breitkopf & Härtel. EB 8805. Series: Johann Sebastian Bach: Complete Organ Works – Urtext
- Dirksen, Pieter [in Dutch], ed. (2016). Fantasias • Fugues (in German and English). Vol. 3. Breitkopf & Härtel. EB 8803. Series: Johann Sebastian Bach: Complete Organ Works – Urtext
- Dömling, Wolfgang [in German]; Kohlhase, Thomas [in German] (1971). Federhofer, Hellmut (ed.). "Kein Bach-Autograph: Die Handschrift Brüssel, Bibliothèque Royale, II. 4093 (Fétis 2960)" [Not a Bach-autograph: The manuscript Brussels, Royal Library]. Acta Musicologica (in German). 43 (1/2). Basel: Bärenreiter: 108–109. doi:10.2307/932505. JSTOR 932505. II 4093 (Fétis 2960)
- Dürr, Alfred (1952). "Zur Echtheit einiger Bach zugeschriebener Kantaten" [On the authenticity of some cantatas ascribed to Bach]. In Schneider, Max (ed.). Bach-Jahrbuch 1951–1952 [Bach Yearbook 1951–1952]. Bach-Jahrbuch (in German). Vol. 39. Neue Bachgesellschaft. Leipzig: VEB Deutsche Musikaliendruckerei. pp. 30–46. doi:10.13141/bjb.v1952.
- Dürr, Alfred (1954). "Johann Gottlieb Goldberg und die Triosonate BWV 1037" [Johann Gottlieb Goldberg and the trio sonata BWV 1037]. In Dürr, Alfred; Neumann, Werner (eds.). Bach-Jahrbuch 1953 [Bach Yearbook 1953]. Bach-Jahrbuch (in German). Vol. 40. Neue Bachgesellschaft. Berlin: Evangelische Verlagsanstalt. pp. 51–80. doi:10.13141/bjb.v1953.
- Dürr, Alfred, ed. (1987). Eight Short Preludes and Fugues BWV 553–560: formerly ascribed to Johann Sebastian Bach (in German and English). Kassel: Bärenreiter. ISMN 9790006480098. BA 6497.
- Dürr, Alfred; Kobayashi, Yoshitake, eds. (1998). Bach Werke Verzeichnis: Kleine Ausgabe – Nach der von Wolfgang Schmieder vorgelegten 2. Ausgabe [Bach Works Catalogue: Small Edition – After Wolfgang Schmieder's 2nd edition] (in German). Kirsten Beißwenger (collaborator). (BWV^{2a} ed.). Wiesbaden: Breitkopf & Härtel. ISBN 9783765102493. "Preface in English and German."
- Dürr, Alfred; Jones, Richard D. P. (2006). The Cantatas of J. S. Bach: With Their Librettos in German-English Parallel Text. Oxford University Press. ISBN 978-0-19-929776-4.
- Eichberg, Hartwig (1976). "Unechtes unter Johann Sebastian Bachs Klavierwerken" [Inauthentic among the keyboard works of Johann Sebastian Bach]. In Schulze, Hans-Joachim; Wolff, Christoph (eds.). Bach-Jahrbuch 1975 [Bach Yearbook 1975]. Bach-Jahrbuch (in German). Vol. 61. Neue Bachgesellschaft. Berlin: Evangelische Verlagsanstalt. pp. 7–49. doi:10.13141/bjb.v1975.
- Eppstein, Hans [in German] (1966). Studien über J. S. Bachs Sonaten für ein Melodieinstrument und obligates Cembalo [Studies on J. S. Bach's Sonatas for a melody instrument and harpsichord obligato]. Studia musicologica Upsaliensia (in German). Vol. 2. Uppsala: Almqvist & Wiksell.
- Eppstein, Hans [in German] (1982). "Zur Problematik von Johann Sebastian Bachs Flötensonaten" [On the problems of Johann Sebastian Bach's flute sonatas]. In Schulze, Hans-Joachim; Wolff, Christoph (eds.). Bach-Jahrbuch 1981 [Bach Yearbook 1981]. Bach-Jahrbuch (in German). Vol. 67. Neue Bachgesellschaft. Berlin: Evangelische Verlagsanstalt. pp. 77–90. doi:10.13141/bjb.v1981. ISSN 0084-7682.
- Feder, Georg (1958). Albrecht, Hans (ed.). "Bemerkungen über einige J. S. Bach zugeschriebene Werke". Die Musikforschung (in German). 11 (1). German Musicological Society. Bärenreiter: 76–79. JSTOR 41115075.
- Forkel, Johann Nikolaus; Terry, Charles Sanford (1920). Johann Sebastian Bach: His Life, Art and Work – translated from the German, with notes and appendices. New York: Harcourt, Brace and Howe.
- Glöckner, Andreas (1983). "Die Leipziger Neukirchenmusik und das "Kleine Magnificat" BWV Anh. 21" [The music for the New Church in Leipzig and the "Little Magnificat" BWV Anh. 21]. In Schulze, Hans-Joachim; Wolff, Christoph (eds.). Bach-Jahrbuch 1982 [Bach Yearbook 1982]. Bach-Jahrbuch (in German). Vol. 68. Neue Bachgesellschaft. Berlin: Evangelische Verlagsanstalt. pp. 97–102. doi:10.13141/bjb.v1982. ISSN 0084-7682.
- Heinichen, Johann David (1728). Der General-Bass in der Composition (in German). Vol. II. Dresden.
- Hellmann, Diethard, ed. (1965). Johann Sebastian Bach: Concerto (Triosonate) für Violine, Violoncello und Basso continuo C-dur (BWV 525a) [Johann Sebastian Bach: Concerto (Trio sonata) for violin, cello and basso continuo in C major (BWV 525a)] (in German). Breitkopf & Härtel. ISMN 979-0-004-16727-4. EB 6466.
- Henning, Uta (1987). "Zur Frage des Lautenklaviers bei Johann Sebastian Bach: Mögliche Zuweisung der Bachschen Lautenkompositionen an das Lautenklavier – Beschreibung des Instruments und Rekonstruktionsversuche im 20. Jahrhundert". In Berke, Dietrich; Hanemann, Dorothee (eds.). Alte Musik als ästhetische Gegenwart: Bach, Händel, Schütz. Bericht über den internationalen musikwissenschaftlichen Kongreß Stuttgart 1985 (in German). Vol. 2. Bärenreiter. pp. 465–469. ISBN 3-7618-0767-8 – via Qucosa.
- Henrici, Christian Friedrich (a.k.a. Picander) (1725). "Erbauliche Gedanken auf den Grünen Donnerstag und Charfreitag über den Leidenden Jesum". Sammlung erbaulicher Gedancken über und auf die gewöhnlichen Sonn- und Festtage (in German). Leipzig: Boetius. pp. 293ff.
- Hoffmann, Balthasar (1738). "IX. Bey der Lob- und Trauerrede auf die verwitwete Herzoginn von Merseb. Hedwig, im Jahre 1735". In Gottsched, Johann Christoph (ed.). Der Deutschen Gesellschaft in Leipzig Oden und Cantaten in vier Büchern (in German). Vol. I. Leipzig: Bernhard Christoph Breitkopf. pp. 143–146.
- Hofmann, Klaus (1983). "Zur Echtheit der Motette „Jauchzet dem Herrn, alle Welt" BWV Anh. 160". In Rehm, Wolfgang (ed.). Bachiana et alia musicologica: Festschrift Alfred Dürr zum 65. Geburtstag am 3. Marz 1983 (in German). Bärenreiter. pp. 126–140. ISBN 3761806833.
- Hofmann, Klaus (1987). "'Wo sind meine Wunderwerke' – eine verschollene Thomasschulkantate Johann Sebastian Bachs?" [Wo sind meine Wunderwerke – a lost St Thomasschool cantata by Johann Sebastian Bach?]. In Schulze, Hans-Joachim; Wolff, Christoph (eds.). Bach-Jahrbuch 1988 [Bach Yearbook 1988]. Bach-Jahrbuch (in German). Vol. 74. Neue Bachgesellschaft. Berlin: Evangelische Verlagsanstalt. pp. 211–218. doi:10.13141/bjb.v1988. ISBN 3-374-00176-9. ISSN 0084-7682.
- Hofmann, Klaus (1999). "Ein verschollenes Kammermusikwerk Johann Sebastian Bachs: Zur Fassungsgeschichte der Orgelsonate Es-Dur (BWV 525) und der Sonate A-Dur für Flöte und Cembalo (BWV 1032)" [A lost chamber music work by Johann Sebastian Bach: On the genesis of the organ sonata in E-flat major (BWV 525) and the sonata in A major for flute and harpsichord (BWV 1032)]. In Schulze, Hans-Joachim; Wolff, Christoph (eds.). Bach-Jahrbuch 1999 [Bach Yearbook 1999]. Bach-Jahrbuch (in German). Vol. 85. Neue Bachgesellschaft, Bach Archive. Leipzig: Evangelische Verlagsanstalt. pp. 67–79. doi:10.13141/bjb.v1999. ISBN 3-374-01763-0. ISSN 0084-7682.
- Keller, Hermann (1937). "Unechte Orgelwerke Bachs" [Inauthentic Bach compositions for organ]. In Schering, Arnold (ed.). Bach-Jahrbuch 1937 [Bach Yearbook 1937]. Bach-Jahrbuch (in German). Vol. 34. Neue Bachgesellschaft. Leipzig: Breitkopf & Härtel. pp. 59–82. doi:10.13141/bjb.v1937.
- Kenyon, Nicholas (2011). The Faber Pocket Guide to Bach. Faber & Faber. ISBN 9780571272006.
- Kirnberger, Johann Philipp (1774). "(Anhang)". Die Kunst des reinen Satzes in der Musik (in German). Vol. I. pp. I–VI.
- Kirnberger, Johann Philipp (1780). "Præludium". Diverses Pièces pour le Clavecin (in French). J. J. Hummel. p. 16.
- Kobayashi, Yoshitake (1978). "Neuerkenntnisse zu einigen Bach-Quellen an Hand schriftkundlicher Untersuchungen" [New acknowledgements regarding some Bach-sources based on handwriting research]. In Schulze, Hans-Joachim; Wolff, Christoph (eds.). Bach-Jahrbuch 1978 [Bach Yearbook 1978]. Bach-Jahrbuch (in German). Vol. 64. Neue Bachgesellschaft. Berlin: Evangelische Verlagsanstalt. pp. 43–60. doi:10.13141/bjb.v1978.
- Koska, Bernd (2011). "Bach oder Dobenecker? Zur Frage der Autorschaft von BWV Anh. 85 und 101" [Bach or Dobenecker? On the authorship question of BWV Anh. 85 and 101]. In Wollny, Peter (ed.). Bach-Jahrbuch 2011 [Bach Yearbook 2011]. Bach-Jahrbuch (in German). Vol. 97. Neue Bachgesellschaft. Leipzig: Evangelische Verlagsanstalt. pp. 259–263. doi:10.13141/bjb.v2011. ISBN 978-3-374-02986-0. ISSN 0084-7682.
- Kretzschmar, Hermann (1910). "Das Notenbuch der Zeumerin" [The notebook of the Zeumerin]. Jahrbuch der Musikbibliothek Peters für 1909 [Yearbook of the musiclibrary Peters for 1909]. Jahrbuch der Musikbibliothek Peters (in German). Vol. 16. Musikbibliothek Peters. Leipzig: C. F. Peters. pp. 57–72.
- Kuznik, Joel H. (December 2008). "BWV 1128: A recently discovered Bach organ work" (PDF). The Diapason. 99 (22): 22–23. HTML version (without illustrations)
- Landmann, Arno (1907). "Angeblich von J. S. Bach komponierte Oden von Chr. H. von Hoffmannswaldau" [Likely by J. S. Bach composed odes of Chr. H. von Hoffmannswaldau]. In Schering, Arnold (ed.). Bach-Jahrbuch 1907 [Bach Yearbook 1907]. Bach-Jahrbuch (in German). Vol. 4. Neue Bachgesellschaft. Breitkopf & Härtel. pp. 79–88. doi:10.13141/bjb.v1907.
- Leisinger, Ulrich; Wollny, Peter (1993). "'Altes Zeug von mir': Carl Philipp Emanuel Bachs kompositorisches Schaffen vor 1740" ['Old stuff for me': Carl Philipp Emanuel Bach's compositorial activities before 1740]. In Schulze, Hans-Joachim; Wolff, Christoph (eds.). Bach-Jahrbuch 1993 [Bach Yearbook 1993]. Bach-Jahrbuch (in German). Vol. 79. Neue Bachgesellschaft. Leipzig: Evangelische Verlagsanstalt. pp. 127–204. doi:10.13141/bjb.v1993. ISBN 3-374-01516-6. ISSN 0084-7682.
- Maul, Michael (2005). ""Alles mit Gott und nicht ohn' ihn" – Eine neu aufgefundene Aria von Johann Sebastian Bach". In Wollny, Peter (ed.). Bach-Jahrbuch 2005 [Bach Yearbook 2008]. Bach-Jahrbuch (in German). Vol. 91. Neue Bachgesellschaft. Leipzig: Evangelische Verlagsanstalt. pp. 7–34. doi:10.13141/bjb.v2005. ISBN 3-374-02301-0. ISSN 0084-7682.
- Meiningen 1704: Sonn- und Fest-Andachten Uber die ordentlichen Evangelia Aus gewissen Biblischen Texten Alten und Neuen Testaments Und In der Hoch-Fürstl. Sachs. Meining. Hof-Capell Der Heil. Dreyfaltigkeit Deroselben zu Ehren abgesungen (in German). Meiningen. 1704.
- Melamed, Daniel R. (1988). "The Authorship of the Motet Ich lasse dich nicht (BWV Anh. 159)". Journal of the American Musicological Society. 41 (3). American Musicological Society. University of California Press: 491–526. doi:10.2307/831462. JSTOR 831462.
- Melamed, Daniel R. (1995). J. S. Bach and the German Motet. Cambridge University Press. ISBN 9780521418645.
- Morana, Frank (1993). "The 'Dobenecker' Toccata, BWV-Anh. II 85: An Early Bach Work?". Bach. 24 (2). Berea, Ohio: Riemenschneider Bach Institute: 26–37. ISSN 0005-3600. JSTOR 41640382.
- Neemann, Hans [at Wikidata] (1931). "J. S. Bachs Lautenkompositionen" [J. S. Bach's lute compositions]. In Schering, Arnold (ed.). Bach-Jahrbuch 1931 [Bach-Yearbook 1931]. Bach-Jahrbuch (in German). Vol. 28. Leipzig: Breitkopf & Härtel. pp. 72–87. doi:10.13141/bjb.v1931 – via Qucosa.
- Perreault, Jean M. (2004). Fitch, Donna K. (ed.). The Thematic Catalogue of the Musical Works of Johann Pachelbel. Lanham, Maryland: Scarecrow Press. ISBN 0-8108-4970-4.
- Pfau, Marc-Roderich (2008). "Ein unbekanntes Leipziger Kantatentextheft aus dem Jahr 1735: Neues zum Thema Bach und Stölzel" [An unknown Leipzig cantata text publication from the year 1735: News regarding Bach and Stölzel]. In Wollny, Peter (ed.). Bach-Jahrbuch 2008 [Bach Yearbook 2008]. Bach-Jahrbuch (in German). Vol. 94. Neue Bachgesellschaft. Leipzig: Evangelische Verlagsanstalt. pp. 99–122. doi:10.13141/bjb.v2008. ISBN 978-3-374-02668-5. ISSN 0084-7682.
- Platen, Emil (1976). "Zur Echtheit einiger Choralsätze Johann Sebastian Bachs" [On the authenticity of some of Johann Sebastian Bach's chorale settings]. In Schulze, Hans-Joachim; Wolff, Christoph (eds.). Bach-Jahrbuch 1975 [Bach Yearbook 1975]. Bach-Jahrbuch (in German). Vol. 61. Neue Bachgesellschaft. Berlin: Evangelische Verlagsanstalt. pp. 50–62. doi:10.13141/bjb.v1975.
- Scheide, William H. [in German] (1960). "Johann Sebastian Bachs Sammlung von Kantaten seines Vetters Johann Ludwig Bach" [Johann Sebastian Bach's collection of cantatas by his cousin Johann Ludwig Bach]. In Dürr, Alfred; Neumann, Werner (eds.). Bach-Jahrbuch 1959 [Bach Yearbook 1959]. Bach-Jahrbuch (in German). Vol. 46. Neue Bachgesellschaft. Berlin: Evangelische Verlagsanstalt. pp. 52–94. doi:10.13141/bjb.v1959.
- Schicht, Johann Gottfried, ed. (1805). Messa a 8 voci reali e 4 ripiene coll'accompagnamento di due Orchestre, composta da Giov. Sebast. Bach: Partitura, copiata dalla partitura autografa dell' Autore [Mass in eight real voices and four additional voices, accompanied by two Orchestras, composed by Joh. Sebast. Bach: Score, copied from the autograph score of the Author] (in Italian and Latin). Leipzig: Breitkopf & Härtel. Harvard Digital Collections.
- Schmieder, Wolfgang, ed. (1950). Thematisch-systematisches Verzeichnis der musikalischen Werke von Johann Sebastian Bach: Bach-Werke-Verzeichnis [Thematic-Systematic Catalogue of the Musical Works of Johann Sebastian Bach: Bach-Works-Catalogue] (in German) (BWV^{1} ed.). Leipzig: Breitkopf & Härtel. OCLC 963027464. "Unaltered up unto its eighth printing in 1986."
- Schmieder, Wolfgang, ed. (1990). Thematisch-systematisches Verzeichnis der musikalischen Werke von Johann Sebastian Bach: Bach-Werke-Verzeichnis – 2. überarbeitete und erweiterte Ausgabe [Thematic-Systematic Catalogue of the Musical Works of Johann Sebastian Bach: Bach-Works-Catalogue – 2nd reworked and enlarged edition] (in German) (BWV^{2} ed.). Wiesbaden: Breitkopf & Härtel. ISBN 9783765102554.
- Schneider, Max (1907). "Thematisches Verzeichnis der musikalischen Werke der Familie Bach (I. Teil)" [Thematic catalogue of compositions by the Bach family (Part I)]. In Schering, Arnold (ed.). Bach-Jahrbuch 1907 [Bach Yearbook 1907]. Bach-Jahrbuch (in German). Vol. 4. Neue Bachgesellschaft. Breitkopf & Härtel. pp. 103–177. doi:10.13141/bjb.v1907.
- Schneider, Max (1912). "Zur Lukaspassion" [On the St Luke Passion]. In Schering, Arnold (ed.). Bach-Jahrbuch 1911 [Bach Yearbook 1911]. Bach-Jahrbuch (in German). Vol. 8. Neue Bachgesellschaft. Breitkopf & Härtel. pp. 105–108. doi:10.13141/bjb.v1911.
- Scholze, Johann Sigismund (a.k.a. Sperontes) (1736). Singende Muse an der Pleiße [Singing muse at the Pleiße] (in German). Vol. I. Leipzig.
- Schulenberg, David [in French] (2010). "An Enigmatic Legacy: Two Instrumental Works Attributed to Wilhelm Friedemann Bach". Bach. 41 (2). Berea, Ohio: Riemenschneider Bach Institute: 24–60. ISSN 0005-3600. JSTOR 41640603.
- Schulenberg, David [in French], ed. (2013). Preludes and Fugues I (in German and English). Vol. 1. Breitkopf & Härtel. EB 8801. Series: Johann Sebastian Bach: Complete Organ Works – Urtext
- Schulze, Hans-Joachim (1980). "Ein 'Dresdner Menuett' im zweiten Klavierbüchlein der Anna Magdalena Bach: Nebst Hinweisen zur Überlieferung einiger Kammermusikwerke Bachs" [A Minuet from Dresden in the second keyboard booklet of Anna Magdalena Bach: Further, indications regarding the transmission of some of Bach's chamber music compositions]. In Schulze, Hans-Joachim; Wolff, Christoph (eds.). Bach-Jahrbuch 1979 [Bach Yearbook 1979]. Bach-Jahrbuch (in German). Vol. 65. Neue Bachgesellschaft. Berlin: Evangelische Verlagsanstalt. pp. 45–64. doi:10.13141/bjb.v1979.
- Schulze, Hans-Joachim (1983). ""150 Stücke von den Bachischen Erben": Zur Überlieferung der vierstimmigen Choräle Johann Sebastian Bachs" ["150 pieces from the Bach estate": on the transmission of Johann Sebastian Bach's four-part chorales]. In Schulze, Hans-Joachim; Wolff, Christoph (eds.). Bach-Jahrbuch 1983 [Bach Yearbook 1983]. Bach-Jahrbuch (in German). Vol. 69. Neue Bachgesellschaft. Berlin: Evangelische Verlagsanstalt. pp. 81–100. doi:10.13141/bjb.v1983. ISSN 0084-7682.
- Schulze, Hans-Joachim (1984). Studien zur Bach-Überlieferung im 18. Jahrhundert [Studies of the Bach-transmission in the 18th century] (in German). Peters. ISBN 3-87626-095-7. EP 9346.
- Siegele, Ulrich (1957). "Noch einmal: Die Violinsonate BWV 1024" [Yet again: The violin sonata BWV 1024]. In Dürr, Alfred; Neumann, Werner (eds.). Bach-Jahrbuch 1956 [Bach Yearbook 1956]. Bach-Jahrbuch (in German). Vol. 43. Neue Bachgesellschaft. Berlin: Evangelische Verlagsanstalt. pp. 124–139. doi:10.13141/bjb.v1956.
- Spitta, Philipp (1899). Johann Sebastian Bach: His Work and Influence on the Music of Germany, 1685–1750. Translated by Bell, Clara; Fuller Maitland, John Alexander. Novello & Co. Volumes: I – II – III
- Spitta, Philipp (1894). "Sperontes' Singende Muse an der Pleisse: Zur Geschichte des deutschen Hausgesanges im achtzehnten Jahrhundert" [Sperontes's Singende Muse an der Pleisse: On the history of German singing-at-home in the 18th century]. Musikgeschichtliche Aufsätze [Essays on music history] (in German). Berlin: Paetel. pp. 175ff.
- Thielemann, Arne (2012). "Zur Identifizierung des Magnificats BWV Anh. 30 aus Johann Sebastian Bachs Notenbibliothek" [On the identification of the Magnificat BWV Anh. 30 from Johann Sebastian Bach's music library]. In Wollny, Peter (ed.). Bach-Jahrbuch 2012 [Bach Yearbook 2012]. Bach-Jahrbuch (in German). Vol. 98. Neue Bachgesellschaft. Leipzig: Evangelische Verlagsanstalt. pp. 217–224. doi:10.13141/bjb.v2012. ISBN 978-3-374-02668-5. ISSN 0084-7682.
- Tittel, Karl (1966). "Welche unter J. S. Bachs Namen geführten Orgelwerke sind Johann Tobias bzw. Johann Ludwig Krebs zuzuschreiben? Ein Versuch zur Lösung von Autorschaftsproblemen" [Which of the organ works for which J. S. Bach has been named as author can be ascribed to Johann Tobias or Johann Ludwig Krebs? An attempt to resolve authorship issues]. In Dürr, Alfred; Neumann, Werner (eds.). Bach-Jahrbuch 1966 [Bach Yearbook 1966]. Bach-Jahrbuch (in German). Vol. 52. Neue Bachgesellschaft. Berlin: Evangelische Verlagsanstalt. pp. 102–137. doi:10.13141/bjb.v1966.
- Torri, Pietro (2013). Thielemann, Arne (ed.). Magnificat in C: BWV Anh. 30. Stuttgarter Bach-Ausgaben. Vol. Full score. Bach, Johann Sebastian (arranger); Horn, Paul (basso continuo realization). Stuttgart: Carus. 35.012.
- "US-NHub Music Deposit 31 (Klavierbüchlein für W. F. Bach)". Bach Digital. Leipzig: Bach Archive; et al. 2020-03-03.
- van Leyden, Rolf (1956). "Die Violinsonate BWV 1024" [The violin sonata BWV 1024]. In Dürr, Alfred; Neumann, Werner (eds.). Bach-Jahrbuch 1955 [Bach Yearbook 1955]. Bach-Jahrbuch (in German). Vol. 42. Neue Bachgesellschaft. Berlin: Evangelische Verlagsanstalt. pp. 73–102. doi:10.13141/bjb.v1955.
- Vetter, Daniel (1713). Musicalische Kirch- und Hauß-Ergötzlichkeit (in German). Vol. 2. Leipzig. OCLC 857536916.
- Williams, Peter (2003). The Organ Music of J. S. Bach. Cambridge University Press. ISBN 978-0-521-89115-8.
- Wollny, Peter (2015). "Vom „apparat der auserleßensten kirchen Stücke" zum „Vorrath an Musicalien, von J. S. Bach und andern berühmten Musicis": Quellenkundliche Ermittlungen zur frühen Thüringer Bach-Überlieferung und zu einigen Weimarer Schülern und Kollegen Bachs". Bach-Jahrbuch 2015 [Bach Yearbook 2015]. Bach-Jahrbuch (in German). Vol. 101. Neue Bachgesellschaft. Leipzig: Evangelische Verlagsanstalt. ISBN 978-3-374-04320-0. ISSN 0084-7682.
- Wright, Craig (2000). "Bachs Kleines harmonisches Labyrinth (BWV 591): Echtheitsfragen und theologischer Hintergrund" [Bach's Little Harmonical Labyrinth (BWV 591): Authenticity issues and theological background]. In Schulze, Hans-Joachim; Wolff, Christoph (eds.). Bach-Jahrbuch 2000 [Bach Yearbook 2000]. Bach-Jahrbuch (in German). Vol. 86. Translated by Steinwachs, Barbara. Neue Bachgesellschaft. Leipzig: Evangelische Verlagsanstalt. pp. 51–65. doi:10.13141/bjb.v2000. ISBN 3-374-01828-9. ISSN 0084-7682.
- Zuccari, Carlo (c. 1747). "Sonata X" [Sonata No. 10]. Sonate a Violino, e Basso ò Cembalo: Opera Prima [Sonatas for violin, and bass or harpsichord, Op. 1] (in Italian). Vol. I. Milan. pp. 16–20.
- Zahn, Johannes (1889–1893). Die Melodien der deutschen evangelischen Kirchenlieder (in German). Gütersloh: Bertelsmann. Volume:I – II – III – IV – V – VI
