= Mass in B minor =

1749 mass by Johann Sebastian Bach

- BWV 232
- by J. S. Bach
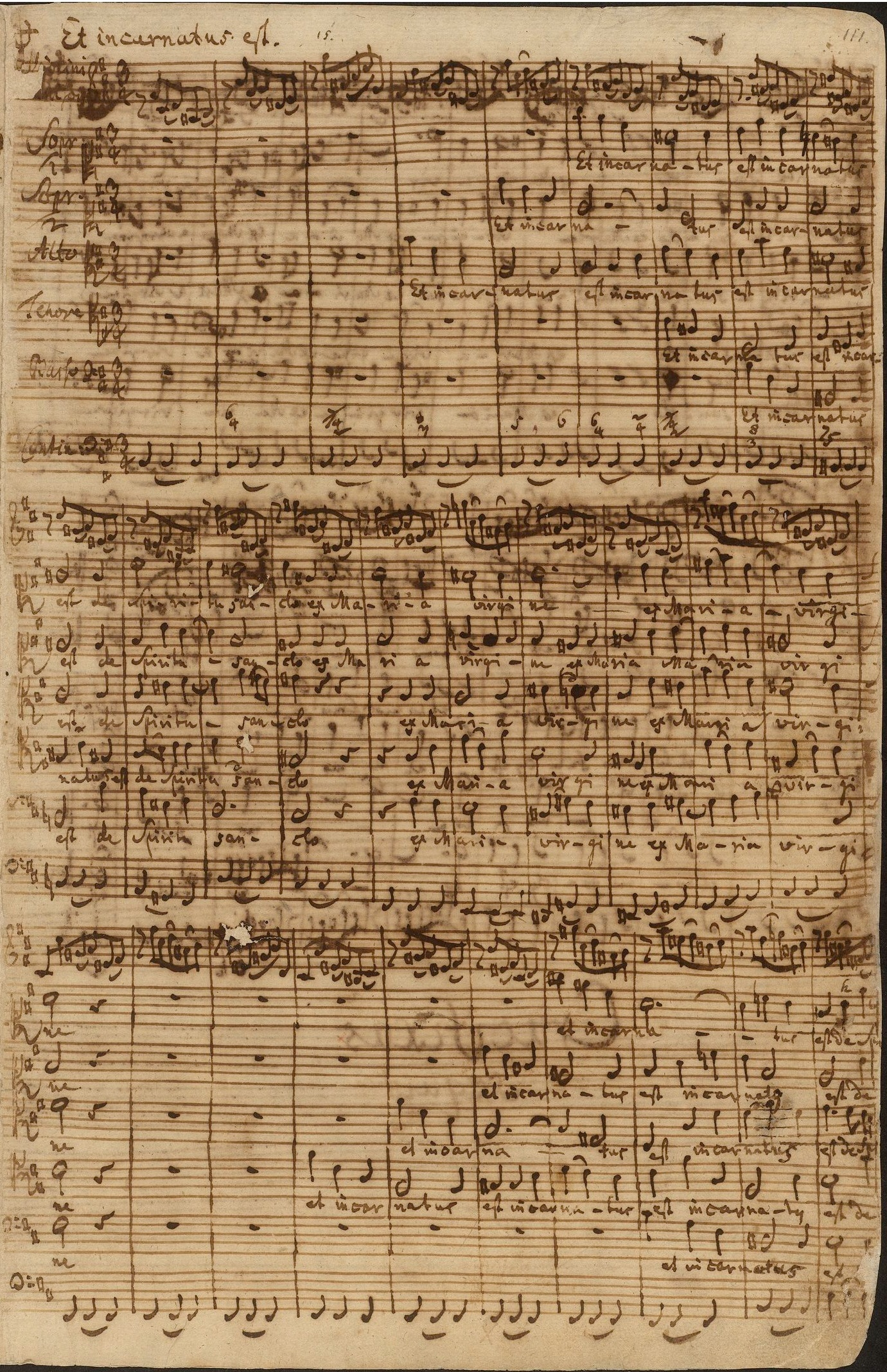
- Bach's 1748–1749 autograph score of the "Et incarnatus est"
- Form: Missa solemnis
- Related: Bach's Missa of 1733; most movements parodies of cantata movements
- Text: Latin Mass
- Composed: 1748?–1749, Leipzig
- Movements: 27 in 4 parts (12 + 9 + 1 + 5)
- Vocal: 2 choirs SATB; solo: 2 sopranos, alto, tenor and bass
- Instrumental: 3 trumpets; timpani; corno da caccia; 2 flauti traversi; 3 oboes; 2 oboes d'amore; 2 bassoons; 2 violins; viola; continuo

The Mass in B minor (German: h-Moll-Messe), BWV 232, is an extended setting of the Mass ordinary by Johann Sebastian Bach. The composition was completed in 1749, the year before Bach's death, and was to a large extent based on earlier work, such as a Sanctus Bach had composed in 1724. Sections that were specifically composed to complete the Mass in the late 1740s include the "Et incarnatus est" part of the Credo. It is structured in four major sections and scored for five soloists, a choir that is five-part in many sections and divided in the "Osanna", and a Baroque ensemble including brass and wind instruments.

In the legacy of his son Carl Philipp Emanuel Bach, it appears as the "Great Catholic Mass" (die große catholische Messe), referring to the fact that all parts of the Catholic mass are set to music.

Typically for the time, the composition is formatted as a Neapolitan mass, consisting of a succession of choral movements with a broad orchestral accompaniment, and sections in which a more limited group of instrumentalists accompanies one or more vocal soloists. Among the more unusual characteristics of the composition is its scale: a total performance time of around two hours, and a scoring consisting of two groups of SATB singers and an orchestra featuring an extended winds section, strings and continuo. Its key, B minor, is rather exceptional for a composition featuring natural trumpets in D, although far more of the work is in this key than B minor.

Even more exceptional, for a Lutheran composer such as Bach, is that the composition is a Missa tota. In Bach's day, Masses composed for Lutheran services usually consisted only of a Kyrie and Gloria. Bach had composed five such Kyrie–Gloria Masses before he completed his Mass in B minor: the four Kyrie–Gloria Masses, BWV 233–236, in the late 1730s, and the Mass for the Dresden court, which would become Part I of his only Missa tota, in 1733. The Mass was likely never performed in its entirety during Bach's lifetime. Its earliest documented complete performance took place in 1859. However, today, with frequent performances and many dozens of recordings available, it is among Bach's most popular vocal works.

In 2015, Bach's personal handwritten manuscript of the mass held by the Berlin State Library was included in the UNESCO's Memory of the World International Register a project to protect and preserve culturally significant documents and manuscripts.

== Background and context ==
On 1 February 1733, Augustus II the Strong, King of Poland, Grand Duke of Lithuania and Elector of Saxony, died. Five months of mourning followed, during which all public music-making was suspended. Bach used the opportunity to work on the composition of a Missa, a portion of the liturgy sung in Latin and common to both the Lutheran and Roman Catholic rites. His aim was to dedicate the work to the new sovereign Augustus III, a convert to Catholicism, with the hope of obtaining the title "Electoral Saxon Court Composer". Upon its completion, Bach visited Augustus III in Dresden and presented him with a copy of the Kyrie–Gloria Mass BWV 232 I (early version), together with a petition to be given a court title, dated July 27, 1733; in the accompanying inscription on the wrapper of the Mass he complains that he had "innocently suffered one injury or another" in Leipzig. The petition did not meet with immediate success, but Bach eventually got his title: he was made court composer to Augustus III in 1736.

In the last years of his life, Bach expanded the Missa into a complete setting of the Latin Ordinary. It is not known what prompted this creative effort. Wolfgang Osthoff and other scholars have suggested that Bach intended the completed Mass in B minor for performance at the dedication of the new Hofkirche in Dresden, a Catholic cathedral dedicated to the Holy Trinity, which was begun in 1738 and was nearing completion by the late 1740s. However, the building was not completed until 1751 and Bach's death in July 1750 prevented his Mass from being submitted for use at the dedication. Instead, Johann Adolph Hasse's Mass in D minor was performed, a work with many similarities to Bach's Mass (the Credo movements in both works feature chant over a walking bass line, for example). In 2013, Michael Maul published research suggesting the possibility that instead, Bach compiled it for performance in Vienna at St. Stephen's Cathedral (which was Roman Catholic) on St. Cecilia's Day in 1749, as a result of his association with Count Johann Adam von Questenberg. Other explanations are less event-specific, involving Bach's interest in 'encyclopedic' projects (like The Art of Fugue) that display a wide range of styles, and Bach's desire to preserve some of his best vocal music in a format with wider potential future use than the church cantatas they originated in (see "Movements and their sources" below).

== Chronology ==
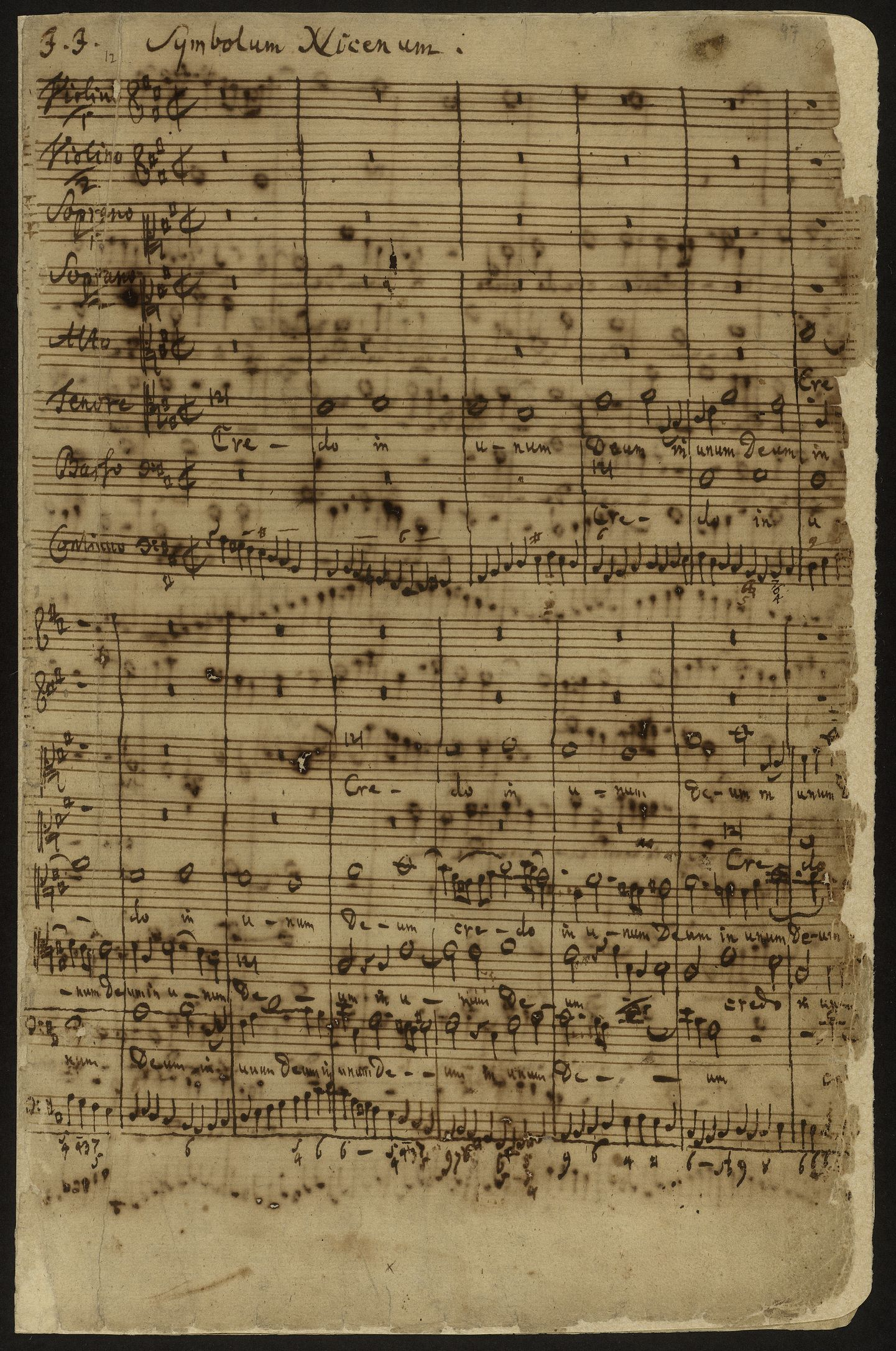
Autograph of the first page of Symbolum Nicenum, beginning with the Gregorian chant Credo in the tenor

The chronology of the Mass in B minor has attracted extensive scholarly attention. Recent literature suggests:

- In 1724, Bach composed a Sanctus for six vocal parts for use in the Christmas service. Bach revised it when he reused it in the Mass, changing its initial meter from to, and its vocal scoring from SSSATB to SSAATB.
- As noted above, in 1733 Bach composed the Missa (Kyrie and Gloria) during the five-month period of mourning following the February 1st death of Elector Augustus II and before July 27, when Bach presented the successor, Augustus III of Poland, with the Missa as a set of instrumental and vocal parts. It is possible that the Kyrie was meant as mourning music for Augustus II, and the Gloria as celebratory of the accession of Augustus III.
- In the mid-1740s (c. 1743–46). Bach re-used all three movements from the Gloria in a cantata for Christmas Day (Gloria in excelsis Deo, BWV 191) with minor changes of notes as well as the texts. Gregory Butler argues that at the same service (which he dates to Christmas 1745, to celebrate the Peace of Dresden), Bach also used the 1724 Sanctus, and that this revisiting of the 1733 Missa suggested further development to the composer.
- In the "last three years or so" of his life, Bach wrote/assembled the Symbolum Nicenum and the remainder of the work; many scholars, including Christoph Wolff, believe he did so in 1748–49. This dating in part reflects the scholarship of Yoshitake Kobayashi, who dates the Symbolum Nicenum section to August–October 1748 based on Bach's increasingly stiff and labored handwriting. Wolff among others argues that the "Et incarnatus est" movement was Bach's last significant composition. The words had been included in the preceding duet, but then Bach decided to treat them as a separate movement for the choir, giving the words extra weight and improving the symmetry of the Credo. John Butt argues that a definite final date of August 25, 1749, can be given, in that on this date C. P. E. Bach completed a setting of the Magnificat with an "Amen" chorus that "shows distinct similarities" to the 'Gratias' from the Missa and the 'Et expecto' from the Symbolum Nicenum." C. P. E. Bach later reported that he performed this Magnificat (Wq 215) in 1749 in Leipzig "at a Marian festival ... during the lifetime of his now-deceased father".

== Title ==
Bach did not give the Mass in B minor a title. Instead, he organized the 1748–49 manuscript into four folders, each with a different title. That containing the Kyrie and Gloria he called "1. Missa"; that containing the Credo he titled "2. Symbolum Nicenum"; the third folder, containing the Sanctus, he called "3. Sanctus"; and the remainder, in a fourth folder he titled "4. Osanna | Benedictus | Agnus Dei et | Dona nobis pacem". John Butt writes, "The format seems purposely designed so that each of the four sections could be used separately." On the other hand, the parts in the manuscript are numbered from 1 to 4, and Bach's usual closing formula (S.D.G = Soli Deo Gloria) is only found at the end of the Dona Nobis Pacem. Further, Butt writes, "What is most remarkable about the overall shape of the Mass in B Minor is that Bach managed to shape a coherent sequence of movements from diverse material." Butt and George Stauffer detail the ways in which Bach gave overall musical unity to the work.

The first overall title given to the work was in the 1790 estate of the recently deceased C.P.E. Bach, who inherited the score. There, it is called "Die Grosse Catholische Messe" (the "Great Catholic Mass"). It is called that as well in the estate of his last heir in 1805, suggesting to Stauffer that "the epithet reflects an oral tradition within the Bach family". The first publication of the Kyrie and Gloria, in 1833 by the Swiss collector Hans Georg Nägeli with Simrock, refers to it as "Messe" Finally, Nageli and Simrock produced the first publication in 1845, calling it the "High Mass in B Minor" (Hohe Messe in h-moll). The adjective "high", Butt argues, was "strongly influenced by the monumental impact of Beethoven's Missa solemnis." It soon fell from common usage, but the prepositional phrase "in B Minor" survives, even though it is in some ways misleading: only five of the work's 27 movements are in B minor, while twelve, including the final ones of each of the four major sections, are in D major (the relative major of B minor). The opening Kyrie, however, is in B minor, with the Christe Eleison in D major, and the second Kyrie in F-sharp minor; as Butt points out, these tonalities outline a B minor chord.

== Orchestration ==
The piece is orchestrated for two flutes, two oboes d'amore (doubling on oboes), two bassoons, one natural horn (in D), three natural trumpets (in D), timpani, violins I and II, violas and basso continuo (cellos, basses, bassoons, organ and harpsichord). A third oboe is required for the Sanctus.

== Performance history ==
=== In Bach's lifetime ===
Bach conducted the Sanctus, in its first version, at the 1724 Christmas service in Leipzig, and re-used it in Christmas services in the mid-1740s. Scholars differ on whether he ever performed the 1733 Missa. Arnold Schering (in 1936) asserted that it was performed in Leipzig on April 26, 1733, when Augustus III of Poland visited the town, but modern scholars reject his argument for several reasons:

1. the proposed date fell during an official period of mourning "when concerted music was forbidden in Saxon churches";
2. the extant parts (on which Schering based his hypothesis) are written on a paper found only in documents in Dresden, so were probably copied in Dresden when Bach went there in July; and
3. the copyists were not Bach's usual ones, but Bach and immediate family members who traveled with him to Dresden: his wife Anna Magdalena, and sons Wilhelm Friedemann and Carl Philipp Emanuel. It also appears that the Bach family employed a copyist in Dresden to assist them.

Scholars differ, however, on whether the Missa was performed in July in Dresden. Christoph Wolff argues that on July 26, 1733, at the Sophienkirche in Dresden, where Wilhelm Friedemann Bach had been organist since June, it "was definitely performed ... as evidenced by the extant Dresden performing parts and by the inscription on the title wrapper" given to the king the next day. Hans-Joachim Schulze made this case by pointing to the use of the past tense in the wrapper's inscription: "To his royal majesty was shown with the enclosed Missa ... the humble devotion of the author J. S. Bach." However, Joshua Rifkin rejects the argument, pointing out that the past-tense wording was typical of formal address often not related to performance. Also skeptical is Peter Williams, who notes that "there is no record of performers being assembled for such an event, and in August 1731 Friedemann reported that the Sophienkirche organ was badly out of tune." However, there is evidence of an organ recital by Bach at the Sophienkirche on 14 September 1731, and Friedemann Bach was only chosen as Organist for the institution on 23 June 1733. He would again perform a 2-hour Organ recital on 1 December 1736 at the Frauenkirche Dresden to inaugurate the new Gottfried Silbermann organ.

Scholars agree that no other public performances took place in Bach's lifetime, although Butt raises the possibility that there may have been a private performance or read-through of the Symbolum Nicenum late in Bach's life.

=== Later 18th century ===
The first public performance of the Symbolum Nicenum section (under the title "Credo or Nicene Creed") took place 36 years after Bach's death, in Spring of 1786, led by his son Carl Philipp Emanuel Bach at a benefit concert for the Medical Institute for the Poor in Hamburg. One of Bach’s admirers, Joseph Haydn, had a copy of the work along with The Well Tempered Clavier.

=== 19th century ===
As recounted by George Stauffer, the next documented performance (not public) in the nineteenth century was when Carl Friedrich Zelter—a key figure in the 19th-century Bach revival—led the Berlin Singakademie in read-throughs of the "Great Mass" in 1811, covering the Kyrie; in 1813 he led read-throughs of the entire work. The first public performance in the century—of just the Credo section—took place in Frankfurt in March, 1828, with over 200 performers and many instrumental additions. In the same year in Berlin, Gaspare Spontini led the Credo section, adding 15 new choral parts and numerous instruments. A number of performances of sections of the Mass took place in the following decades in Europe, but the first attested public performance of the Mass in its entirety took place in 1859 in Leipzig, with Karl Riedel and the Riedel-Verein. The first performance of the Mass in the UK was given by The Bach Choir, newly formed for this purpose by conductor Otto Goldschmidt, in 1876 in St James's Hall, London.

=== 20th century ===
The Bach Choir of Bethlehem performed the American premiere of the complete Mass on March 27, 1900, in Bethlehem, Pennsylvania, though there is evidence that parts of the Mass had been performed in the United States as early as 1870.

From early in the century, authors such as Albert Schweitzer, Arnold Schering, and Frederick Smend called for smaller performance forces, and experiments with (relatively) smaller groups began in the late 1920s.

The first complete recording of the work was made in 1929, with a large choir and the London Symphony Orchestra led by Albert Coates. As of 2022, a database lists over 350 complete recordings with many different types of forces and performance styles. The work has played a central role in the 'historical performance movement' : Nikolaus Harnoncourt made the first recording with "period instruments" in 1968, his second Bach choral recording. Joshua Rifkin's first recording using the one-voice-per-part vocal scoring he proposes was made in 1982, and won a 1983 Gramophone Award.

=== 21st century ===
The first use of the complete Mass as a liturgical setting for a Mass service occurred on October 4, 2025, in Kokkola, Finland. The service went on for 3 hours.

== Significance ==
The Mass in B minor is widely regarded as one of the supreme achievements of classical music. Alberto Basso summarizes the work as follows:

The Mass in B minor is the consecration of a whole life: started in 1733 for "diplomatic" reasons, it was finished in the very last years of Bach's life, when he had already gone blind. This monumental work is a synthesis of every stylistic and technical contribution the Cantor of Leipzig made to music. But it is also the most astounding spiritual encounter between the worlds of Catholic glorification and the Lutheran cult of the cross.

Scholars have suggested that the Mass in B minor belongs in the same category as The Art of Fugue, as a summation of Bach's deep lifelong involvement with musical tradition—in this case, with choral settings and theology. Bach scholar Christoph Wolff describes the work as representing "a summary of his writing for voice, not only in its variety of styles, compositional devices, and range of sonorities, but also in its high level of technical polish ... Bach's mighty setting preserved the musical and artistic creed of its creator for posterity."

The Mass was described in the 19th century by Nägeli as "The Announcement of the Greatest Musical Work of All Times and All People" ("Ankündigung des größten musikalischen Kunstwerkes aller Zeiten und Völker"). Despite being seldom performed, the Mass was appreciated by some of Bach's greatest successors: by the beginning of the 19th century Forkel and Haydn possessed copies.

== Autographs and editions ==
Two autograph sources exist: the parts for the Kyrie and Gloria sections that Bach deposited in Dresden in 1733, and the score of the complete work that Bach compiled in 1748–50, which was inherited by C.P.E. Bach (the autograph has been published in facsimile from the source in the Staatsbibliothek zu Berlin). However, for his 1786 public performance of the Symbolum Nicenum, C.P.E. Bach, as was typical practice in the era, made additions to the autograph score for performance by adding a 28-bar introduction, replacing the now-obsolete oboe d'amore with newer instruments (clarinets, oboes, or violins) and making other changes in instrumentation for his own aesthetic reasons. C.P.E. also wrote in his own solutions to reading some passages made nearly illegible by his father's late-life handwriting problems.

For this and other reasons, the Mass in B minor poses a considerable challenge to prospective editors, and substantial variations can be noted in different editions, especially amongst critical urtext editions. The Bach Gesellschaft edition, edited by Julius Rietz, was published in 1856 based on several sources but without direct access to the autograph. When access was later obtained, the textual problems were so evident that the society published a revised edition the next year. The 1857 edition was the standard for the next century, but was later recognized to be even less accurate than the 1856 version due to inadvertent incorporation of C.P.E. Bach's alterations in the autograph. Similarly, the 1954 edition by Friedrich Smend for the Neue Bach-Ausgabe was shown to have significant faults within five years of publication.

Christoph Wolff's edition, published by C.F. Peters in 1997, uses two copies of the 1748–50 manuscript made before C.P.E. Bach's additions to try to reconstruct Bach's original readings, and seeks to recover performance details by using all available sources, including cantata movements that Bach reworked in the B minor Mass. Joshua Rifkin's edition, published by Breitkopf & Härtel in 2006, also seeks to remove the C.P.E. Bach emendations, but differs from Wolff in arguing that the 1748–50 work is, to quote John Butt, "essentially a different entity from the 1733 Missa, and that a combination of the 'best' readings from both does not really correspond to Bach's final (and virtually completed) conception of the work"; Rifkin's version seeks to adhere to this final version.

Uwe Wolf's edition, published by Bärenreiter in 2010, relies upon x-ray spectrograph technology to differentiate J.S. Bach's handwriting from the additions made by C.P.E. Bach and others. Ulrich Leisinger's edition, published by Carus in 2014, accepts some of C.P.E. Bach's revisions and uses the 1733 Dresden parts as the primary source for the Kyrie and Gloria.

== Movements and their origins ==
The work consists of 27 sections. Tempo and metrical information and parodied cantata sources come from Christoph Wolff's 1997 critical urtext edition, and from George Stauffer's Bach: The Mass in B Minor. except where noted. Regarding sources, Stauffer, summarizing current research as of 1997, states that "Specific models or fragments can be pinpointed for eleven of the work's twenty-seven movements" and that "two other movements [the "Domine Deus" and "Et resurrexit"] are most probably derived from specific, now lost sources." But Stauffer adds "there is undoubtedly much more borrowing than this." Exceptions are the opening four bars of the first Kyrie, the Et incarnatus est and Confiteor.

Butt points out that "only with a musical aesthetic later than Bach's does the concept of parody (adapting existing vocal music to a new text) appear in an unfavourable light" while it was "almost unavoidable" in Bach's day. He further notes that "by abstracting movements from what he evidently considered some of his finest vocal works, originally performed for specific occasions and Sundays within the Church's year, he was doubtless attempting to preserve the pieces within the more durable context of the Latin Ordinary." Details of the parodied movements and their sources are given below.

=== I. Kyrie and Gloria ("Missa") ===
1. Kyrie eleison (1st)

Five-part chorus (Soprano I & II, Alto, Tenor, Bass) in B minor, marked Adagio (in the four-bar choral introduction) and then Largo in the main section with an autograph time signature of or common time.
Joshua Rifkin argues that, except for the opening four bars, the movement is based on a previous version in C minor, since examination of autograph sources reveals "a number of apparent transposition errors". John Butt concurs: "Certainly, much of the movement—like many others with no known models—seems to have been copied from an earlier version." Butt raises the possibility that the opening four bars were originally for instruments alone, but Gergely Fazekas details a case, based on manuscript, historical context, and musical structure, that "Bach might have composed the present introduction in a simpler form for the original C minor version" but "might have made the inner texture denser only for the 1733 B minor version."

2. Christe eleison

Duet (Soprano I & II) in D major with obbligato violins, no autograph tempo marking, time signature of.

3. Kyrie eleison (2nd)

Four-part chorus (Soprano, Alto, Tenor, Bass) in F♯ minor, marked alla breve, and (in the 1748–50 score) "stromenti in unisono". Autograph time signature is. George Stauffer points out (p. 49) that "the four-part vocal writing ... points to a model conceived outside the context of a five-voice Mass."

Note the nine (trinitarian, 3 × 3) movements that follow with a largely symmetrical structure, and the Domine Deus in the centre.

4. Gloria in excelsis

Five-part chorus (Soprano I & II, Alto, Tenor, Bass) in D major, marked Vivace in the 1733 first violin and cello parts, 3/8 time signature. In the mid-1740s, Bach reused this as the opening chorus of his cantata Gloria in excelsis Deo, BWV 191.

5. Et in terra pax

Five-part chorus (Soprano I & II, Alto, Tenor, Bass) in D major, no autograph tempo marking, time signature of; in the autographs no double bar separates it from the preceding Gloria section. Again, Bach reused the music in the opening chorus of BWV 191.

6. Laudamus te

Aria (Soprano II) in A major with violin obbligato, no autograph tempo marking, time signature of. William H. Scheide argues that Bach based this movement on the opening aria of a lost wedding cantata of his (for which we now have only the text) Sein Segen fliesst daher wie ein Strom, BWV Anh. I 14

7. Gratias agimus tibi

Four-part chorus (Soprano, Alto, Tenor, Bass) in D major, marked alla breve, time signature of. The music is a reworking of the second movement of Bach's 1731 Ratswechsel (Town Council Inauguration) cantata Wir danken dir, Gott, wir danken dir, BWV 29, in which the time signature is the number 2 with a slash through it. (Stauffer adds that both may have an earlier common source.)

8. Domine Deus

Duet (soprano I, tenor) in G major with flute obbligato and muted strings, no autograph tempo marking, time signature of. The music appears as a duet in BWV 191.
In the 1733 parts, Bach indicates a "Lombard rhythm" in the slurred two-note figures in the flute part; he does not indicate it in the final score or in BWV 191. Stauffer points out (p. 246) that this rhythm was popular in Dresden in 1733. It is possible that Bach added in the 1733 parts to appeal to tastes at the Dresden court and that he no longer wanted it used in the 1740s, or that he still preferred it but no longer felt it necessary to notate it.

9. Qui tollis peccata mundi

Four-part chorus (Soprano II, Alto, Tenor, Bass) in B minor, marked adagio in the two violin 1 parts from 1733 and lente in the cello, continuo, and alto parts from 1733; 3/4 time signature. No double bar separates it from the preceding movement in the autograph. The chorus is a reworking of the first half of the opening movement of the 1723 cantata Schauet doch und sehet, ob irgend ein Schmerz sei, BWV 46.

10. Qui sedes ad dexteram Patris

Aria (alto) in B minor with oboe d'amore obbligato, no autograph tempo marking, 6/8 time signature.

11. Quoniam tu solus sanctus

Aria (bass) in D major with obbligato parts for solo corno da caccia (hunting horn or Waldhorn) and two bassoons, no autograph tempo marking, 3/4 time signature.
Stauffer notes that the unusual scoring shows Bach writing specifically for the strengths of the orchestra in Dresden: while Bach wrote no music for two obbligato bassoons in his Leipzig cantatas, such scoring was common for works others composed in Dresden, "which boasted as many as five bassoonists", and that Dresden was a noted center for horn playing. Peter Damm has argued that Bach designed the horn solo specifically for the Dresden horn soloist Johann Adam Schindler, whom Bach had almost certainly heard in Dresden in 1731.
Regarding lost original sources, Stauffer says, "A number of writers have viewed the clean appearance of the "Quoniam" and the finely detailed performance instructions in the autograph score as signs that this movement is also a parody." Klaus Hafner argues that the bassoon lines were, in the original, written for oboe, and that in this original a trumpet, not the horn, was the solo instrument. John Butt agrees, adding as evidence that Bach originally notated both bassoon parts with the wrong clefs, both indicating a range an octave higher than the final version, and then corrected the error, and adding that "oboe parts would almost certainly have been scored with trumpet rather than horn." William H. Scheide has argued in detail that it is a parody of the third movement of the lost wedding cantata Sein Segen fliesst daher wie ein Strom, BWV Anh. I 14 Stauffer, however, entertains the possibility that it may be new music.

12. Cum Sancto Spiritu

Five-part chorus (Soprano I & II, Alto, Tenor, Bass) in D major, marked Vivace, 3/4 time signature.
Bach reused the music in modified form as the closing chorus of BWV 191. As to origins, Donald Francis Tovey argued that it is based on a lost choral movement from which Bach removed the opening instrumental ritornello, saying "I am as sure as I can be of anything". Hafner agrees, and like Tovey, has offered a reconstruction of the lost ritornello; he also points to notational errors (again involving clefs) suggesting that the lost original was in four parts, and that Bach added the Soprano II line when converting the original into the Cum Sancto Spiritu chorus. Rifkin argues from the neat handwriting in the instrumental parts of the final score that the movement is based on a lost original, and he argues from the musical structure, which involves two fugues, that the original was probably a lost cantata from the middle or late 1720s, when Bach was especially interested in such structures. Stauffer is agnostic on the question.

=== II. Credo ("Symbolum Nicenum") ===
Note the nine movements with the symmetrical structure and the crucifixion at the centre.

1. Credo in unum Deum

Five-part chorus (Soprano I & II, Alto, Tenor, Bass) in A Mixolydian, no autograph tempo marking,. Stauffer identifies an earlier Credo in unum Deum chorus in G major, probably from 1748 to 1749.

2. Patrem omnipotentem

Four-part chorus (Soprano, Alto, Tenor, Bass) in D major, no autograph tempo marking, time signature of 2 with a slash through it in the autograph manuscript. The music is a reworking of the opening chorus of Gott, wie dein Name, so ist auch dein Ruhm, BWV 171.

3. Et in unum Dominum

Duet (soprano I, alto) in G major, marked Andante,. Stauffer derives it from a "lost duet, considered for "Ich bin deine", BWV 213/11 (1733). Original version also included "Et incarnatus est"; the two movements were split when Bach put together the complete Missa in 1748–49.

4. Et incarnatus est

Five-part chorus (Soprano I & II, Alto, Tenor, Bass) in B minor, no autograph tempo marking, 3/4 time signature. Wolff among others argues that the "Et incarnatus est" movement was Bach's last significant composition.

5. Crucifixus

Four-part chorus (Soprano II, Alto, Tenor, Bass) in E minor, no autograph tempo marking, 3/2 time signature. The music is a reworking of the first section of the first chorus of the 1714 cantata Weinen, Klagen, Sorgen, Zagen, BWV 12.

6. Et resurrexit

Five-part chorus (Soprano I & II, Alto, Tenor, Bass) in D major, no autograph tempo marking, 3/4 time signature, polonaise rhythms.

7. Et in Spiritum Sanctum

Aria (Bass) in A major with oboi d'amore obbligati, no autograph tempo marking, 6/8 time signature. William H. Scheide has argued that it is a parody of the sixth movement of the lost wedding cantata Sein Segen fließt daher wie ein Strom, BWV Anh. I 14 (=BWV 1144). Stauffer, however, entertains the possibility that it may be new music.

8. Confiteor

Five-part chorus (Soprano I & II, Alto, Tenor, Bass) in F♯ minor, no autograph tempo marking (until the transitional music in bar 121, which is marked "adagio"), time signature.
John Butt notes that "the only positive evidence of Bach actually composing afresh within the entire score of the mass is in the 'Confiteor' section", by which he means, "composing the music directly into the autograph. Even the most unpracticed eye can see the difference between this and surrounding movements"; one part of the final transitional music is "still illegible ... and necessitates the conjectures of a judicious editor."

9. Et expecto

Five-part chorus (Soprano I & II, Alto, Tenor, Bass) in D major, marked Vivace ed allegro, implicitly in (as it is not set off with a double bar in the autograph from the Confiteor). The music is a reworking of the second movement of Bach's 1728 town council inauguration (Ratswechsel) cantata Gott, man lobet dich in der Stille, BWV 120 on the words Jauchzet, ihr erfreute Stimmen.

=== III. Sanctus ===
1. Sanctus

Six-part chorus (Soprano I & II, Alto I & II, Tenor, Bass) in D major, no autograph tempo marking, time signature; leading immediately—without double bar in the sources—into the Pleni sunt coeli, marked Vivace, 3/8 time signature. Derived from an earlier three soprano and one alto work written in 1724 and repeated and altered slightly on Easter 1727; in that 1724/1727 Sanctus the first section was marked in, perhaps suggesting a tempo faster than what Bach conceived of when he finally re-used it in the Mass.

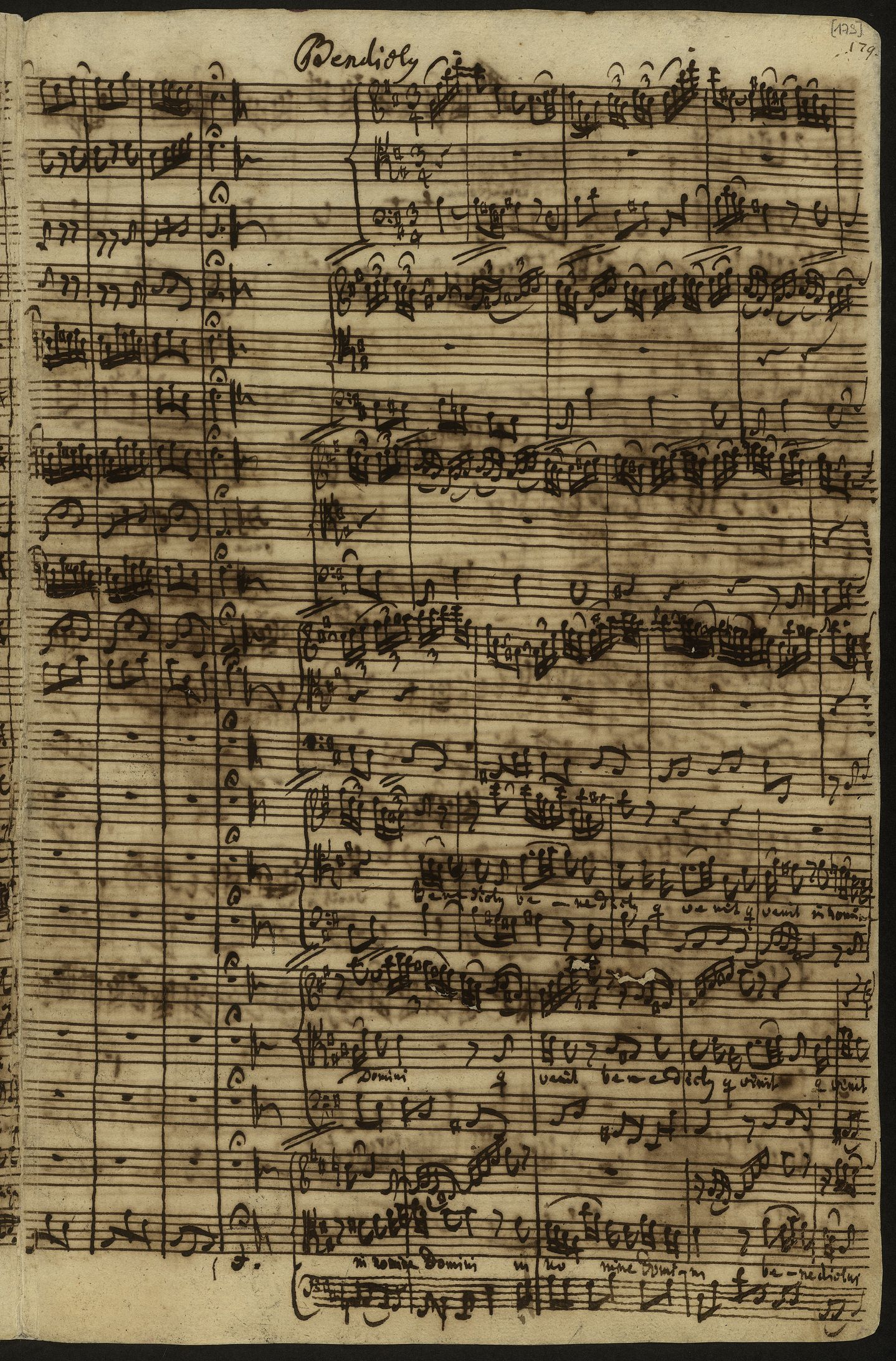
Autograph score of the Benedictus, aria for tenor and obbligato flute

=== IV. Osanna, Benedictus, Agnus Dei and Dona Nobis Pacem ===
Agnus Dei aria from Mass in B minor by Johann Sebastian Bach
Performed at Latin Cathedral in Lviv, Ukraine. Performed by Solomija Drozd (contralto), Petro Titiajev (violin), Ivan Ostapovych (organ). Run time is four minutes, 41 seconds

1. Osanna

Double chorus (both four parts) in D major, no autograph tempo marking, 3/8 time signature. A reworking of the A section of the chorus Es lebe der König, BWV Anh. 11/1 (1732) or Preise dein Glücke, BWV 215 (1734).

2. Benedictus

Aria for tenor with obbligato instrument (Flute or Violin) in B minor, no autograph tempo marking, 3/4 time signature.
Butt writes that Bach "forgot to specify the instrument" for the obbligato; Stauffer adds the possibilities that Bach had not decided which instrument to use or that he was "indifferent" and left the choice open. The Bach-Ausgabe edition assigned it to the violin, and Stauffer suggests this choice may have been influenced by Beethoven's use of the violin in the Benedictus of his Missa solemnis. Modern editors and performers have preferred the flute; as Butt notes, the part never uses the G-string of the violin, and modern commentators "consider the range and style to be more suitable for the transverse flute."
William H. Scheide has argued that it is a parody of the fourth movement of the lost wedding cantata Sein Segen fliesst daber wie ein Strom, BWV Anh. I 14, for which the text begins "Ein Mara weicht von dir" Stauffer, however, entertains the possibility that it may be new music.

3. Osanna (da capo)

As above.

4. Agnus Dei

Aria for alto in G minor with violin obbligato, no autograph tempo marking, time signature. Parody of an aria, "Entfernet euch, ihr kalten Herzen" ("Withdraw, you cold hearts"), from a lost wedding serenade (1725). Bach also re-used the wedding aria for the alto aria, "Ach, bleibe doch", of his 1735 Ascension Oratorio Lobet Gott in seinen Reichen, BWV 11; Alfred Dürr has demonstrated that Bach adapted both "Ach, bleibe doch" and the Agnus dei directly from the lost serenade's aria, rather than from one to the next.

5. Dona nobis pacem

Four-part chorus in D major, no autograph tempo marking, time signature. The music is almost identical to "Gratias agimus tibi" from the Gloria.

== Recordings ==
As of 2022, 354 recordings are listed on the Bach Cantatas Website, beginning with the first recording by a symphony orchestra and choir to match, conducted by Albert Coates. Beginning in the late 1960s, historically informed performances paved the way for recordings with smaller groups, boys choirs and ensembles playing "period instruments", and eventually to recordings using the one-voice-on-a-vocal-part scoring first argued for by Joshua Rifkin in 1982.

== See also ==
- Mass in B minor structure
- Mass in B minor discography
