= Bach's Missa of 1733 =

Missa in B minor
- BWV 232 I
- by J. S. Bach
- Title page for the bundle of part scores of the Kyrie–Gloria Mass which Bach sent to Dresden in 1733. The page includes a dedication to the Saxon Elector and a list of voices and instruments.
- Form: Kyrie-Gloria-mass
- Related: Mass in B minor; several movements parodies of cantata movements
- Text: Latin Mass
- Composed: 1733, Leipzig
- Movements: 12
- Vocal: choir SSATB; solo: 2 sopranos, alto, tenor and bass
- Instrumental: 3 trumpets; timpani; corno da caccia; 2 flauti traversi; 3 oboes; 2 oboes d'amore; 2 bassoons; 2 violins; viola; continuo

Bach's Missa of 1733, BWV 232 I (early version), is a Kyrie–Gloria Mass in B minor, composed in 1733 by Johann Sebastian Bach. It is an extended missa brevis (German: Kurzmesse, lit. 'short Mass') consisting of a Kyrie in three movements and a Gloria in nine movements. Bach started to compose it, partly based on earlier work, after the death of his sovereign Augustus the Strong (1 February 1733), dedicating it to the latter's son and successor, Frederick August II, in a letter dated 27 July 1733. At the time, Bach was in his tenth year as Lutheran church musician in Leipzig, while the Catholic court of the sovereign Elector of Saxony was located in Dresden. Bach sent performance parts of his Missa to Dresden while he kept the autograph score in Leipzig. Upon arrival in Dresden, the Mass was not added to the repertoire of the Catholic court chapel, but instead the parts, and Bach's dedication letter, were archived in the sovereign's library.

The composition, also known as Bach's Mass for the Dresden court, is an unusually extended work scored for five-part SSATB soloists and choir with an orchestra having a broad winds section. After reusing some of its music in a cantata he composed around 1745 (BWV 191), Bach finally incorporated the 1733 Missa as the first of four parts of his Mass in B minor, composed/assembled in the last years of his life, around 1748–1749. It seems unlikely that the 1733 Kyrie–Gloria Mass, either in its original form or as part of the Mass in B minor, was ever performed during Bach's lifetime.

The Kyrie–Gloria Mass was not assigned a separate number in the BWV catalogue, but in order to distinguish it from the later complete mass (BWV 232), numbers like BWV 232a and BWV 232^{I} are in use. In 2005 Bärenreiter published the Mass in the New Bach Edition series as Missa, BWV 232 I, Fassung von 1733 (i.e. 1733 version of Missa, BWV 232 I), in a volume of early versions of the Mass in B minor. That volume also contained early versions of the Credo (BWV 232 II) and Sanctus (BWV 232 III) of the later Mass. Bach's Mass for the Dresden court is also referred to as Missa 1733 and "The Missa of 1733". The Bach Digital website refers to the work as "BWV 232/I (Frühfassung)", i.e. early version of Part I of BWV 232.

== History ==
Bach was a Lutheran church musician, devoted to the composition of sacred music in German. He wrote more than 200 cantatas for the liturgy, most of them in Leipzig from 1723 to 1726 at the beginning of his tenure as Thomaskantor, responsible for the music at the major churches. In Leipzig, a university city where Latin was understood, musical settings of the traditional Latin texts were performed on festive holidays. Bach composed works on Latin texts, for example a Magnificat in 1723, performed both on the Marian feast Visitation and Christmas that year, and in 1724 a Sanctus for Christmas, which he later integrated into his Mass in B minor. Both works were exceptional settings: the Magnificat extended to five vocal parts and the Sanctus to six voices, when four-part singing was common in Leipzig.

=== Bach's intentions with the composition ===
Augustus the Strong, King of Poland and Elector of Saxony, died on 1 February 1733. He had converted to the Catholic Church in order to ascend to the throne of Poland in 1697. During a period of mourning, no cantata performances were permitted in Leipzig, interrupting Bach's normal work of a weekly cantata performance. Bach was free to compose a Kyrie–Gloria Mass for the court of Dresden, where the successor was the later Augustus III of Poland. Bach presented the parts of the works to him with a note dated 27 July 1733, in the hope of obtaining the title "Saxon Electoral Court Composer":

In deepest Devotion I present to your Royal Highness this small product of that science which I have attained in Musique, with the most humble request that you will deign to regard it not according to the imperfection of its Composition, but with a most gracious eye ... and thus take me into your most mighty Protection.

A different translation of this polite understatement is "an insignificant product of the skill I have attained in music." In the note, Bach also complained that he had "innocently suffered one injury or another" in Leipzig. Petitions to the new ruler after the death of the previous one, as the one sent by Bach, were not exceptional in nature: similar petitions by musicians to August III included those of Jan Dismas Zelenka (unsuccessfully competing with Johann Adolph Hasse for the post of Kapellmeister), Johann Joachim Quantz and Pantaleon Hebenstreit (a Lutheran court church director). What was exceptional was that Bach accompanied his petition with a composition of considerable dimensions — a liturgical composition, no less — which was surprising in that Bach was then employed as a Lutheran church composer, and indeed was identified as a devout Lutheran, but was here presenting a work for the Catholic liturgy.

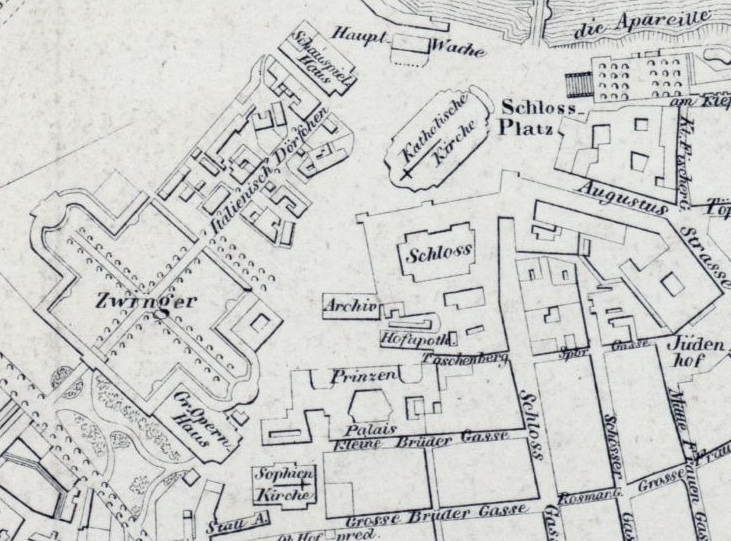
This detail from an 1828 map of Dresden shows the location of the Opernhaus am Taschenberg, the court theatre that in the 1660s was built adjacent to the Elector's palace, then in 1708 transformed into the Catholic Hofkirche, and, by the time this map was drawn, after building the Katholische Kirche (1739–1751), among others, transformed into an archive (indicated as "Archiv" in the middle of this picture). The location of the Sophienkirche is shown in the lower part of this detail.

At the time, Germany lived under the cuius regio, eius religio principle (inhabitants of a region must follow the religion of their ruler), which led to a somewhat bifurcated situation in Dresden under August the Strong, who was officially Catholic in Poland, but was only privately Catholic in Dresden — no Catholicism was imposed on Lutheran Saxony; only the court at Dresden was Catholic. Lutherans, including the Electress Christiane Eberhardine, who steadfastly refused to convert to Catholicism (and for whom Bach had composed his Trauerode when she died in 1727), had the Sophienkirche as their place of worship, (Note: Note that the Sophienkirche was not called the Hofkirche before 1737, so for the purposes of this article about a 1733 composition, "Hofkirche" refers exclusively to the Catholic court church housed in the former Opernhaus am Taschenberg and served by the court chapel musicians (also predating plans for the later Hofkirche/Cathedral built between the later Schloßplatz and Theaterplatz within about half a decade).) while the Catholic Hofkirche (Court church) was housed in the former court theatre from 1708.

Luther had not rejected any of the five parts of the Mass ordinary that traditionally were eligible for a musical setting (Kyrie, Gloria, Nicene Creed, Sanctus, Agnus Dei): thus, Protestant mass celebrations could still include any of these (and/or their translation in the local language). There is no doubt that Bach admired his ancestor Veit for his Lutheranism. In all probability Bach seems to have written a Lutheran liturgical composition that would have been just as acceptable in a Catholic mass. Whatever his intentions, the composition shows Bach's panache and the admirable boldness of a manifestly versatile and confident composer, all of which came only six years after he openly chose the Lutheran side upon the death of the new elector's mother.

For the music, Bach borrowed extensively from his previous cantata compositions. Bach may have had the capabilities of the singers and instrumentalists of the Dresden court chapel (which served the Hofkirche) in mind when composing the piece: at the time these included Johann Georg Pisendel (violinist and concert master), Johann Christian Richter (oboist), and the flautists Pierre-Gabriel Buffardin and Johann Joachim Quantz. These performers, versed in the French as well as Italian performance styles, were the best of what could be found anywhere in Europe. The new elector's taste for the operatic genre was no secret either. For church music the Neapolitan mass came closest to that genre, and this was the preferred Mass type at the Hofkirche. Bach was no doubt aware that apart from the excellent instrumentalists, the Dresden Hofkapelle ("court chapel") also had vocal soloists at its disposal (such as Faustina Bordoni, the wife of Johann Adolph Hasse) who could excel in the type of arias that was customary in operas and Neapolitan masses.

The score Bach sent to Dresden consisted of the separate parts for Soprano I, Soprano II, Alto, Tenor, Bass, Trumpet I, Trumpet II, Trumpet III, Timpani, Corno da Caccia, Flauto traverso I, Flauto traverso II, Oboe (d'amore) I, Oboe (d'amore) II, Oboe (d'amore) III, Violins I (2 copies), Violins II, Viola, Cello, Bassoon and Basso continuo. Most of these copies were written by Bach himself, but for the last movements of both Kyrie and Gloria his sons Carl Philipp Emanuel (soprano parts), Wilhelm Friedemann (violino I parts), and his wife Anna Magdalena (cello parts) helped, along with an anonymous copyist (oboe and basso continuo parts). Performance material for the choir was not included, nor was the basso continuo part very elaborated. All these parts appear to have been copied directly from the full score, which Bach kept in Leipzig. Bach supplied the parts for single performers with many details that are not in the score he kept.

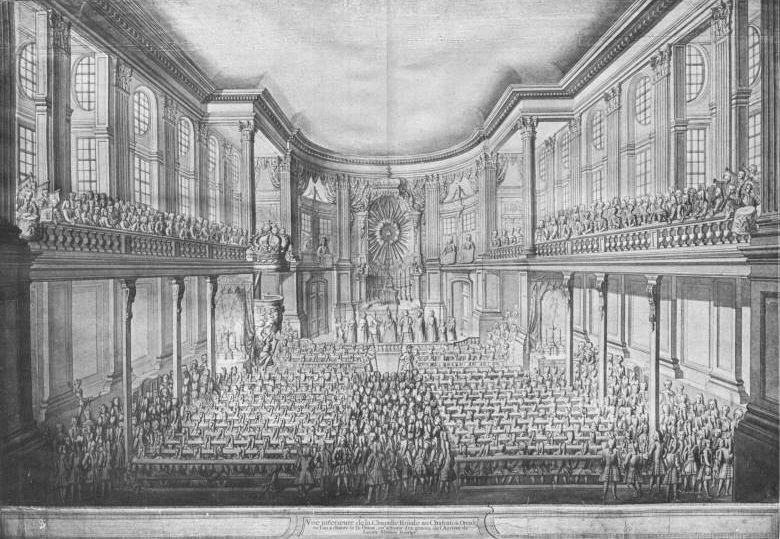
Interior of the Hofkirche (Hofkapelle) (Note: Court chapel: in this instance referring to the church building; other instances of Hofkapelle/court chapel in this article generally refer to chapel as an ensemble of musicians, directed by a chapel master (Kapellmeister).) in 1719

Although some commentators suggest other liturgical and worldly venues where Bach may have anticipated a performance of the Missa, there seems little doubt that Bach intended to tailor the piece so that it could be performed at the Dresden Hofkirche.

=== Reception at the Dresden court ===
When the composition arrived in Dresden its format wasn't very unusual compared to other works performed at the time at the Hofkirche. The repertoire performed there included over thirty masses consisting of only a Kyrie and Gloria. Many of these were composed or acquired by the court composer at the time Jan Dismas Zelenka; and in most cases, as also happened with Bach's Missa, these were later expanded into a complete mass (missa tota), or at least a Mass with all the usual Mass sections except the Credo (missa senza credo). Nor the fact that Bach's Missa was composed for virtuoso performers, nor that it was a composition requiring a SSATB choir could be considered exceptional at the time and place.

The key signature of the mass was somewhat exceptional: the Hofkirche 1765 catalogue contains only one Mass in B minor, by Antonio Caldara. D major, the relative major key of B minor (i.e. with the same accidentals), was the most usual key for festive music including trumpets, because of the Saxon natural trumpet: all of Zelenka's solemn masses were in that key, but also 6 of the 12 movements of Bach's Missa (including the Christe eleison and the opening and closing movements of the Gloria) have that same key signature. The most exceptional feature of Bach's mass appears to have been its duration, which largely exceeded what was usual compared to similar compositions at the time in Dresden. This seems the most likely reason why the composition was filed in the Royal Library upon arrival in Dresden, instead of being added to the repertoire of the Hofkirche.

As for the result of his petition to the new ruler in Dresden: some three years after his request Bach received the title of Royal Court Composer. In the intermediate period the Elector had other business to attend to: the War of the Polish Succession.

=== Performance history before being integrated in the Mass in B minor, BWV 232 ===
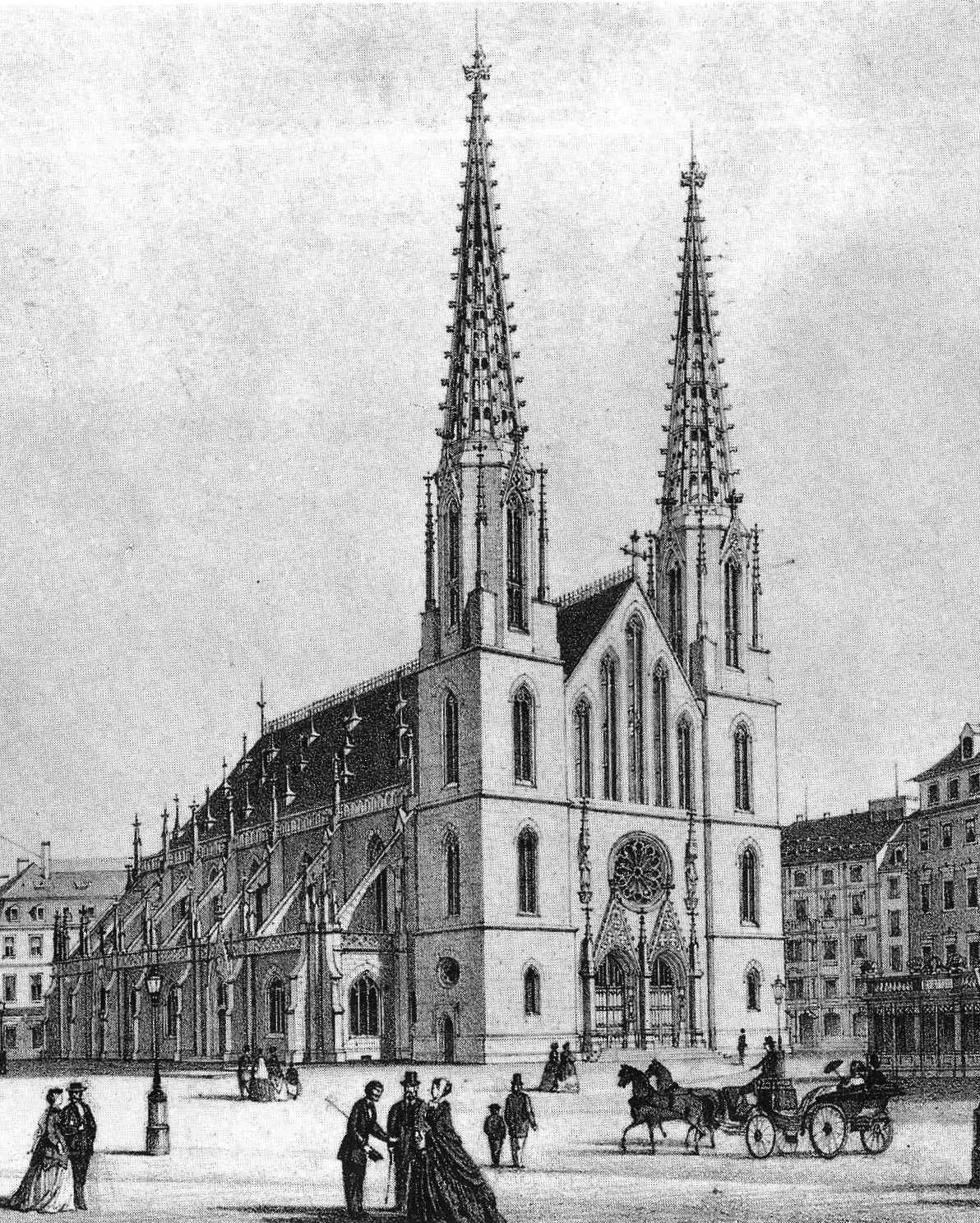
Sophienkirche, Dresden, possibly the location of a first performance

It is debated if the Missa was performed at the time. If it was performed, the most likely venue was the Sophienkirche in Dresden, where Bach's son Wilhelm Friedemann had been organist since June.

Around 1745 Bach used three movements of the Gloria of the Missa of 1733 for his cantata Gloria in excelsis Deo, BWV 191.

== Scoring and structure — incorporation in the Mass in B minor, BWV 232 ==
In the last years of his life, presumably around 1748–1749, Bach integrated the complete Missa of 1733 unchanged in his Mass in B minor, his only missa tota. Scoring and structure are identical with the later work, but markings differ because the parts contain more details than the 1733 score which he kept. Bach made changes to that score when he completed the mass.

The work is scored for five vocal parts, two sopranos, alto, tenor and bass, and an orchestra of three trumpets, timpani, corno da caccia, two flauti traversi, two oboes, two oboes d'amore, two bassoons, two violins, viola, and basso continuo.

The Kyrie is structured in three movements. Two different choral movements frame a duet for two sopranos. The Gloria is structured in nine movements in a symmetric arrangement around a duet of soprano and tenor.

The Missa of 1733 forms a considerable part of the Mass in B minor which publisher Hans Georg Nägeli described in 1818 as "the greatest musical art work of all times and nations" when he tried a first publication.

== Publication ==
In 2005, Bärenreiter published the work, titled "Missa, BWV 232 I, Fassung von 1733", as part of the Neue Bach Ausgabe. The editor of three Early Versions of the Mass BWV 232, the others being "Credo in unum Deum, BWV 232 II, Frühfassung in G" and "Sanctus, BWV 232 III, Fassung von 1724" was Uwe Wolf.

== Sources ==
- Wolff, Christoph (2013). "Past, present and future perspectives on Bach's B-minor Mass". In Tomita, Yo; Leaver, Robin A.; Smaczny, Jan (eds.). Exploring Bach's B-minor Mass. Cambridge University Press. pp. 3–20. ISBN 978-1-107-00790-1.
- Leaver, Robin A. (2013). "Bach's Mass: 'Catholic' or 'Lutheran'?". In Tomita, Yo; Leaver, Robin A.; Smaczny, Jan (eds.). Exploring Bach's B-minor Mass. Cambridge University Press. pp. 21–38. ISBN 978-1-107-00790-1.
- Stockigt, Janice B. (2013). "Bach's Missa BWV 232^{I} in the context of Catholic Mass settings in Dresden, 1729–1733". In Tomita, Yo; Leaver, Robin A.; Smaczny, Jan (eds.). Exploring Bach's B-minor Mass. Cambridge University Press. pp. 39–53. ISBN 978-1-107-00790-1.
