= Preise dein Glücke, gesegnetes Sachsen, BWV 215 =

1734 secular cantata by J S Bach

Preise dein Glücke, gesegnetes Sachsen
- BWV 215
- Dramma per musica by J. S. Bach
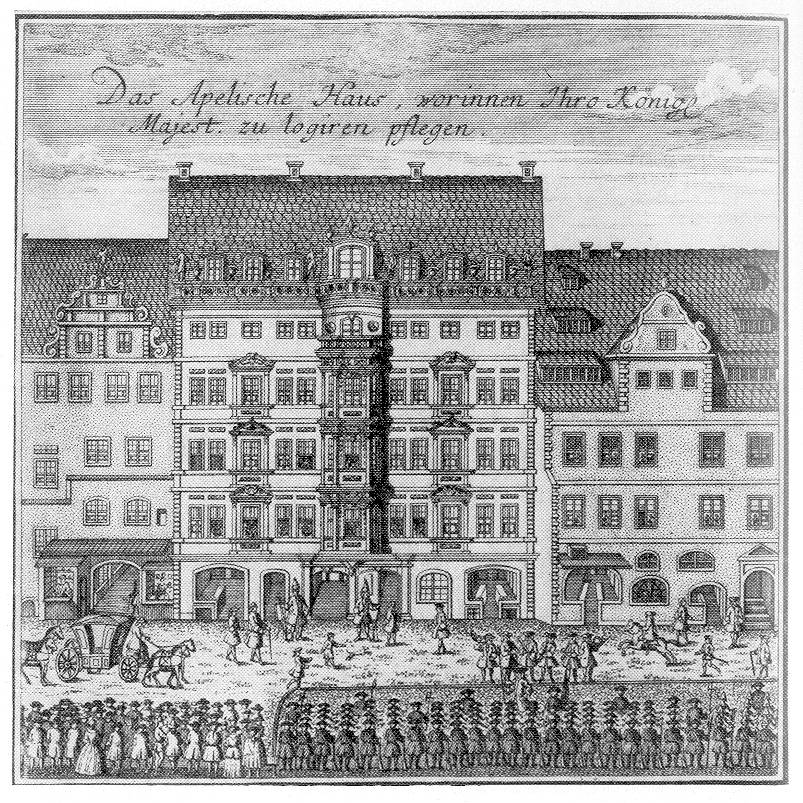
- Palace of the Elector in Leipzig
- Related: basis for Osanna of Mass in B minor
- Occasion: Anniversary of the election of August III as King of Poland
- Cantata text: Johann Christoph Clauder
- Performed: 5 October 1734: Leipzig
- Movements: 9
- Vocal: 2 SATB choirs and soloists
- Instrumental: 3 trumpets; timpani; 2 flauti traversi; 2 oboes; 2 violins; viola; continuo

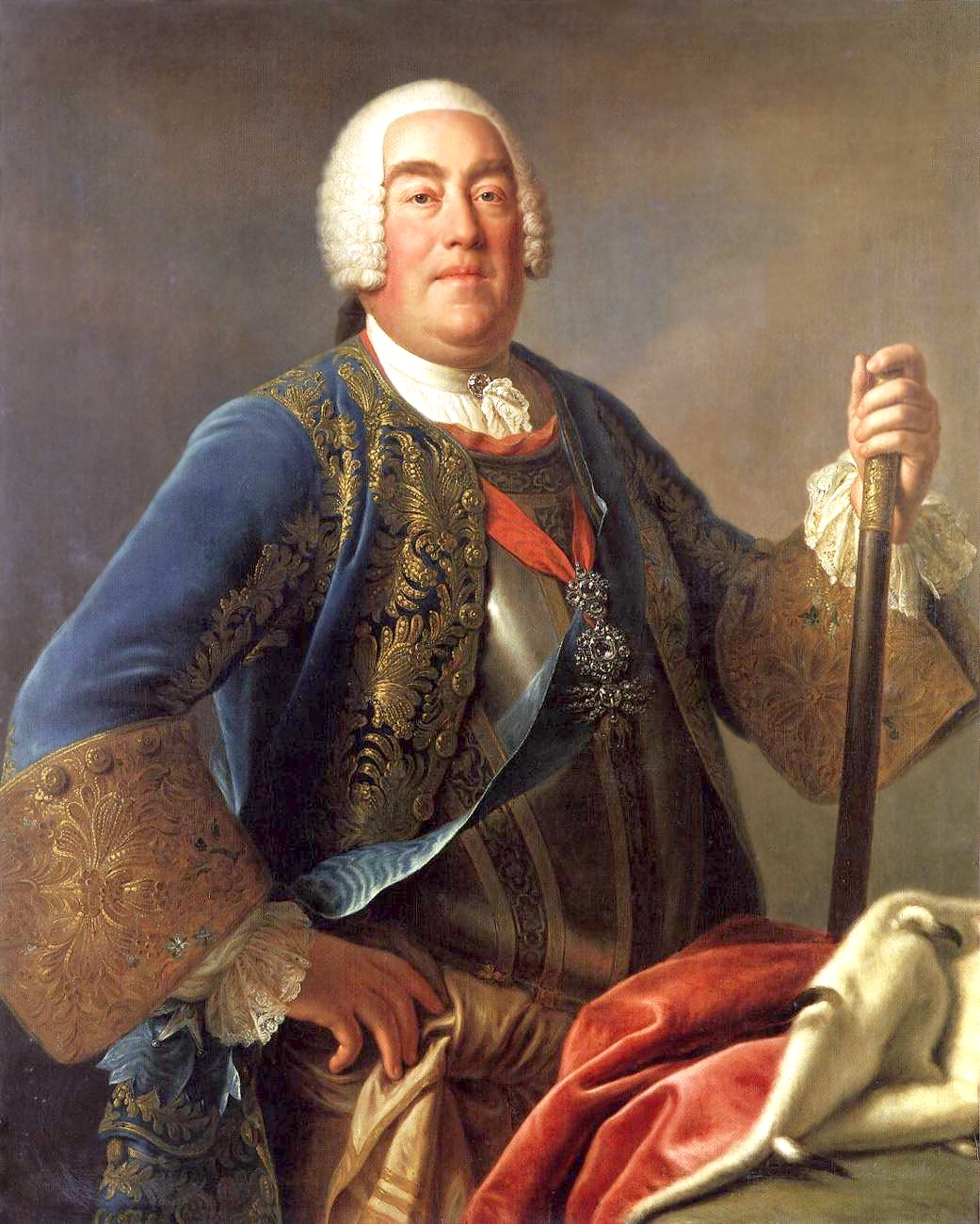
August III, Elector of Saxony and King of Poland

Preise dein Glücke, gesegnetes Sachsen (Praise your good fortune, blessed Saxony), BWV 215, (Note: "BWV" is Bach-Werke-Verzeichnis, a thematic catalogue of Bach's works.) is a secular cantata by Johann Sebastian Bach. He composed the cantata gratulatoria (congratulatory cantata) or Dramma per musica (drama in music) in Leipzig as a Festmusik für das kurfürstlich sächsische Haus (Festive music for the court of the Electorate of Saxony) for the anniversary of the election of August III, Elector of Saxony, as King of Poland, and first performed it on 5 October 1734 in the presence of the Elector.

== History and words ==
Bach wrote several works for celebrations of the Leipzig University, Festmusiken zu Leipziger Universitätsfeiern. The Neue Bach-Ausgabe has detailed background information about the events around the composition and first performance of this cantata, collected by Werner Neumann. August III, Elector of Saxony and of Poland, had announced his presence in Leipzig from 2 to 6 October 1734, on short notice. As the anniversary of his election as king on 5 October fell during this time, students of the University of Leipzig planned to perform a procession with torches and evening music on that day. The cantata text was written by Johann Christoph Clauder. He refers to the events of the last months. While other congratulatory cantatas often use allegorical figures, this work concentrates on the king and his qualities. When Augustus II the Strong died, August III followed him as both elector and king, but had to secure the throne against partisans of Stanisław I Leszczyński.

Bach composed the music, probably in no more than three days. He used the first movement of his 1732 cantata Es lebe der König, der Vater im Lande, BWV Anh 11, set for two four part choirs, as a basis for the opening chorus. The former work, whose music has not survived, had been composed in 1732 for the Namenstag (name day) of the previous elector August II. It seems likely that Bach also used other earlier music, but no specific pieces have been identified.

A chronicle of Leipzig written by Johann Salomon Riemer reports the performance of the cantata on 5 October, in front of the Apel House, the Elector's palace in Leipzig, after a torch-light procession of six hundred students. The Elector and his family remained at the window as long as the music lasted and were pleased ("herzlich wohlgefallen"). 700 copies of the text were printed. The following day, the chronicle reports the death from a stroke of the trumpeter Gottfried Reiche, "Senior der Mus. Stadt Compagnie" (senior of the town music company), who had played first trumpet in the cantata. Possibly "over-exertion and/or the inhalation of smoke from the torches" played a role.

Bach used the seventh movement, the soprano aria Durch die von Eifer entflammeten Waffen, as the basis for a bass aria in his Christmas Oratorio, Part V, Erleucht auch meine finstre Sinnen. He used the first movement as the basis for the "Osanna" of his Mass in B minor.

== Scoring and structure ==
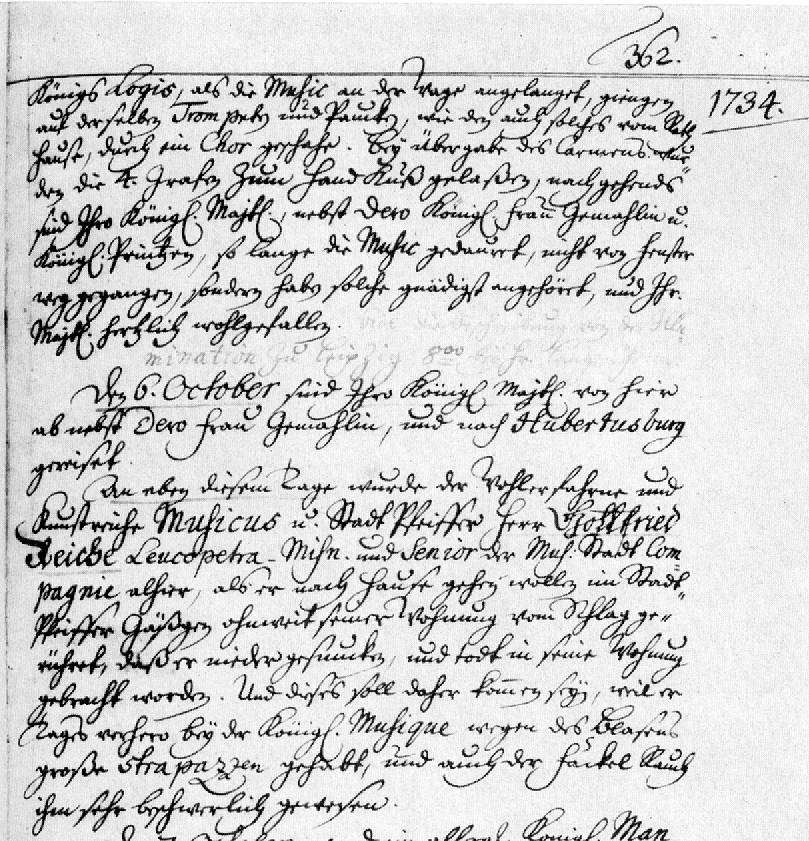
Chronicle of Leipzig for 5 and 6 October 1734

The cantata in nine movements is scored for three soloists, soprano, tenor and bass, two four-part choirs, and a festive orchestra of three trumpets and timpani, two flauto traverso, two oboes, two violins, viola and basso continuo.

1. Chorus: Preise dein Glücke, gesegnetes Sachsen
2. Recitative (tenor): Wie kommen wir, großmächtigster August
3. Aria (tenor): Freilich trotzt Augustus' Name
4. Recitative (bass): Was hat dich sonst, Sarmatien, bewogen
5. Aria (bass): Rase nur, verwegner Schwarm
6. Recitative (soprano): Ja, ja! Gott ist uns noch mit seiner Hülfe nah
7. Aria (soprano): Durch die von Eifer entflammeten Waffen
8. Recitative (soprano, tenor, bass): Laß doch, o teurer Landesvater, zu
9. Chorus: Stifter der Reiche, Beherrscher der Kronen

== Music ==
The opening chorus employs a double choir, unique in Bach's surviving cantatas. The movement begins with an instrumental ritornello and is in da capo form. The choir enters in a unison statement. While the model (Es lebe der König) had an upbeat of one note, it is a run of four notes here. The voices change between unison, homophonic seven-part sections and imitation. Musicologist Julian Mincham notes that Bach "makes great play of the dramatic interjections of one choir, often using the initial motive, against the uninterrupted flowing counterpoint of the other". The trumpets are silent in the middle section, where "Bach continues to play the two choirs off against each other before they unite, as the people are encouraged to do, at the end of this section".

In the following two movements, recitative and aria, the tenor is accompanied by two oboes. The aria suggests the "aggression of war". The bass aria is a "rage aria" like in an opera seria. A soprano aria, accompanied by two flutes, appeals to the "king's grace, mercy and love for his subjects". All three soloists participate in a final recitative. The closing chorus provides "cheerful but undemanding conclusions".

== Selected recordings ==
- J.S. Bach: Kantate BWV 215 · Sinfonien aus Kantaten, Helmuth Rilling, Gächinger Kantorei, Figuralchor der Gedächtniskirche Stuttgart, Bach-Collegium Stuttgart, Erna Spoorenberg, Werner Krenn, Erich Wenk, Cantate-Musicaphon 1966
- J.S. Bach: Kantaten Preise dein Glücke, gesegnetes Sachsen BWV 215; Dem Gerechten muß das Licht BWV 195, Karl-Friedrich Beringer, Windsbacher Knabenchor, Collegium Musicum of the Westdeutscher Rundfunk, Barbara Schlick, Paul Elliott, Stephen Varcoe, Rondeau Production 1986
- J.S. Bach: Complete Cantatas Vol. 4, Ton Koopman, Amsterdam Baroque Orchestra & Choir, Els Bongers, Paul Agnew, Klaus Mertens, Antoine Marchand 1996
- Bach: Secular Cantatas BWV 208 & 215, Gustav Leonhardt, Choir & Orchestra of the Age of Enlightenment, Monika Frimmer, John Elwes, David Wilson-Johnson, Philips 1996

== Sources ==
- Preise dein Glücke, gesegnetes Sachsen, BWV 215 (Bach, Johann Sebastian): Scores at the International Music Score Library Project
- "Preise dein Glücke, gesegnetes Sachsen BWV 215; BC G 21 / Secular cantata". Leipzig University.
- Cantata BWV 215 Preise dein Glücke, gesegnetes Sachsen: history, scoring, sources for text and music, translations to various languages, discography, discussion, bach-cantatas website
- Preise dein Glücke, gesegnetes Sachsen: history, scoring, Bach website (in German)
- BWV 215 Preise dein Glücke, gesegnetes Sachsen: English translation, University of Vermont
- BWV 215 Preise dein Glücke, gesegnetes Sachsen: text, scoring, University of Alberta
