= Schloßplatz (Dresden) =

Square in Dresden, Germany

Coordinates: 51°3′13″N 13°44′18″E

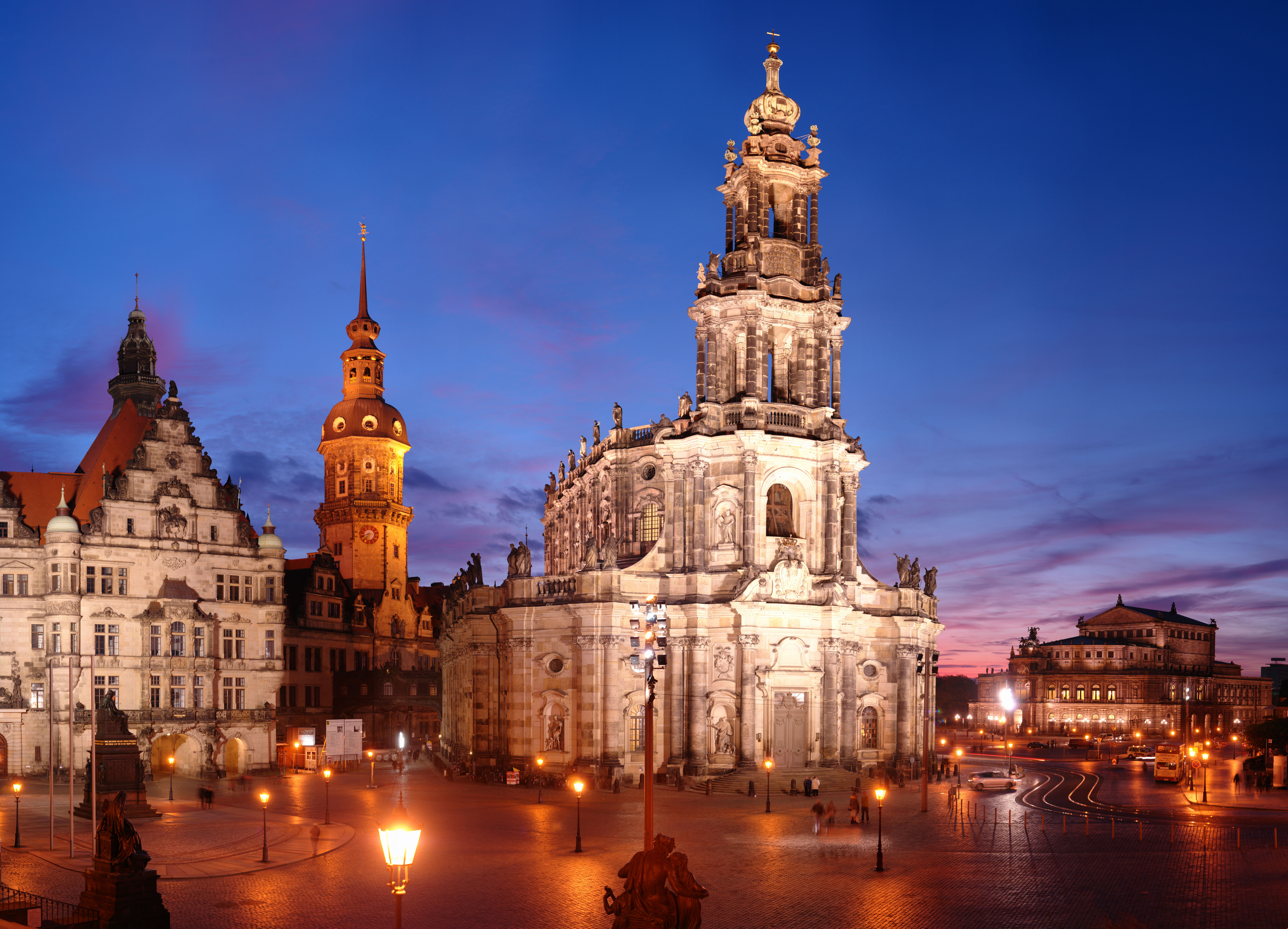
The Schloßplatz at night

The Schloßplatz (German pronunciation: [ˈʃlɔsˌplats], "Palace Square" or "Castle Square") is a city square in the center of Dresden, Saxony, Germany. It gets its name from the Dresdner Schloss, the royal residence of the Electors and Kings of Saxony, which faces the south side of the square. The Schloßplatz is further bounded by the Katholische Hofkirche, the Sächsische Ständehaus, the Georgentor, and Augustus Bridge the over the River Elbe. Dating from the 15th century, the square was destroyed in Bombing of Dresden in World War II. In recent years the buildings surrounding the square have largely been restored so that the area again has a historic character.

== Monuments ==
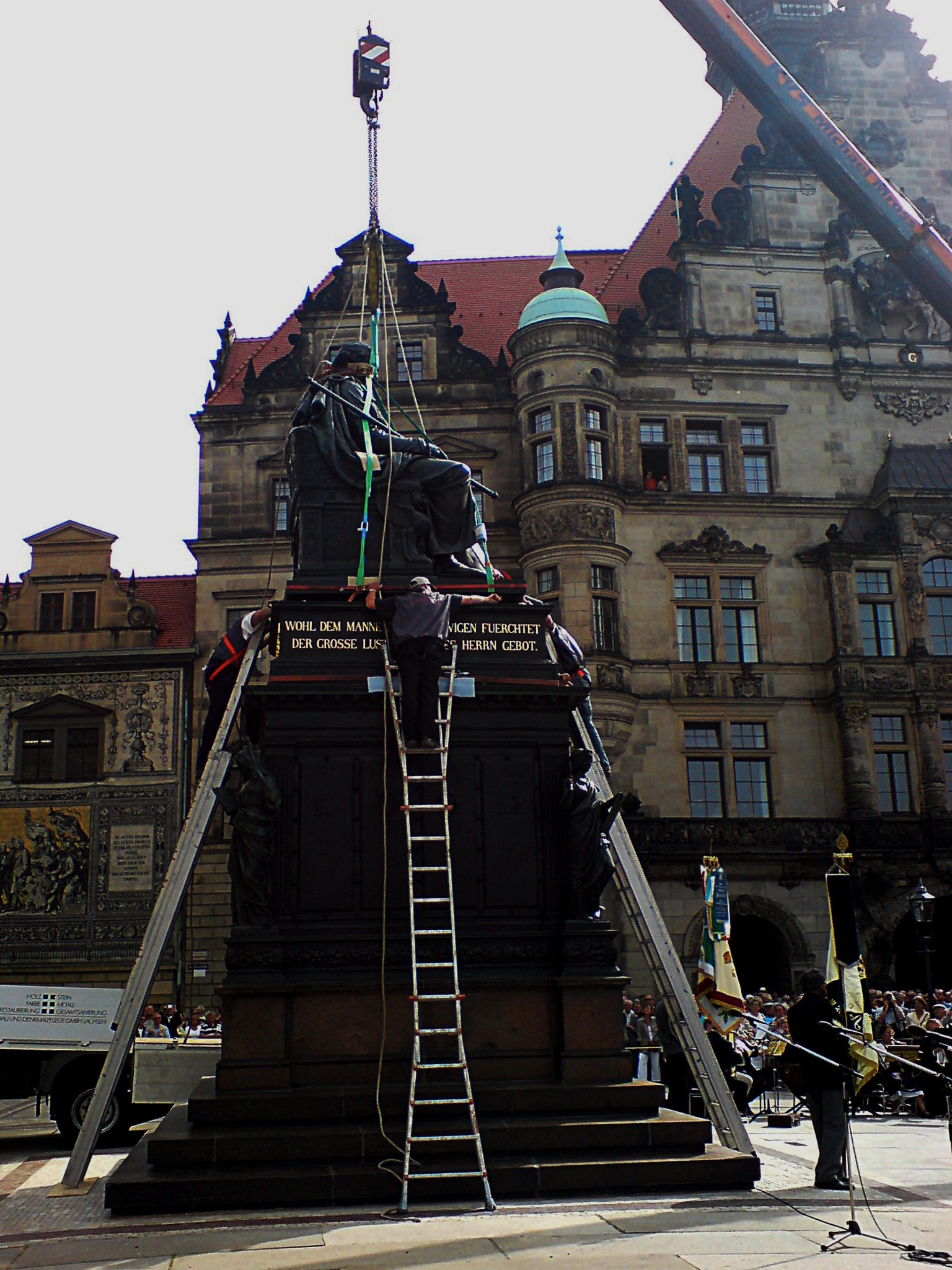
Installation of the Frederick Augustus statue, 2008

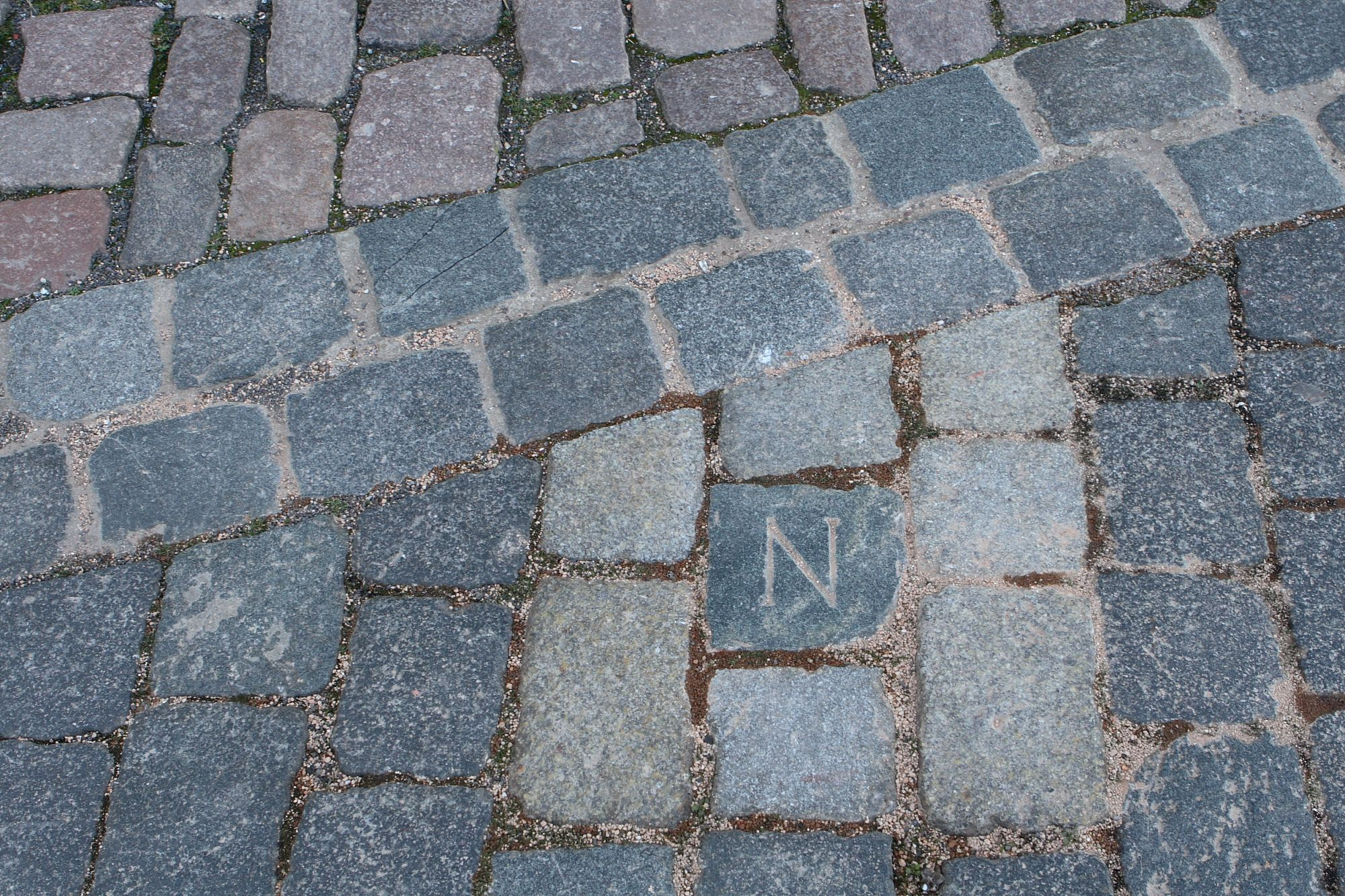
The Napoleon stone

=== King Albert Memorial ===
A bronze statue of Albert of Saxony by sculptor Max Baumbach was inaugurated in 1906 in front of the Georgentor and was melted in 1945 after being severely damaged. Stone friezes on the base were restored in 1990 on the original site.

=== Monument to Friedrich August ===
A sculpture by Ernst Rietschel of Frederick Augustus I "The Righteous" in seated position now stands on the site of the old Albert statue. This monument had been located at the Dresden Zwinger since 1843, and later was moved to the Japanisches Palais. Through the efforts of the city, the Saxon Academy of Fine Arts, and private sponsors it was moved to this prominent spot in 2008. The consecration on 29 May 2008 included a performance of the Weih-Hymne by Richard Wagner, who had composed the piece on the occasion of the sculpture's original unveiling in 1843.

=== Napoleon stone ===
Outside the main entrance of the Katholische Hofkirche is a paving stone marked with an N. This indicates the spot where Napoleon Bonaparte paraded his troops and set off for the Battle of Dresden on August 26, 1813, in which he was victorious.

== Use today ==
In addition to theatre square, the Castle Square is used for political events during election campaigns. Since the stone buildings in close quarters cause much reverberation, concerts take place at the nearby Theaterplatz, which is more spacious and has such a better acoustics.

== See also ==
- Semperoper
