= Es lebe der König, der Vater im Lande, BWV Anh. 11 =

Lost 1732 secular cantata by J S Bach

Es lebe der König, der Vater im Lande
- BWV Anh. 11
- Secular cantata by J. S. Bach
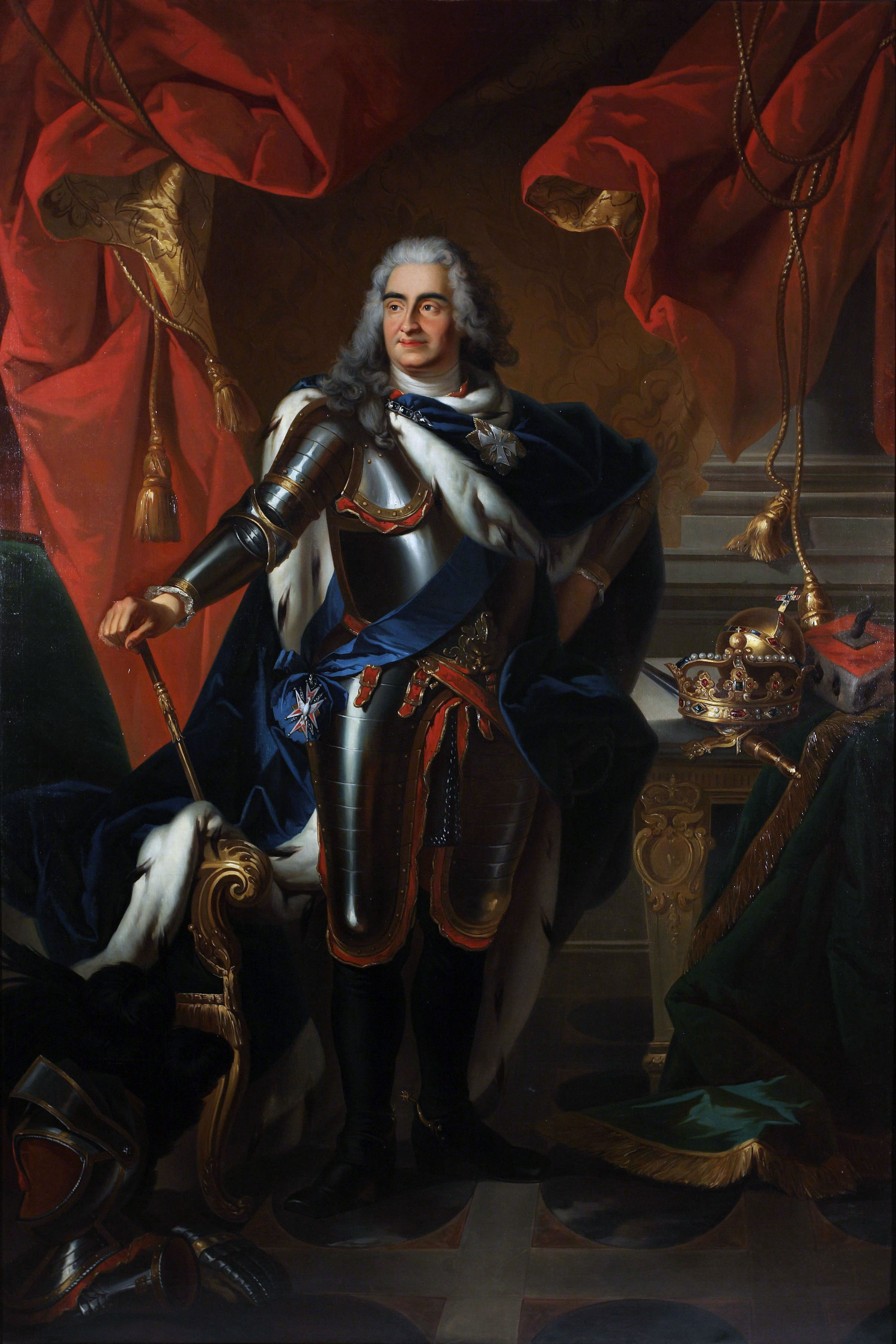
- The Elector Frederick Augustus I (better known as Augustus II the Strong) for whose name day the cantata was written
- Composed: 1732

Es lebe der König, der Vater im Lande (Long live the King, the father of the country), BWV Anh. 11, (Note: "BWV" is Bach-Werke-Verzeichnis, a thematic catalogue of Bach's works.) is a secular cantata by J. S. Bach to a text by Picander. The work was composed in Leipzig for the name day of the Elector of Saxony, and first performed on 3 August 1732. The music is lost. Picander's text was published in Ernst-Schertzhaffte und Satyrische Gedichte, Teil IV (Leipzig, 1737).

The first movement was likely used as a model for the opening chorus of Preise dein Glücke, gesegnetes Sachsen, BWV 215, a work that Bach composed at short notice in 1734. BWV 215 is scored for double choir and festive orchestra with trumpets and timpani.

The cantata is counted among the works for celebrations of the Leipzig University, Festmusiken zu Leipziger Universitätsfeiern.
