= List of secular cantatas by Johann Sebastian Bach =

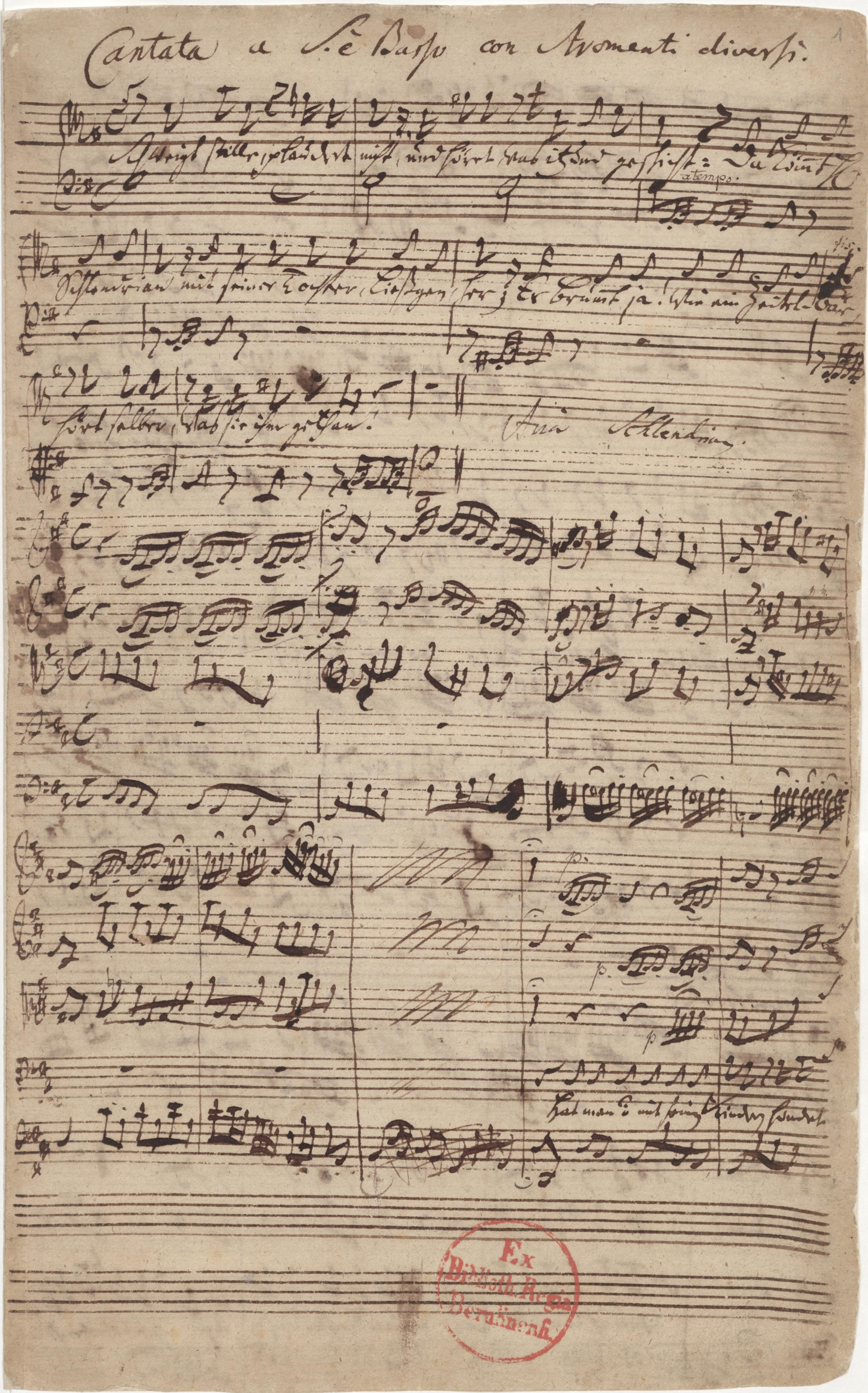
Bach's autograph score of the Coffee Cantata (c. 1734)

Apart from his hundreds of church cantatas, Johann Sebastian Bach wrote secular cantatas in Weimar, Köthen and Leipzig, for instance for members of the Royal-Polish and Prince-electoral Saxonian family (e.g. Trauer-Ode), or other public or private occasions (e.g. Hunting Cantata). The text of these cantatas was occasionally in dialect (e.g. Peasant Cantata) or in Italian (e.g. Amore traditore). Many of the secular cantatas were lost, but for some of these the text and the occasion are known, for instance when Picander later published their libretto (e.g. BWV Anh. 11–12). Some of the secular cantatas had a plot carried by mythological figures of Greek antiquity (e.g. Der Streit zwischen Phoebus und Pan), others were almost miniature buffo operas (e.g. Coffee Cantata).

Extant secular cantatas are published in the New Bach Edition (Neue Bach-Ausgabe, NBA), Series I, volumes 35 to 40, with the two Italian cantatas included in volume 41. The Bach Digital website lists 50 secular cantatas by Bach. Less than half of Bach's known secular cantatas survive with music. For most of the others at least the libretto survives. Some of the secular cantatas are based on music Bach had composed at an earlier date (e.g. some music of the first Brandenburg Concerto was adopted in a secular cantata), and Bach quite often parodied secular cantatas into church music: for instance his Christmas Oratorio opens with music originally written for a secular cantata.

In the Bach-Werke-Verzeichnis (BWV) the range of Nos. 201 to 216a contains mostly extant secular cantatas. Other secular cantatas are in the range of the church cantatas (BWV 1–200), most of them with an "a", "b" or "c" index added to the number of a church cantata while the cantatas share the same music. The same applies for the secular cantata precursors of the Easter Oratorio. Other secular cantatas are listed in BWV Anh. I, that is the appendix of the lost works. Even for these cantatas the music can sometimes be reconstructed, based on the church cantatas that were derived from them.

== History ==
Bach's earliest cantatas are church cantatas, although his early Wedding Quodlibet is sometimes grouped with the secular cantatas. The oldest extant secular cantata is from his Weimar period where he composed the Hunting Cantata (BWV 208, first version) for the birthday of Christian, Duke of Saxe-Weissenfels on 23 February 1713. The libretto was written by Salomon Franck. A few years later, the cantata was performed again, in a modified version, for his employer Ernest Augustus I, Duke of Saxe-Weimar-Eisenach.

In his Köthen period, Bach wrote congratulatory cantatas for his new employer, Leopold, Prince of Anhalt-Köthen, usually on the Prince's birthday, or for New Year. BWV 66a, 134a, Anh. 6, Anh. 7, 184a, 173a and Anh. 8 are examples of such cantatas, the oldest of which were composed on a libretto by Christian Friedrich Hunold. Up to this point Bach's secular cantatas are generally in the Serenata format, lighthearted music with allegorical characters conversing about the excellence of the employer, and expressing their best wishes.

A secular wedding cantata, BWV 202, an Italian cantata (BWV 203), and the secular model for the Störmthal cantata BWV 194 probably originated around the same period. From 1723 until his death in 1750 Bach was employed as Thomaskantor in Leipzig: the bulk of his around 20 extant secular cantatas originated in this period. Bach's earliest known secular cantata on a libretto by Picander dates from 1725. Bach wrote or re-staged at least 36 secular cantatas in the last 25 years of his life, and around half of these were on librettos by Picander.

Occasions for Bach's secular cantatas written in Leipzig included Birthdays and name days for successive prince-electors of Saxony and other rulers, and their relatives, of principalities and duchies in Saxony, and similar occasions for academics of the university of Leipzig. Bach wrote sacred cantatas for funerals and weddings: he also wrote a few secular works for such occasions. In his Leipzig period part of Bach's secular cantata production is no longer in the Serenata format, but rather dramma per musica, implying a dramatic plot beyond mythological figures congratulating or paying homage to the person in whose honour the cantata was written.

== Numerical and alphabetical ==
The BWV numbers assigned to the secular cantatas are random with regard to chronology and occasion. In the Bach Compendium (BC), the secular cantatas are part of series G. That series also includes two cantatas known from very scant sources (Nos. 49 and 52), insufficient to determine whether they were intended as sacred or secular.

Secular cantatas by Johann Sebastian Bach
| BWV^{2a} | BWV^{3} | BC | Text incipit | Other title | BDW |
|---|---|---|---|---|---|
| 30a | 30.1 | G 31 | Angenehmes Wiederau, freue dich in deinen Auen | | 00039 |
| 36a | 36.2 | G 12 | Steigt freudig in die Luft | | 00049 |
| 36b | 36.3 | G 38 | Die Freude reget sich | | 00050 |
| 36c | 36.1 | G 35 | Schwingt freudig euch empor | | 00051 |
| 66a | 66.1 | G 4 | Der Himmel dacht auf Anhalts Ruhm und Glück | Serenata | 00083 |
| 134a | 134.1 | G 5 | Die Zeit, die Tag und Jahre macht | Serenata | 00166 |
| 173a | 173.1 | G 9 | Durchlauchtster Leopold | | 00211 |
| 184a | 184.1 | G 8 | | Fragment | 00223 |
| 193a | 193.1 | G 15 | Ihr Häuser des Himmels, ihr scheinenden Lichter | | 00235 |
| 194a | 194.1 | G 11 | | Fragment | 00239 |
| 198 | | G 34 | Lass, Fürstin, lass noch einen Strahl | Mourning Ode | 00246 |
| 201 | | G 46 | Geschwinde, geschwinde, ihr wirbelnden Winde | The Dispute between Phoebus and Pan | 00251 |
| 202 | | G 41 | Weichet nur, betrübte Schatten | | 00252 |
| 203 | | G 51 | Amore traditore | | 00253 |
| 204 | | G 45 | Ich bin in mir vergnügt | On Contentedness | 00254 |
| 205 | 205.1 | G 36 | Zerreißet, zersprenget, zertrümmert die Gruft | Aeolus Placated; Dramma per musica | 00255 |
| 205a | 205.2 | G 20 | Blast Lärmen, ihr Feinde! Verstärket die Macht | Dramma per musica | 00256 |
| 206 | 206.1 | G 23 | Schleicht, spielende Wellen | Dramma per musica | 00257 |
| 206 | 206.2 | G 26 | Schleicht, spielende Wellen | Dramma per musica | 00258 |
| 207 | 207.1 | G 37 | Vereinigte Zwietracht der wechselnden Saiten | Dramma per musica | 00259 |
| 207a | 207.2 | G 22 | Auf, schmetternde Töne der muntern Trompeten | Dramma per musica | 00260 |
| 208 | 208.1 | G 1 | Was mir behagt, ist nur die muntre Jagd | Hunting Cantata | 00261 |
| 208a | 208.2 | G 3 | Was mir behagt, ist nur die muntre Jagd | Hunting Cantata | 00262 |
| 208a | 208.3 | G 27 | Was mir behagt, ist nur die muntre Jagd | Hunting Cantata | 00263 |
| 209 | | G 50 | Non sa che sia dolore | | 00264 |
| 210 | 210.2 | G 44 | O holder Tag, erwünschte Zeit | | 00265 |
| 210a | 210.1 | G 29 | O angenehme Melodei | Fragment | 00266 |
| 211 | | G 48 | Schweigt stille, plaudert nicht | Coffee Cantata | 00267 |
| 212 | | G 32 | Mer hahn en neue Oberkeet | Peasant Cantata; Cantate en burlesque | 00268 |
| 213 | | G 18 | Lasst uns sorgen, lasst uns wachen | Hercules at the Crossroads; Dramma per musica | 00269 |
| 214 | | G 19 | Tönet, ihr Pauken! Erschallet, Trompeten! | | 00270 |
| 215 | | G 21 | Preise dein Glücke, gesegnetes Sachsen | | 00271 |
| 216 | 216.1 | G 43 | Vergnügte Pleißenstadt | Fragment | 00272 |
| 216a | 216.2 | G 47 | Erwählte Pleißenstadt | Apollo and Mercurius | 00273 |
| 249a | 249.1 | G 2 | Entfliehet, verschwindet, entweichet ihr Sorgen | Shepherd Cantata | 00318 |
| 249b | 249.2 | G 28 | Verjaget, zerstreuet, zerrüttet, ihr Sterne | The Celebration of Genius | 00319 |
| Anh. 6 | 1151 | G 6 | Dich loben die lieblichen Strahlen der Sonne | | 01314 |
| Anh. 7 | 1153 | G 7 | Heut ist gewiss ein guter Tag | | 01315 |
| Anh. 8 | 1152 | G 10 | | Congratulation cantata | 01316 |
| Anh. 9 | 1156 | G 14 | Entfernet euch, ihr heitern Sterne | | 01317 |
| Anh. 10 | 1160 | G 30 | So kämpfet nur, ihr muntern Töne | | 01318 |
| Anh. 11 | 1157 | G 16 | Es lebe der König, der Vater im Lande | | 01319 |
| Anh. 12 | 1158 | G 17 | Frohes Volk, vergnügte Sachsen | | 01320 |
| Anh. 13 | 1161 | G 24 | Willkommen! Ihr herrschenden Götter der Erden | | 01321 |
| Anh. 18 | 1162 | G 39 | Froher Tag, verlangte Stunden | | 01326 |
| Anh. 19 | | G 40 | Thomana saß annoch betrübt | | 01327 |
| Anh. 20 | 1155 | G 33 | | Latin ode | 01328 |
| Anh. 195 | | G 13 | Murmelt nur, ihr heitern Bäche | | 01506 |
| Anh. 196 | 1163 | G 42 | Auf, süß-entzückende Gewalt | | 01507 |
| Anh. 197 | 1150 | G 52 | Ihr wallenden Wolken | Cantata | 01508 |
| deest | 1159 | G 25 | | Serenade | 01536 |
| deest | | G 49 | | Outline | 01537 |

=== By text incipit ===
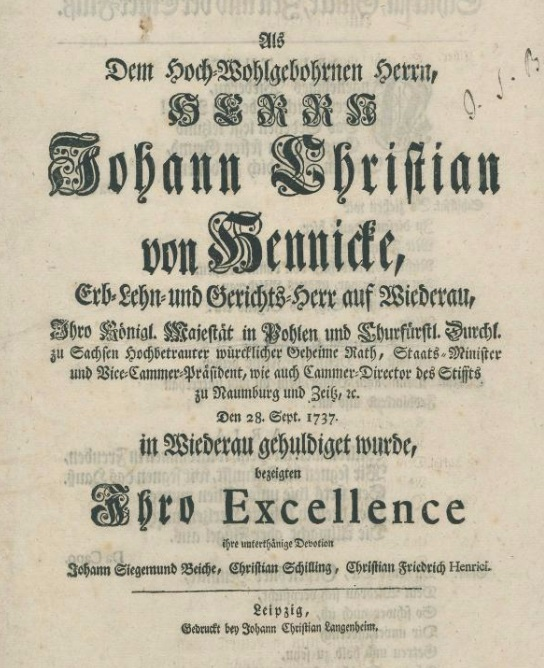
Title page of the printed libretto of Angenehmes Wiederau, BWV 30.1 (1737).

Most of the secular cantatas are named after the first words of the libretto (incipit):

- Amore traditore, BWV 203 (c.1720?)
- Angenehmes Wiederau, BWV 30a (28 September 1737, text probably by Picander)
- Auf, schmetternde Töne der muntern Trompeten, BWV 207a (3 August 1735)
- Auf, süß-entzückende Gewalt, BWV Anh. 196 (27 November 1725, music lost, text by C. Gottsched)
- Blast Lärmen, ihr Feinde, BWV 205a (19 February 1734)
- Der Himmel dacht auf Anhalts Ruhm und Glück, BWV 66a (10 December 1718, music largely lost, text by Christian Friedrich Hunold)
- Dich loben die lieblichen Strahlen der Sonne, BWV Anh. 6 (1 January 1720, music lost, text by Christian Friedrich Hunold)
- Die Freude reget sich, BWV 36b (27 July 1735, music partially lost, text possibly by Picander)
- Die Zeit, die Tag und Jahre macht, BWV 134a (1 January 1719, music reconstructed after BWV 134, text by Christian Friedrich Hunold)
- Durchlauchtster Leopold, BWV 173a (10 December 1722?)
- Entfernet euch, ihr heitern Sterne, BWV Anh. 9 (12 May 1727, music lost, text by Christian Friedrich Haupt)
- Entfliehet, verschwindet, entweichet, ihr Sorgen, BWV 249a (23 February 1725, music partially lost)
- Erwählte Pleißenstadt, BWV 216a (1728–1731, music partially reconstructable based on BWV 216, text by C. G. Meißner?)
- Es lebe der König, der Vater im Lande, BWV Anh. 11 (3 August 1732, music lost, text by Picander)
- Froher Tag, verlangte Stunden, BWV Anh. 18 (5 June 1732, music lost, text by Johann Heinrich Winckler)
- Frohes Volk, vergnügte Sachsen, BWV Anh. 12 (3 August 1733, music lost, text by Picander)
- Geschwinde, ihr wirbelnden Winde, BWV 201 (c.1729, text by Picander)
- Heut ist gewiss ein guter Tag, BWV Anh. 7 (10 December 1720, music lost, text by Christian Friedrich Hunold)
- Ich bin in mir vergnügt, BWV 204 (1726–1727, text by Christian Friedrich Hunold)
- Ihr Häuser des Himmels, ihr scheinenden Lichter, BWV 193a (3 August 1727, music lost, text by Picander)
- Laß, Fürstin, laß noch einen Strahl, BWV 198 (17 October 1727, text by Johann Christoph Gottsched)
- Laßt uns sorgen, laßt uns wachen, BWV 213 (5 September 1733, text by Picander)
- Mer hahn en neue Oberkeet, BWV 212 (30 August 1742, text by Picander)
- Murmelt nur, ihr heitern Bäche, BWV Anh. 195 (9 June 1723, music lost, text published in 1723)
- Non sa che sia dolore, BWV 209 (1747?)
- O angenehme Melodei, BWV 210a (12 January 1729, fragment)
- O holder Tag, erwünschte Zeit, BWV 210 (19 September 1741)
- Preise dein Glücke, gesegnetes Sachsen, BWV 215 (5 October 1734, text by Johann Christoph Clauder)
- Schleicht, spielende Wellen, BWV 206 (two versions: 7 October 1736, or 1734, and 3 August 1740)
- Schweigt stille, plaudert nicht, BWV 211 (c.1734, text by Picander)
- Schwingt freudig euch empor, BWV 36c (1725?)
- So kämpfet nur, ihr muntern Töne, BWV Anh. 10 (25 August 1731, music largely lost, text by Picander)
- Steigt freudig in die Luft, BWV 36a (30 November 1726?, music largely lost, text by Picander)
- Thomana saß annoch betrübt, BWV Anh. 19 (21 November 1734, music lost, text probably by Johann August Landvoigt)
- Tönet, ihr Pauken! Erschallet, Trompeten! BWV 214 (8 December 1733, text by Picander)
- Vereinigte Zwietracht der wechselnden Saiten, BWV 207 (11 December 1726)
- Vergnügte Pleißenstadt, BWV 216 (5 February 1728, incomplete, text by Picander)
- Verjaget, zerstreuet, zerrüttet, ihr Sterne, BWV 249b (25 August 1726, music lost, text by Picander)
- Was mir behagt, ist nur die muntre Jagd, BWV 208 and 208a (three versions: 23 February 1713, c.1715 and 3 August 1742, text by Salomon Franck)
- Weichet nur, betrübte Schatten, BWV 202 (c.1718?)
- Willkommen! Ihr herrschenden Götter der Erden, BWV Anh. 13 (28 April 1738, music lost, text by Johann Christoph Gottsched)
- Zerreißet, zersprenget, zertrümmert die Gruft, BWV 205 (3 August 1725, text by Picander)

=== Other titles ===
"Schafe können sicher weiden" from Hunting Cantata (1713).
9. "Sheep May Safely Graze" (arr.)
Arrangement for Celesta, Harp, Vibe and Marimba by Kevin MacLeod (original aria for soprano, two recorders and continuo)

- Aeolus Placated, The Placating of Aeolus (Der zufriedengestellte Äolus) → Zerreißet, zersprenget, zertrümmert die Gruft, BWV 205
- Apollo and Mercurius (Apollo et Mercurius) → Erwählte Pleißenstadt, BWV 216a
- Coffee Cantata (Kaffee-Kantate) → Schweigt stille, plaudert nicht, BWV 211
- The Celebration of Genius (Die Feier des Genius) → Verjaget, zerstreuet, zerrüttet, ihr Sterne, BWV 249b
- The Dispute between Phoebus and Pan (Der Streit zwischen Phoebus und Pan); Phoebus and Pan → Geschwinde, ihr wirbelnden Winde, BWV 201
- Flow Gently, Fair Rivers! (Schleicht, spielende Wellen! BWV 206)
- Hercules at the Crossroads (Herkules am Scheidewege); The Choice of Hercules (Die Wahl des Herkules) → Laßt uns sorgen, laßt uns wachen, BWV 213
- Hunting Cantata, also Hunt Cantata (Jagdkantate) → Was mir behagt, ist nur die muntre Jagd, BWV 208–208a
- A Merry Contest of the Gods (Frohlockender Götterstreit) → Was mir behagt, ist nur die muntre Jagd, BWV 208–208a
- Mourning Ode (Trauer-Ode or Trauerode), also Funeral Ode, Ode of Mourning → Laß, Fürstin, laß noch einen Strahl, BWV 198
- On Contentedness (Von der Vergnügsamkeit) → Ich bin in mir vergnügt, BWV 204
- Peal, Shattering Fanfares! (Auf, schmetternde Töne! BWV 207a)
- Peasant Cantata (Bauern-Kantate), also Burlesque Cantata (Cantate burlesque) → Mer hahn en neue Oberkeet, BWV 212
- Pleasant Fields of Wiederau (Angenehmes Wiederau, BWV 30a)
- Praise thy Good Fortune! (Preise dein Glücke! BWV 215)
- "Sheep may safely graze" ("Schafe können sicher weiden"), 9th movement of the Hunting Cantata → Was mir behagt, ist nur die muntre Jagd, BWV 208
- Shepherds' Cantata (Schäferkantate) → Entfliehet, verschwindet, entweichet, ihr Sorgen, BWV 249a
- Sweet Voices Harmonious (Vereinigte Zwietracht, BWV 207)
- Thunder, ye Drum-Rolls! (Tönet, ihr Pauken! BWV 214)
- We've got a new squire (Mer hahn en neue Oberkeet, BWV 212)

=== No title extant ===
- BWV 184a: secular cantata for New Year (1 January 1721, fragment)
- BWV 194a: secular cantata model for BWV 194 (1717–1723?, text and most of the music lost)
- BWV Anh. 8: congratulation cantata for New Year (1 January 1723, lost)
- BWV Anh. 20: Latin ode (9 August 1723, lost: mentioned in contemporary newspapers)
- BWV deest: Serenade (7 October 1739, lost: mentioned in contemporary newspapers)

== Chronological and by occasion ==
The New Bach Edition groups the secular cantatas in the last seven volumes of Series I.

Bach's secular cantatas by date and occasion
| Date | Place | BWV | Title | Librettist | Occasion | BDW |
|---|---|---|---|---|---|---|
| 1713-02-27 | Weißenfels | 208.1 | Hunting Cantata | Franck | Birthday (Christian of Saxe-Weissenfels) | 00261 |
| 1713-10-30 | Weimar | 1127 | Strophic aria | Mylius | Birthday (Wilhelm Ernst of Saxe-Weimar) | 01307 |
| 1716? | Weimar | 208.2 | Hunting Cantata | Franck | Congratulation (Ernst August of Saxe-Weimar) | 00262 |
| 1718-12-10 | Köthen | 66.1 | Der Himmel dacht ... | Menantes | Birthday (Leopold of Anhalt-Köthen) | 00083 |
| 1718–1719 | Köthen | 203 | Amore traditore | ? | Concert with bass Riemschneider? | 00253 |
| 1719-01-01 | Köthen | 134.1 | Die Zeit, die Tag und ... | Menantes | New Year's wishes for Leopold of Anhalt-Köthen | 00166 |
| 1720-01-01 | Köthen | 1151 | Dich loben die ... | Menantes | New Year's wishes for Leopold of Anhalt-Köthen | 01314 |
| 1717–1723? | Köthen? | 202 | Weichet nur, ... | ? | Wedding? | 00252 |
| 1720-12-10 | Köthen | 1153 | Heut ist gewiss ... | Menantes | Birthday (Leopold of Anhalt-Köthen) | 01315 |
| 1721–1722 | Köthen | 1150 | Ihr wallenden Wolken | ? | New Year's wishes for Leopold of Anhalt-Köthen | 01508 |
| 1717–1723 | Köthen | 184.1 | ? | ? | Likely congratulation of Leopold of Anhalt-Köthen | 00223 |
| 1717–1723 | Köthen | 194.1 | ? | ? | Likely congratulation of Leopold of Anhalt-Köthen | 00239 |
| 1722-12-10 | Köthen | 173.1 | Durchlauchtster ... | ? | Birthday (Leopold of Anhalt-Köthen) | 00211 |
| 1723-01-01 | Köthen | 1152 | Congratulation cantata | ? | New Year's wishes for Leopold of A-K and his wife | 01316 |
| 1723-06-09 | Leipzig | Anh. 195 | Murmelt nur, ... | ? | Academic celebration | 01506 |
| 1723-08-09 | Leipzig | 1155 | Latin ode | ? | Academic session, speech for Frederick II of S-G-A | 01328 |
| 1725-02-23 | Weißenfels | 249.1 | Shepherd Cantata | Picander | Birthday (Christian of Saxe-Weissenfels) | 00318 |
| 1725-04–05 | Leipzig | 36.1 | Schwingt freudig ... | Picander? | Birthday of an academic (Mencke?) | 00051 |
| 1725-08-03 | Leipzig | 205.1 | Aeolus Placated | Picander | Name day of an academic (Müller) | 00255 |
| 1725-11-27 | Leipzig | 1163 | Auf, süß-entzückende | Gottsched | Wedding (P. Hohman jr. x C. S. Mencke) | 01507 |
| 1726-08-25 | Leipzig | 249.2 | Celebration of Genius | Picander | Birthday (von Flemming) | 00319 |
| 1726-11-30 | Köthen | 36.2 | Steigt freudig ... | Picander | Birthday (Leopold of A-K's wife Charlotte Friederike) | 00049 |
| 1726-12-11 | Leipzig | 207.1 | Vereinigte Zwietracht | ? | Tenure start of an academic (Kortte) | 00259 |
| 1726–1727 | Leipzig | 204 | On Contentedness | Menantes | Hausmusik? | 00254 |
| 1727-05-12 | Leipzig | 1156 | Entfernet euch, ... | Haupt | Birthday (Augustus II) | 01317 |
| 1727-08-03 | Leipzig | 193.1 | Ihr Häuser des ... | Picander | Name day (Augustus II) | 00235 |
| 1727-10-17 | Leipzig | 198 | Mourning Ode | Gottsched | Memorial (Augustus II's wife Christiane Eberhardine) | 00246 |
| 1728-02-05 | Leipzig | 216.1 | Vergnügte Pleißenstadt | Picander | Wedding (J. H. Wolff x S. R. Hempel) | 00272 |
| 1729-01-12 | Leipzig | 210.1 | O angenehme Melodei | ? | Homage (Christian of Saxe-Weissenfels) | 00266 |
| Fall 1729 | Leipzig | 201 | Phoebus and Pan | Picander | Concert by Collegium Musicum | 00251 |
| c. 1728–1731 | Leipzig | 216.2 | Apollo and Mercurius | Picander, ? | Homage (Leipzig, city of science and commerce) | 00273 |
| 1731-04-09? | Leipzig | 36.1 | Schwingt freudig ... | Picander? | Birthday of an academic (Gesner) | 00051 |
| 1731-08-25 | Leipzig | 1160 | So kämpfet nur, ... | Picander | Birthday (von Flemming) | 01318 |
| 1732-06-05 | Leipzig | 1162 | Froher Tag, ... | Winckler | Inauguration of renovated Thomasschule | 01326 |
| 1732-08-03 | Leipzig | 1157 | Es lebe der König | Picander | Name day (Augustus II) | 01319 |
| 1733-08-03 | Leipzig | 1158 | Frohes Volk, ... | Picander | Name day (Augustus III) | 01320 |
| 1733-09-05 | Leipzig | 213 | The Choice of Hercules | Picander | Birthday (Frederick Christian of Saxony) | 00269 |
| 1733-12-08 | Leipzig | 214 | Tönet, ihr Pauken! | ? | Birthday (Augustus III's wife Maria Josepha) | 00270 |
| 1734-02-19 | Leipzig | 205.2 | Blast Lärmen, ... | Picander? | Coronation (Augustus III) | 00256 |
| Mid-1734 | Leipzig | 211 | Coffee Cantata | Picander | Concert in Café Zimmermann? | 00267 |
| 1734-10-05 | Leipzig | 215 | Preise dein Glücke | Clauder | Elected as king (Augustus III) | 00271 |
| 1734-11-21 | Leipzig | Anh. 19 | Thomana saß ... | Landvoigt? | Tenure start (Ernesti as rector of Thomasschule) | 01327 |
| 1735-08-03 | Leipzig | 207.2 | Auf, schmetternde ... | ? | Name day (Augustus III) | 00260 |
| 1736-10-07 | Leipzig | 206.1 | Schleicht, spielende ... | ? | Birthday (Augustus III) | 00257 |
| 1737-09-28 | Wiederau | 30.1 | Angenehmes Wiederau | Picander | Congratulation on acquiring a manor (Hennicke) | 00039 |
| 1737–1738 | Leipzig | 36.3 | Die Freude reget sich | ? | Birthday of an academic (Rivinus) | 00050 |
| 1738-04-28 | Leipzig | 1161 | Willkommen! Ihr ... | Gottsched | Homage (Augustus III & wife; daughter & fiancé) | 01321 |
| 1739-10-07 | Leipzig | 1159 | Serenade | ? | Birthday (Augustus III) | 01536 |
| 1740-08-03 | Leipzig | 206.2 | Schleicht, spielende ... | ? | Name day (Augustus III) | 00258 |
| 1741-09-19 | Berlin | 210.2 | O holder Tag | ? | Wedding (G. E. Stahl jr. x J. E. Schrader) | 00265 |
| 1742-08-03 | Leipzig | 208.3 | Hunting Cantata | Franck, ? | Name day (Augustus III) | 00263 |
| 1742-08-30 | Kleinzschocher | 212 | Peasant Cantata | Picander | Congratulation on acquiring a manor (von Dieskau) | 00268 |
| Early 1747? | Leipzig | 209 | Non sa che sia dolore | Metastasio, ? | Leave-taking of an academic (Beck?) | 00264 |

=== Music for feasts at the courts of Weimar, Weißenfels and Köthen ===
NBA Volume 35 – Festmusiken für die Fürstenhäuser von Weimar, Weißenfels und Köthen:

- Congratulation cantatas included in the volume:
  - BWV 208: Was mir behagt ist nur die muntre Jagd (includes BWV 1040)
  - BWV 134a: Die Zeit, die Tag und Jahre macht
  - BWV 173a: Durchlauchtster Leopold
- Music lost, only described:
  - BWV 249a: Entfliehet, verschwindet, entweichet, ihr Sorgen
  - BWV 66a: Der Himmel dacht auf Anhalts Ruhm und Glück
  - BWV Anh. 6: Dich loben die lieblichen Strahlen der Sonne
  - BWV Anh. 7: Heut ist gewiß ein guter Tag
  - BWV Anh. 8: congratulation cantata for New Year 1723
  - BWV 184a: congratulation cantata?
  - BWV 194a: congratulation cantata?
  - BWV 36a: Steigt freudig in die Luft

=== Music celebrating the Saxonian prince-electoral family ===
NBA Volume 36 – Festmusiken für das Kurfürstlich-Sächsische Haus I:

- Congratulation cantatas included in the volume:
  - BWV 213: Lasst uns sorgen, uns wachen
  - BWV 214: Tönet, ihr Pauken! Erschallet, Trompeten
  - BWV 206: Schleicht, spielende Wellen, und murmelt gelinde
- Music lost, only described:
  - BWV Anh. 9: Entfernet euch, ihr heitern Sterne
  - BWV 193a: Ihr Häuser des Himmels, ihr scheinenden Lichter
  - BWV Anh. 11: Es lebe der König, der Vater im Lande
  - BWV Anh. 12: Frohes Volk, vergnügte Sachsen

NBA Volume 37 – Festmusiken für das Kurfürstlich-Sächsische Haus II:

- Cantatas included in the volume:
  - BWV 207a: Auf, schmetternde Töne der muntern Trompeten (includes an appended march)
  - BWV 215: Preise dein Glücke, gesegnetes Sachsen
- Only described:
  - BWV 205a: Blast Lärmen, ihr Feinde! Verstärket die Macht
  - BWV 208a: Was mir behagt, ist nur die muntre Jagd
  - BWV Anh. 13: Willkommen, ihr herrschenden Götter der Erden

=== Music for celebrations at the Leipzig University ===
NBA Volume 38 – Festmusiken zu Leipziger Universitätsfeiern:

- Cantatas included in the volume:
  - BWV 205: Zerreißet, zersprenget, zertrümmert die Gruft
  - BWV 207: Vereinigte Zwietracht der wechselnden Saiten (includes an appended march)
  - BWV 198: Lass, Fürstin, lass noch einen Strahl
  - BWV 36b: Die Freude reget sich
- Only described:
  - BWV Anh. 20: Lateinische Ode

=== For Leipzig's city council and school; Celebrations of noblemen and civilians ===
NBA Volume 39 – Festmusiken für Leipziger Rats- und Schulfeiern / Huldigungsmusiken für Adelige und Bürger:

- Cantatas included in the volume:
  - BWV 36c: Schwingt freudig euch empor
  - BWV 30a: Angenehmes Wiederau, freue dich in deinen Auen
  - BWV 210a: O angenehme Melodei (incomplete)
  - BWV 212: Mer hahn en neue Oberkeet
- Only described:
  - BWV 216a: Erwählte Pleißenstadt
  - BWV Anh. 18: Froher Tag, verlangte Stunden
  - BWV Anh. 19: Thomana saß annoch betrübt

=== For weddings and diverse occasions ===
NBA Volume 40 – Hochzeitskantaten und Weltliche Kantaten verschiedener Bestimmung:

- Cantatas included in the volume:
  - BWV 202: Weichet nur, betrübte Schatten (wedding)
  - BWV 216: Vergnügte Pleißenstadt (wedding, incomplete)
  - BWV 210: O holder Tag, erwünschte Zeit (wedding)
  - BWV 204: Ich bin in mir vergnügt
  - BWV 201: Geschwinde, ihr wirbelnden Winde
  - BWV 211: Schweigt stille, plaudert nicht
- Music lost, only described:
  - BWV Anh. 196: Auf, süß-entzückende Gewalt

=== Italian cantatas ===
NBA Volume 41, Varia: Kantaten, Quodlibet, Einzelsätze, Bearbeitungen, contains, apart from various pieces of sacred vocal music and the incomplete Quodlibet, Bach's two Italian cantatas:

- BWV 203: Amore traditore
- BWV 209: Non sa che sia dolore

== Extant versions, reconstructions and recordings ==
Complete recordings of the secular cantatas include those by Peter Schreier and Helmuth Rilling. Also Masaaki Suzuki devoted a series of recordings to the secular cantatas.

Bach's secular cantatas: extant versions, reconstructions and adoption in complete recording sets
| Date | BWV | Title | Text | Music | Schreier | Rilling | Suzuki |
|---|---|---|---|---|---|---|---|
| c. Early 1708 | 524 | Wedding Quodlibet | Incomplete (not always grouped with cantatas) | | — | 5 | Vol. 3/IV |
| 1708–1717? | 1046a/1 | Sinfonia in F Major | n/a | Extant (secular cantata link unproven) | — | — | Vol. 2/I |
| 1713-02-27 | 208.1 | Hunting Cantata | Extant | | CD 4/I | 9 | Vol. 2/II |
| 1716? | 208.2 | Hunting Cantata | Extant | =BWV 208.1 | — | — | — |
| 1742-08-03 | 208.3 | Hunting Cantata | Extant | ≈BWV 208.1 | — | — | — |
| 1713-10-30 | 1127 | Strophic aria | Extant (not necessarily grouped with cantatas) | | — | — | — |
| c. 1714? | 53 | Schlage doch, ... | Extant (sacred; attribution to Bach doubtful) | | — | — | Vol. 6/II |
| 1718-12-10 | 66.1 | Der Himmel dacht ... | Extant | Partially reconstructible (BWV 66.2) | — | — | — |
| 1718–1719 | 203 | Amore traditore | Extant | | CD 1/III | 3 | Vol. 7/III |
| 1719-01-01 | 134.1 | Die Zeit, die Tag ... | Extant | | — | 20 | Vol. 2/III |
| 1720-01-01 | 1151 | Dich loben die ... | Extant | Lost | — | — | — |
| 1717–1723? | 202 | Weichet nur, ... | Extant | | CD 3/I | 2 | Vol. 3/II |
| 1720-12-10 | 1153 | Heut ist gewiss ... | Extant | Lost | — | — | — |
| 1717–1723 | 184.1 | ? | Lost | ≈BWV 184.2? | — | — | — |
| 1717–1723 | 194.1 | ? | Lost | Incomplete | — | — | — |
| 1722-12-10 | 173.1 | Durchlauchtster ... | Extant | | — | 21 | Vol. 3/I |
| 1723-06-09 | Anh. 195 | Murmelt nur, ... | Extant | Lost | — | — | — |
| 1725-02-23 | 249.1 | Shepherd Cantata | Extant | Partially reconstructible (BWV 249) | — | — | — |
| 1726-08-25 | 249.2 | Celebration of Genius | Extant | Partially reconstructible (BWV 249) | — | — | — |
| 1725-04–05 | 36.1 | Schwingt freudig ... | Extant | | CD 1/I | 18 | Vol. 3/III |
| 1726-11-30 | 36.2 | Steigt freudig ... | Extant | Partially reconstructible (BWV 36.1) | — | — | — |
| 1737–1738 | 36.3 | Die Freude reget ... | Extant | Reconstructible (BWV 36.1) | — | 19 | — |
| 1725-08-03 | 205.1 | Aeolus Placated | Extant | | CD 5/I | 22 | Vol. 4/I |
| 1734-02-19 | 205.2 | Blast Lärmen, ... | Extant | Partially reconstructible (BWV 205.1) | — | — | — |
| 1725-11-27 | 1163 | Auf, süß-entzückende ... | Extant | Partially reconstructible (BWV 11) | — | — | — |
| 1726-12-11 | 207.1 | Vereinigte Zwietracht | Extant | | CD 5/II | 8 | Vol. 4/II |
| 1735-08-03 | 207.2 | Auf, schmetternde Töne | Extant | | — | 7 | Vol. 9/II |
| 1726–1727 | 204 | On Contentedness | Extant | | CD 4/II | 4 | Vol. 10/II |
| 1727-05-12 | 1156 | Entfernet euch, ... | Extant | Partially reconstructible (BWV 232) | — | — | — |
| 1727-08-03 | 193.1 | Ihr Häuser des Himmels | Extant | Partially reconstructible (BWV 193.2) | — | — | — |
| 1727-10-17 | 198 | Mourning Ode | Extant | | — | — | Vol. 6/I |
| 1728-02-05 | 216.1 | Vergnügte Pleißenstadt | Extant | Incomplete | — | — | — |
| c. 1728–1731 | 216.2 | Apollo and Mercurius | Extant | Partially reconstructible (BWV 216.1) | — | — | — |
| 1729-01-12 | 210.1 | O angenehme Melodei | Extant | Partially reconstructible (BWV 210.2) | — | — | — |
| 1741-09-19 | 210.2 | O holder Tag | Extant | | CD 3/II | 11 | Vol. 1/I |
| Fall 1729 | 201 | Phoebus and Pan | Extant | | CD 2/I | 1 | Vol. 9/I |
| 1731-08-25 | 1160 | So kämpfet nur, ... | Extant | Partially reconstructible (BWV 248^{VI}) | — | — | — |
| 1732-06-05 | 1162 | Froher Tag, ... | Extant | Partially reconstructible (BWV 11) | — | — | — |
| 1732-08-03 | 1157 | Es lebe der König | Extant | Partially reconstructible (BWV 212 a.o.) | — | — | — |
| 1733-08-03 | 1158 | Frohes Volk, ... | Extant | Partially reconstructible (BWV 1162) | — | — | — |
| 1733-09-05 | 213 | The Choice of Hercules | Extant | | CD 8/I | 14 | Vol. 5/I |
| 1733-12-08 | 214 | Tönet, ihr Pauken! | Extant | | CD 8/II | 15 | Vol. 5/II |
| Mid-1734 | 211 | Coffee Cantata | Extant | | CD 7/I | 12 | Vol. 1/II |
| 1734-10-05 | 215 | Preise dein Glücke | Extant | | CD 6/II | 16 | Vol. 8/II |
| 1734-11-21 | Anh. 19 | Thomana saß annoch ... | Extant | Lost | — | — | — |
| 1736-10-07 | 206.1 | Schleicht, spielende ... | Extant | | CD 6/I | 6 | Vol. 8/I |
| 1740-08-03 | 206.2 | Schleicht, spielende ... | Extant | | CD 6/I | 6 | Vol. 8/I |
| 1737-09-28 | 30.1 | Angenehmes Wiederau | Extant | | — | 17 | Vol. 10/I |
| 1738-04-28 | 1161 | Willkommen! Ihr ... | Extant | Lost | — | — | — |
| 1742-08-30 | 212 | Peasant Cantata | Extant | | CD 7/II | 13 | Vol. 7/I |
| 1745–1746 | 1083 | Tilge, Höchster, ... | Extant (sacred; after Pergolesi's Stabat Mater) | | — | — | Vol. 6/III |
| Early 1747? | 209 | Non sa che sia dolore | Extant | | CD 1/II | 10 | Vol. 7/II |

== Sources ==
- Jones, Richard D. P. "Introduction" to Part I: The Cöthen and early Leipzig years, in The Creative Development of Johann Sebastian Bach, Volume II: 1717–1750: Music to Delight the Spirit. Oxford University Press. 2013. ISBN 978-0-19-969628-4.
- Terry, Charles Sanford (1933). "X. The Secular Cantatas" pp. 97–104 in The Music of Bach: An Introduction. London: Oxford University Press
