= Verjaget, zerstreuet, zerrüttet, ihr Sterne, BWV 249b =

Lost cantata by Johann Sebastian Bach

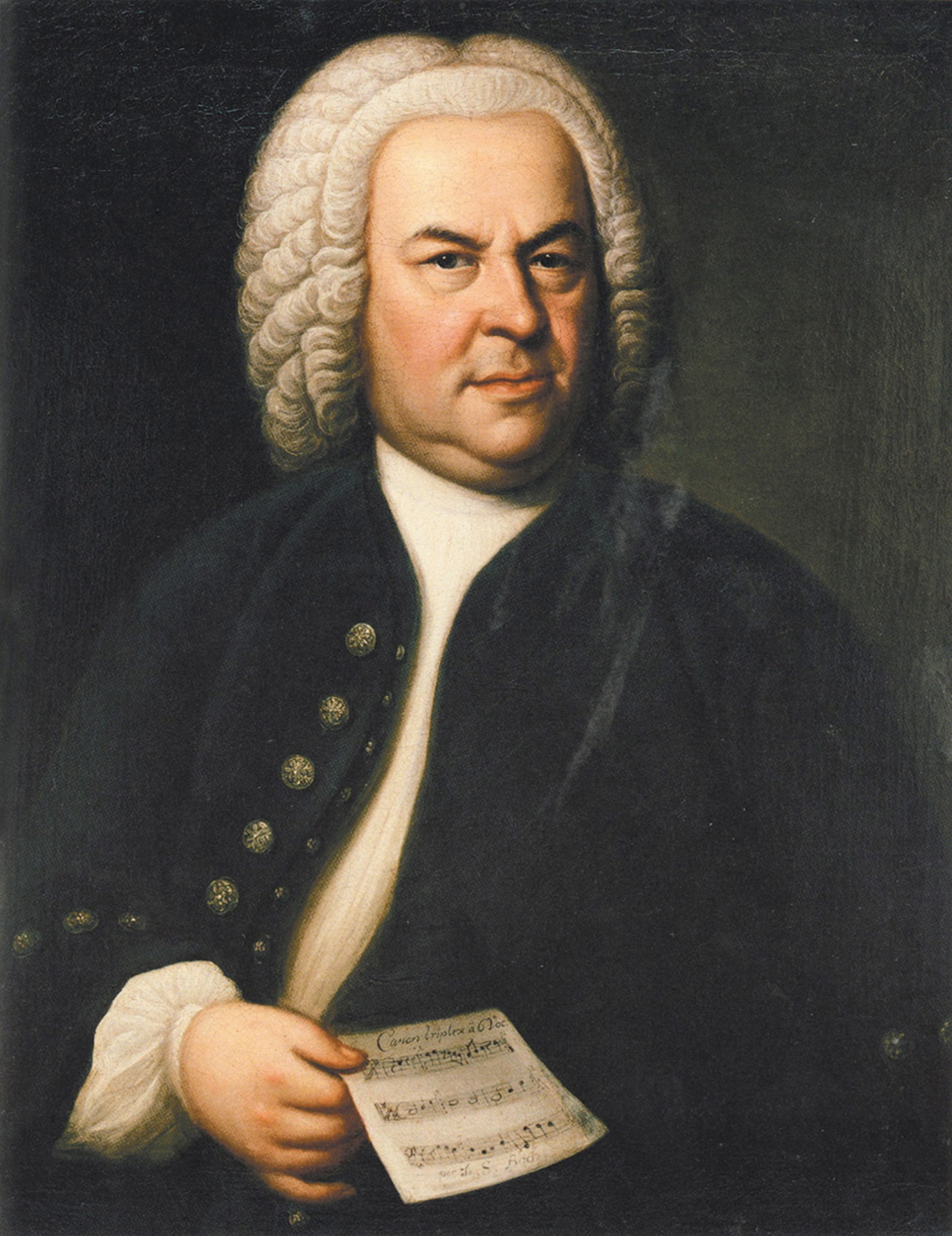
1748 portrait of J.S. Bach

Verjaget, zerstreuet, zerrüttet, ihr Sterne (Dispel them, disperse them, you heavens), BWV 249b, is a lost cantata by Johann Sebastian Bach. It was a birthday cantata composed for Joachim Friedrich von Flemming, governor of Leipzig, and was first performed in Leipzig on 25 August 1726. The cantata text was written by Picander.

Count Flemming is also associated with a later Bach cantata O angenehme Melodei, BWV 210a.

== Possible relationship with the Easter Oratorio ==
The number assigned to Verjaget, zerstreuet, zerrüttet, ihr Sterne in the BWV catalogue indicates that some twentieth-century scholars thought the work was related to the Easter Oratorio, BWV 249, which was first performed in 1725 at Easter. The case for this linkage is based on Bach's habit of recycling music for "one-off" occasions in a process called parody. The Easter Oratorio is an example of parody, being based on a lost work, Entfliehet, verschwindet, entweichet, ihr Sorgen, BWV 249a, premiered in February 1725. BWV 249a, like BWV 249b, was a birthday cantata with a text by Picander.

It has been possible to reconstruct the music of BWV 249a, matching the score of the Easter Oratorio to Picander's secular text. Alexander Grychtolik is the author of the first known reconstruction of Verjaget, zerstreuet, zerrüttet, ihr Sterne that was first performed in June 2021 in Stuttgart.
