= Figuralchor der Gedächtniskirche Stuttgart =

Mixed church- and concert choir based in Stuttgart, Germany

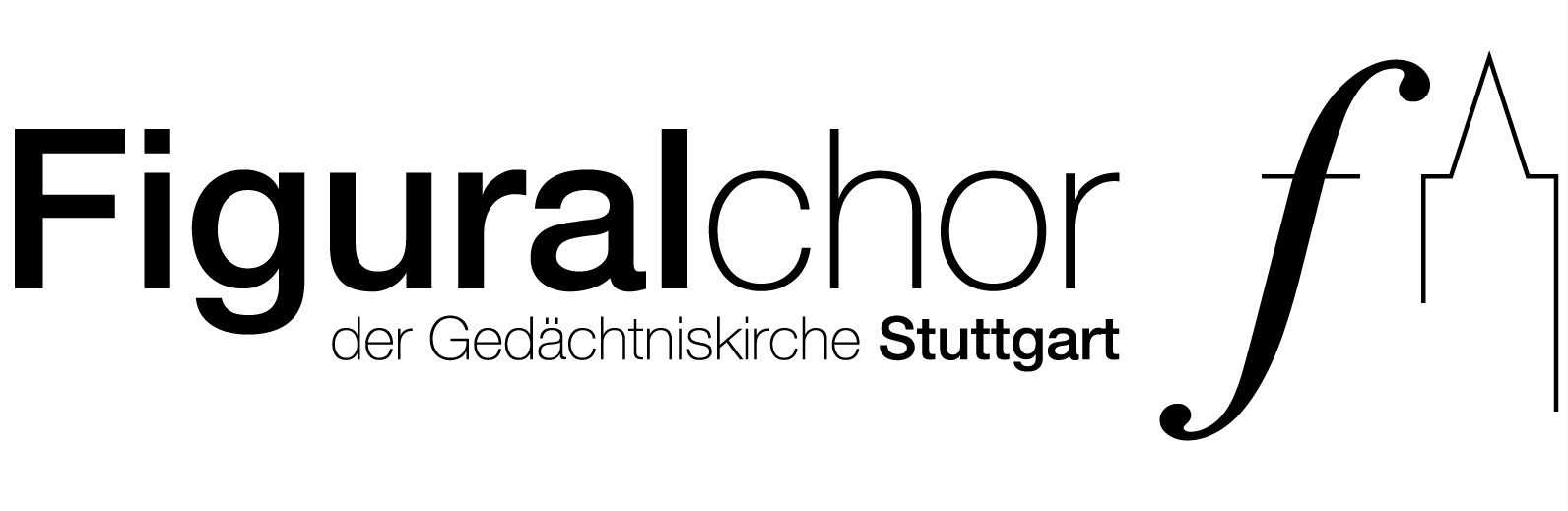

Figuralchor der Gedächtniskirche Stuttgart is a mixed church- and concert choir based in Stuttgart, Germany. It was established in 1957 by Helmuth Rilling. Rilling conducted the choir in several recordings of his project to record the complete choral works by Johann Sebastian Bach. Rilling led the group until the 1970s, when several students took over, first the Americans Henry Gibbons and Gordon Paine. In 1990 the choir went on a concert tour of the United States, conducted by Johannes Moesus. Peter Bachofer was musical director from 1990, Alexander Burda from 2009.

== Recordings ==
- 1962 Heinrich Schütz: Psalm 116 Das ist mir lieb
- 1962 Bach: Ein feste Burg ist unser Gott, BWV 80, Missa in A, BWV 234
- 1963 Handel: Belsazar
- 1963 Bach: Orgelbüchlein, with the chorales for the liturgical year
- 1965 Hodie Christus natus est. Weihnachtliche Motetten, Konzerte und Chorsätze alter Meister. (Motets. concertos and choral music by old masters)
- 1965 Bach: Was mir behagt, ist nur die muntre Jagd, BWV 208
- 1966 Mozart: Coronation Mass, K. 317 Vesperae solennes de confessore, K. 339
- 1966 Bach: Missa in g, BWV 235
- 1966 Bach: Magnificat in E-flat major, BWV 243a, Dieterich Buxtehude: Magnificat
- 1966 Bach: Der Streit zwischen Phoebus und Pan, BWV 202
- 1966 Bach: Zerreißet, zersprenget, zertrümmert die Gruft, BWV 205
- 1966 Bach: Schleicht, spielende Wellen, BWV 206
- 1966 Bach: Preise dein Glücke, gesegnetes Sachsen, BWV 215
- 1966 Anton Bruckner: Mass No. 2
- 1967 Bach: Laßt uns sorgen, laßt uns wachen, BWV 213
- 1967 Bach: Entfliehet, verschwindet, entweichet, ihr Sorgen, BWV 249a
- 2012 Camille Saint-Saëns: Le Déluge, op. 45
