= Lobet den Herrn, alle seine Heerscharen, BWV Anh. 5 =

Bach church cantata

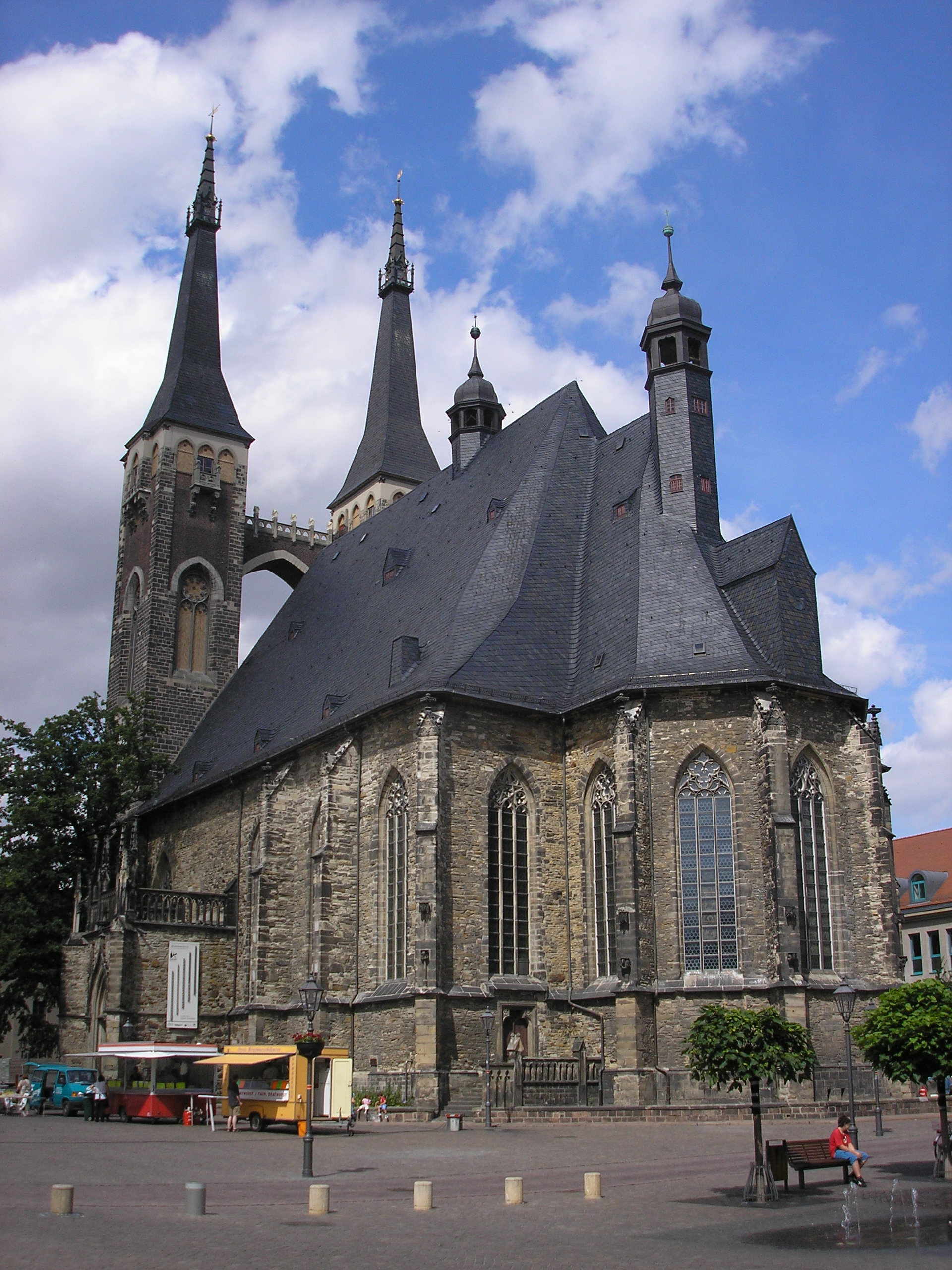
St. Jakob, Köthen, where the cantata Lobet den Herrn, alle seine Heerscharen was performed in December 1718.

Lobet den Herrn, alle seine Heerscharen (Praise ye the Lord, all ye of his great armies), BWV 1147, BWV Anh. 5, is a church cantata text by Christian Friedrich Hunold which was performed, most likely in a setting by Johann Sebastian Bach, for the twenty-fourth birthday of Prince Leopold of Anhalt-Köthen on 10 December 1718. The composition is lost, but its libretto survives in a 1719 print.

== History ==
Johann Sebastian Bach had been a Kapellmeister in Köthen since 1717. During his employment by Prince Leopold there, which lasted until 1723, he composed mostly secular music. The vocal music he composed in Köthen nearly exclusively consisted of secular cantatas on librettos by Christian Friedrich Hunold, who published such texts under the pen name Menantes. Bach's secular cantatas of this period are often congratulatory serenatas for occasions such as New Year and the birthday of the Prince. Around his twenty-fourth birthday Prince Leopold hired a number of visiting musicians, including the singers Prese and Riemschneider, Johann Georg Linike as concertmaster and Johann Gottfried Vogler who was engaged at the Neukirche, the Collegium Musicum and the Oper am Brühl (Leipzig) in the late 1710s.

These musicians, and Bach, participated in the performance of two cantatas on the Prince's birthday, 10 December 1718: Lobet den Herrn, alle seine Heerscharen at St. Jakobs, and, also on a text by Hunold, the secular cantata Der Himmel dacht auf Anhalts Ruhm und Glück, BWV 66.1. The music of these cantatas did not survive: they are known through their librettos which were published by Hunold in 1719. Lobet den Herrn, alle seine Heerscharen is the only certain church cantata of Bach's Köthen period: the court of Anhalt-Köthen was Calvinist, a denomination known for its aversion to elaborate church music. Ihr wallenden Wolken, BWV 1150, an entirely lost New Year's Day cantata in honor of Prince Leopold, is often grouped with Bach's sacred music, but it may as well have been a secular work.

== Text and music ==
In his printed libretto, Hunold indicates Psalms 119:175, "Let my soul live, and it shall praise thee; and let thy judgments help me", as the theme of the cantata. The cantata itself opens with a dictum, Psalms 103:21: "Bless ye the Lord, all ye his hosts; ye ministers of his, that do his pleasure." The cantata has six further movements: three recitatives, each of which is followed by an aria.

No music of the cantata survives, although it is deemed possible that Bach parodied the cantata's first movement in 1723 as the opening chorus for his cantata Lobe den Herrn, meine Seele, BWV 69.1.

Church cantatas by Johann Sebastian Bach by chronology
Preceded by Weimar cantatas	Köthen church cantatas 1717–23	Succeeded by Bach's first cantata cycle
