= Blast Lärmen, ihr Feinde, BWV 205a =

Secular cantata by Johann Sebastian Bach

Blast Lärmen, ihr Feinde (Enemies, blow the alarm), BWV 205.2 (formerly BWV 205a), is a secular cantata composed by Johann Sebastian Bach.

The cantata was intended for the coronation of Augustus III as King of Poland and was first performed on 19 February 1734. The music for the work is lost. The eighth, twelfth and fourteenth movements were newly composed recitatives, while the other movements Bach derived from BWV 205. This has allowed the reconstruction of the Blast Lärmen, ihr Feinde. It was recorded in 2019 in a reconstruction by Alexander Grychtolik and was released with another "lost" work as "Celebration Cantatas BWV 205a & 249a – Entfliehet, ihr Sorgen". The Deutsche Harmonia Mundi recording features Miriam Feuersinger, Elvira Bill, Daniel Johannsen, Stephan MacLeod and Deutsche Hofmusik, conducted by Alexander Grychtolik.

It is counted among the works Bach wrote for celebrations of the Leipzig University, Festmusiken zu Leipziger Universitätsfeiern.
