= Was mir behagt, ist nur die muntre Jagd, BWV 208a =

Cantata by Johann Sebastian Bach

Was mir behagt, ist nur die muntre Jagd (The merry hunt is all that I love), BWV 208.2 and 208.3 both also BWV 208a, are later versions of Johann Sebastian Bach's Hunting Cantata, BWV 208.1, BWV 208. Like the original cantata, which was first performed in Weißenfels in 1713, the two later versions belong to the body of around 50 known secular cantatas by Bach. The BWV 208.2 and 208.3 versions survive as later additions to Bach's autograph score of BWV 208.1:

- BWV 208.2: modifications in the manuscript score, rewriting it as a cantata in honour of Duke Ernst August of Saxe-Weimar. There is no known contemporary performance date for this version.
- BWV 208.3: appended libretto, text version in honour of Frederick Augustus II, Elector of Saxony. This version was performed in Leipzig on 3 August 1742.

The cantata is counted among the works Bach wrote for celebrations of the Leipzig University, Festmusiken zu Leipziger Universitätsfeiern.

The libretto of the original cantata was written by Salomon Franck for the occasion of the 31st birthday of Duke Christian of Saxe-Weissenfels. Apart from text adjustments in Bach's autograph score, such as the replacement of the name "Christian" by "Ernst August", the music of the BWV 208.2 version is deemed identical (or at least near-identical) to that of the first version. The music of the BWV 208.3 version, performed on the occasion of the name day of the Elector, also likely differed little or nothing from previous versions. Other Bach cantatas in honour of the Electors of Saxony are known, for example Ihr Häuser des Himmels, ihr scheinenden Lichter, BWV 193.1, a name day cantata written in 1727 for Frederick Augustus II's father and predecessor.

== Recordings ==
- Leipziger Universitätschor / Pauliner Barockensemble, David Timm. J. S. Bach: Festmusiken zu Leipziger Universitätsfeiern. Querstand, 2009.
