= Vereinigte Zwietracht der wechselnden Saiten, BWV 207 =

Secular cantata by J. S. Bach

Vereinigte Zwietracht der wechselnden Saiten, BWV 207.1
- Secular cantata by J.S. Bach
- Performed: 11 December 1726
- Vocal: SATB choir and solo
- Instrumental: 3 trumpets; timpani; 2 transverse flutes; 2 oboes d'amore; taille; 2 violins; viola; continuo

Vereinigte Zwietracht der wechselnden Saiten (united discord of quivering strings), BWV 207.1 (formerly BWV 207), is a secular cantata composed by Johann Sebastian Bach and first performed on 11 December 1726 in Leipzig.

== History and text ==
Bach wrote several works for celebrations of the Leipzig University, Festmusiken zu Leipziger Universitätsfeiern. He composed this congratulatory cantata to celebrate the appointment of Gottlieb Kortte as professor of Roman Law. The librettist of the work is unknown: it may have been Picander, who had been providing libretti for Bach from at least the previous year when they collaborated on another academic cantata, Zerreißet, zersprenget, zertrümmert die Gruft, BWV 205.

Bach incorporated music from his first Brandenburg Concerto, which was composed years earlier, for the opening chorus. The concerto's third movement is used, with trumpets replacing the concerto's horns, and some of the instrumental music is given to the choir.

Bach led the first performance on 11 December 1726. The cantata became the basis for a similar work Auf, schmetternde Töne der muntern Trompeten, BWV 207.2.

== Structure and scoring ==
Bach structured the cantata in ten movements, beginning with an instrumental march. He wrote it for four solo singers who represent allegorical figures: Glück (Fortune, soprano), Dankbarkeit (Thankfulness, alto), Fleiß (Diligence, tenor), and Ehre (Honour, bass). The cantata also features a four-part choir for the movements framing a sequence of recitatives and arias. Bach orchestrated it festively with three trumpets, timpani, two transverse flutes, two oboes d'amore, taille, two violins, viola, and basso continuo.

1. March
2. Chorus: Vereinigte Zwietracht der wechselnden Saiten
3. Recitative (tenor): Wen treibt ein edler Trieb zu dem, was Ehre heißt
4. Aria (tenor): Zieht euren Fuß nur nicht zurücke
5. Duet recitative (bass and soprano): Dem nur allein
6. Duet aria (bass and soprano) and ritornello: Den soll mein Lorbeer schützend decken
7. Recitative (alto): Es ist kein leeres Wort, kein ohne Grund erregtes Hoffen
8. Aria (alto): Ätzet dieses Angedenken
9. Recitative (SATB): Ihr Schläfrigen, herbei
10. Chorus: Kortte lebe, Kortte blühe

== Recordings ==
- Berliner Solisten, Kammerorchester Berlin, Peter Schreier, Berlin Classics, 1985
- Collegium Vocale Gent, Philippe Herreweghe. J.S. Bach: Tönet, ihr Pauken!. Harmonia Mundi France, 2004.
- Leipziger Universitätschor / Pauliner Barockensemble, David Timm. J. S. Bach: Festmusiken zu Leipziger Universitätsfeiern. Querstand, 2009.
- Bach Collegium Japan, Masaaki Suzuki. J. S. Bach: Secular Cantatas, Vol. 4. BIS, 2017.
- Ex Tempore Choir, Florian Heyerick / Musica Antiqua Köln, Reinhard Goebel BWV 36c, 201, 206, 207, Quodlibet BWV 524. Archiv Produktion 457 348-2, 1996 & 1997.

== Related music ==
Different attempt have been made to make the closing chorus suitable to more general occasions, by adaptations with a different text. In German, Carus published in 2008 a version "Lob und Preis dem Herrn / Festlicher Schlussgesang zum Gottesdienst (Lauds and praise to the Lord / Festive closing chorus for a service), edited by Karl Kremer and using Bach's scoring. A version "Jauchzet, lobet", with a middle section referring to Christmas or Easter/Pentecost, was adapted for choir and organ.
