= O holder Tag, erwünschte Zeit, BWV 210 =

Secular cantata by Johann Sebastian Bach

O holder Tag, erwünschte Zeit
- Secular cantata by J. S. Bach
- Catalogue: BWV 210.2; BWV 210
- Related: based on BWV 210a
- Occasion: Wedding
- Movements: 10
- Vocal: solo soprano
- Instrumental: flauto traverso; oboe d'amore; 2 violins; viola; continuo

O holder Tag, erwünschte Zeit (O lovely day, o hoped-for time), BWV 210.2, BWV 210, is a secular cantata by Johann Sebastian Bach. He wrote the solo cantata for soprano in Leipzig for a wedding and first performed it between 1738 and 1746. Bach used material from a "Huldigungskantate" (homage cantata), O angenehme Melodei, first performed in January 1729.

== History and words ==
Bach wrote the cantata for a wedding; scholars suggest different possible events. Werner Neumann mentions the wedding of Anna Regina Bose and Friedrich Heinrich Graf (3 April 1742), and of Christina Sibylla Bose and Johann Zacharias Richter (6 February 1744); Herrmann von Hase suggests the wedding of Johanna Catharina Amalie Schatz and Friedrich Gottlob Zoller (11 August 1746). According to Michael Maul, the cantata celebrated the wedding of the Prussian Court Counsellor Georg E. Stahl (1741). The cantata text of an unknown poet suggests an influential man who esteemed music. The parts for soprano and continuo are written in exquisite calligraphy, probably as a gift for the couple. The words center on the relationship between music and marital love, ending in praise of the bridegroom as a supporter of music.

The cantata may have been performed at least twice.

== Scoring and structure ==
Bach titled the work Cantata a Voce sola. The cantata is scored for soprano, flauto traverso, oboe d'amore, two violins, viola, violone, and harpsichord continuo.

1. Recitative: O holder Tag, erwünschte Zeit
2. Aria: Spielet, ihr beseelten Lieder (A major)
3. Recitative: Doch, haltet ein, ihr muntern Saiten
4. Aria: Ruhet hie, matte Töne (E major)
5. Recitative: So glaubt man denn, dass die Musik verführe
6. Aria: Schweigt, ihr Flöten, schweigt, ihr Töne (B minor)
7. Recitative: Was Luft? was Grab?
8. Aria: Großer Gönner, dein Vergnügen
9. Recitative: Hochteurer Mann, so fahre ferner fort (A major)
10. Aria: Seid beglückt (A major)

== Music ==
Bach used material from a "Huldigungskantate" (homage cantata), O angenehme Melodei, BWV 210.1, for all the arias, the first recitative and part of the last recitative. Alexander Ferdinand Grychtolik edited a reconstruction of the lost homage cantata based on the wedding cantata, published by Edition Güntersberg. Bach's music is demanding, especially for the soprano and the flutist. The movements show different instrumentation, to ensure variety in spite of only one singing voice. The arias show a "decrescendo" (Alfred Dürr), a diminishing of the number of instruments, towards the central Schweigt, ihr Flöten, schweigt, ihr Töne (Silence, you flutes, silence, you tones), in which the voice corresponds with the flute as in a duet. The following arias are scored "crescendo" until the final festive movement. While all other recitatives are secco, the last one is accompanied by figuration in the flute and the oboe d'amore, long chords in the strings.

== Selected recordings ==
- J. S. Bach: Cantata No. 210, Hermann Scherchen, Orchestra of the Vienna State Opera, Magda László, Westminster 1950
- J. S. Bach: Cantata BWV 210, Aria for Soprano, Helmut Winschermann, Deutsche Bachsolisten, Ursula Buckel, Cantate 1963
- Bach made in Germany Vol. VII – Secular Cantatas III, Peter Schreier, Kammerorchester Berlin, Lucia Popp, Eterna 1981
- Bach: Wedding Cantatas, Christopher Hogwood, The Academy of Ancient Music, Emma Kirkby, Decca 1996
- J. S. Bach: Complete Cantatas Vol. 5, Ton Koopman, Amsterdam Baroque Orchestra, Lisa Larsson, Antoine Marchand 1996
- Die Bach Kantate Vol. 66, Helmuth Rilling, Sibylla Rubens, Hänssler 1998
- J. S. Bach: Wedding Cantatas, Reinhard Goebel, Musica Antiqua Köln, Christine Schäfer, Deutsche Grammophon 1999
- J. S. Bach: Cantatas Vol. 30, Masaaki Suzuki, Bach Collegium Japan, Carolyn Sampson, BIS 2003
