= Amore traditore, BWV 203 =

Secular cantata composed by Johann Sebastian Bach

Amore traditore (Treacherous love), BWV 203, (Note: "BWV" is Bach-Werke-Verzeichnis, a thematic catalogue of Bach's works.) is a secular cantata composed by Johann Sebastian Bach in Köthen between 1718 and 1719, while he was in the service of the court of Leopold, Prince of Anhalt-Köthen. Bach wrote the unusual work on an Italian libretto for a bass soloist and harpsichord.

== Background ==
After an extended period at the court of Weimar, Bach was Kapellmeister at the court of Leopold, Prince of Anhalt-Köthen between 1717 and 1723, directing a qualified musical ensemble. As the court was Reformed, he had no obligations to compose church music, but focused on instrumental works. Although he had no choir at his disposition, he had several excellent singers who sometimes stayed for a short period. He later wrote about this period:

There I had a gracious Prince, who both loved and knew music, and in his service I intended to spend the rest of my life.

== History and text ==
Bach composed this cantata in Köthen in 1718 or 1719 for an unknown occasion. Its librettist and first performance are also unknown. Unusually for Bach, the text is Italian; only one other cantata (BWV 209) has Italian text. The text is very similar to the text of a cantata by Nicola Fago.

The composition of Amore traditore may have been prompted by the visit of Johann Gottfried Riemschneider, a famous bass, at the court in Köthen in 1718-19. Bach wrote the work to entertain, and to showcase two musicians, the singer and a virtuoso harpsichordist.

== Scoring and structure ==
The cantata is based on the Italian solo cantata tradition. It is structured in three movements, alternating arias and a connecting recitative, and scored for a solo bass and keyboard (and possibly cello or viola da gamba).

1. Aria: Amore traditore
2. Recitative: Voglio provar
3. Aria: Chi in amore ha nemica la sorte

== Music ==
The first aria includes a flowing bass line and strong ritornello theme. The movement is in da capo form and features long melismas and a very high vocal range. The secco recitative is short but not harmonically cohesive. The final movement is also a da capo aria, with three lines of counterpoint and a complex keyboard part.

== Recordings ==
- Jacques Villisech, Gustav Leonhardt. J. S. Bach: Cantatas BWV 203 & BWV 209. Telefunken, 1964.
- Amsterdam Baroque Orchestra & Choir, Ton Koopman Bach: Complete Cantatas, Vol. 2. Erato, 1995
- Klaus Mertens, Ton Koopman. Ton Koopman Plays Bach. Naxos, 2000.
- Dominik Wörner, il Gardellino. Solo Cantatas for Bass. Passacaille 2013.
- Bach Collegium Japan, Masaaki Suzuki, Dominik Wörner. Bach Secular cantatas Vol. 7. BIS SACD.
