= Vergnügte Pleißenstadt, BWV 216 =

Secular cantata by Johann Sebastian Bach

Vergnügte Pleißenstadt (Contented Pleisse-town), BWV 216.1 (formerly BWV 216), is a secular cantata composed by Johann Sebastian Bach, which survives in an incomplete state.

== History and text ==
Bach composed this cantata for the wedding of Johann Heinrich Wolff and Susanna Regina Hempel. Susanna was the daughter of a customs official, and came from Zittau; her husband came from Leipzig, where the work was first performed on 5 February 1728. The text was written by Picander, who published it in his collection Ernst-Schertzhaffte und Satyrische Gedichte. Picander refers to the bride and groom by the rivers of their respective cities (the "Pleißenstadt" of the title is Leipzig, the city on the river Pleiße).

There was a related work Erwählte Pleißenstadt: Apollo et Mercurius, BWV 216.2, the music of which is lost. This was written for Leipzig Town Council, and the text does not relate to Zittau.

== Scoring and structure ==
The surviving music consists of parts for soprano and alto voices, representing the characters of Neiße and Pleiße respectively. The instrumental forces are unknown, but for two numbers Bach drew on music he had composed for earlier cantatas, which may suggest a range of instrumental colour was called for. One parody source is a duet for alto and tenor from Zerreißet, zersprenget, zertrümmert die Gruft, BWV 205, a festively scored work premiered in 1725. The parody source of movement 3 was Ich bin in mir vergnügt, BWV 204, scored for soprano soloist, flauto traverso, two oboes, two violins, viola, and basso continuo and also premiered in the 1720s.

It includes seven movements:

1. Duet aria: Vergnügte Pleißenstadt
2. Duet recitative: So angenehm auch mein Revier
3. Aria (soprano): Angenehme Hempelin
4. Recitative (alto): Erspare den Verdruss
5. Aria (alto): Mit Lachen und Scherzen
6. Duet recitative: Wie lieblich wird sie nun
7. Duet aria: Heil und Segen

== Recording ==
- Bach Concertino Osaka, Joshua Rifkin. J.S. Bach: Hochzeitkantaten. Mainich Classics, 2005.
