= Durchlauchtster Leopold, BWV 173a =

Secular cantata by Johann Sebastian Bach

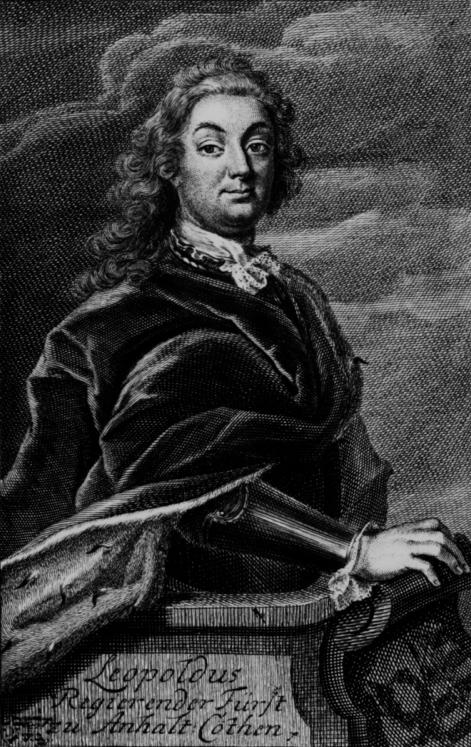
Leopold von Anhalt-Köthen

Durchlauchtster Leopold (Most illustrious Leopold), BWV 173.1 (formerly BWV 173a), is a secular cantata by Johann Sebastian Bach. Bach composed the cantata for performance in Köthen to celebrate the birthday of Leopold von Anhalt-Köthen. The cantata is one of a series of congratulatory works which Bach wrote for this employer. Some of them are lost, while others such as Der Himmel dacht auf Anhalts Ruhm und Glück, BWV 66.1 can be reconstructed because Bach reused the music later. Durchlauchtster Leopold is unusual in surviving in a complete state.

== History and words ==
Bach composed the cantata as a congratulatory cantata, also termed serenata, for the 28th birthday of his employer, Leopold von Anhalt-Köthen, on 10 December 1722. The holograph manuscript survives in Berlin, but cannot be dated exactly. The libretto shows a date of "before 22 December 1722".

Bach may have begun the work when he was appointed Prince Leopold's Kapellmeister in 1717, according to Alfred Dürr. If this hypothesis is correct, Bach would potentially have had a few months to compose a work for the prince's birthday, but even relatively simple music could have required some haste given the circumstances in which he left his job in Weimar, being imprisoned by his employer for not following correct resignation procedures. Bach was released on 2 December and was still in the process of moving to Köthen on 10 December 1717.

The unknown poet wrote eight movements. Only two of them, 1 and 5, are recitatives, but even these are regular in meter and rhyme and may have been intended for arias. The first recitative even shows a da capo of the first line, addressing "Durchlauchtster Leopold", translated to "Most illustrious Leopold" or, more literally, "Most Serene Leopold". The two vocal parts may have been allegorical figures, as for example in the cantata for New Year's Day Die Zeit, die Tag und Jahre macht, BWV 134a, but are not marked in the text.

In 1724 Bach used six of the eight movements to form his cantata Erhöhtes Fleisch und Blut, BWV 173.2, for Pentecost Monday, and in 1725 he took movement 7 for his cantata for Pentecost Tuesday Er rufet seinen Schafen mit Namen, BWV 175.

=== Publication ===
The cantata was published in 1887 in the first complete edition of the composer's works, the Bach-Gesellschaft-Ausgabe.

== Scoring and structure ==
The cantata is scored for two vocal soloists (soprano and bass), two flauto traverso, bassoon, two violins, viola and basso continuo including violone and harpsichord. The last movement is marked chorus, but was probably performed by the two soloists.

1. Recitative (soprano): Durchlauchtster Leopold
2. Aria (soprano): Güldner Sonnen frohe Stunden
3. Aria (bass): Leopolds Vortrefflichkeiten
4. Aria (soprano, bass): Unter seinem Purpursaum
5. Recitative (soprano, bass): Durchlauchtigster, den Anhalt Vater nennt
6. Aria (soprano): So schau dies holden Tages Licht
7. Aria (bass): Dein Name gleich der Sonnen geh
8. Chorus (soprano, bass): Nimm auch, großer Fürst, uns auf

== Music ==
Bach composed varied music for the rather monotonous text. Movement 1 is accompanied by the strings and leads to a virtuoso coloratura on the da capo of the first line, addressing Leopold. Movement 2 is reminiscent of a dance, gently scored for flutes and strings, in triplets. Movement 3 is a short praise movement, marked vivace. Movement 4 is a duet, marked "Al tempo di minuetto", which handles three stanzas in ever richer variations: the first stanza is for one voice and strings in G major, the second in the higher key of D major with additional flutes, the final one for both voices in A major in a denser musical texture. The structure of this duet is unique in Bach's cantatas, the variations in rising keys, and the increase in instruments and musical texture all adding up to illustrate the exaltation of the addressee. Movement 5 leads to an arioso. Movement 6 is a bourrée, dominated by a flute which comes and goes. Movement 7 is in great contrast set for only low voice and instruments, bassoon and cello in unison to a continuo played by violone and harpsichord. The final dance-like movement shows elements of a polonaise. Its two parts begin both with an instrumental concerto which is then repeated with embedded voices.

== Recordings ==
- Bach Collegium Japan, Masaaki Suzuki. BIS 2012.
- Amsterdam Baroque Orchestra & Choir, Ton Koopman. J.S. Bach: Complete Cantatas Vol. 9. Antoine Marchand 1998.
- Choir & Orchestra of the Age of Enlightenment, Gustav Leonhardt. J.S. Bach: Secular Cantatas BWV 173a & 201. Philips 1995.
- Les Violons du Roy, Bernard Labadie. J.S. Bach: Secular Cantatas. Dorian Recordings 1994.
- Thomanerchor / Gewandhausorchester, Hans-Joachim Rotzsch. Bach Made in Germany Vol. 4 – Cantatas V. Eterna 1974.
