= Johann Heinrich Winckler =

German physicist & philosopher (1703–1770)

Johann Heinrich Winkler or Winckler (12 March 1703 – 18 May 1770) was a German physicist and philosopher.

== Biography ==
=== Early life ===
Winckler was born in Wingendorf, a village in Silesia. He was educated at Leipzig University. One of his teachers was Andreas Rüdiger, an opponent of Christian Wolff. Winckler read Wolff's works and defended him against Rudiger during his lessons.

=== Career ===
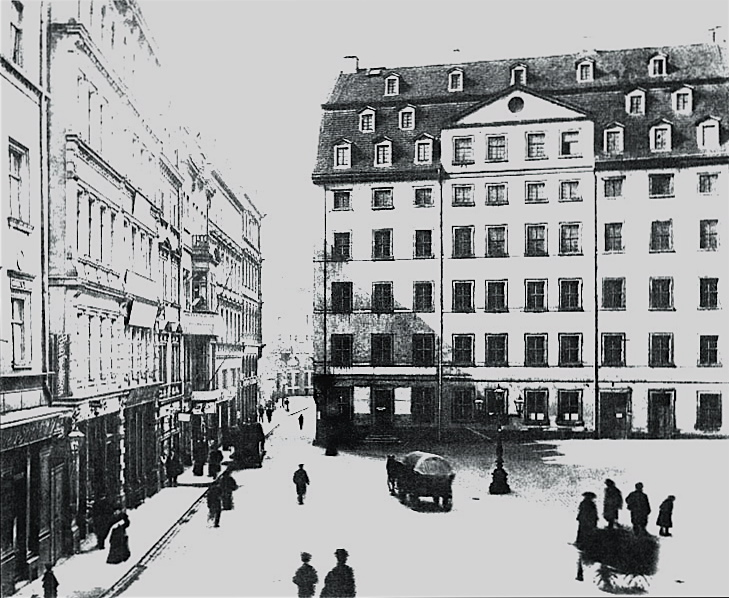
St Thomas School

In 1731, he was appointed a teacher (collega quartus) at St. Thomas School in Leipzig. The building was enlarged the same year and he wrote the libretto of Froher Tag, verlangte Stunde, a cantata to mark the completion of the project. It was set to music by his colleague Johann Sebastian Bach and performed in the summer of 1732.

Winckler authored a textbook of philosophy first published in 1735 and a second edition in 1742. In 1739, he became professor of philosophy at Leipzig university and professor of Latin and Greek in 1742. In 1750, he became professor of physics. He was elected president of the university eight times.

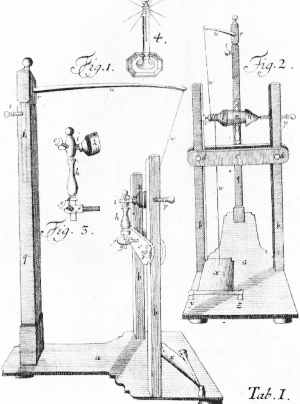
Winckler's machine for generating electricity from a beer-glass

Winckler is best known for his electrical experimentation research. In 1744, Winckler authored, Gedanken von den Eigenschaften, Wirkungen und Ursachen der Electricität: nebst einer Beschreibung zwo neuer electrischen Machinen (Thoughts on the Properties, Effects, and Causes of Electricity: Together with a Description of Two New Electrical Machines, 1744).

== Winckler and the Royal Society ==
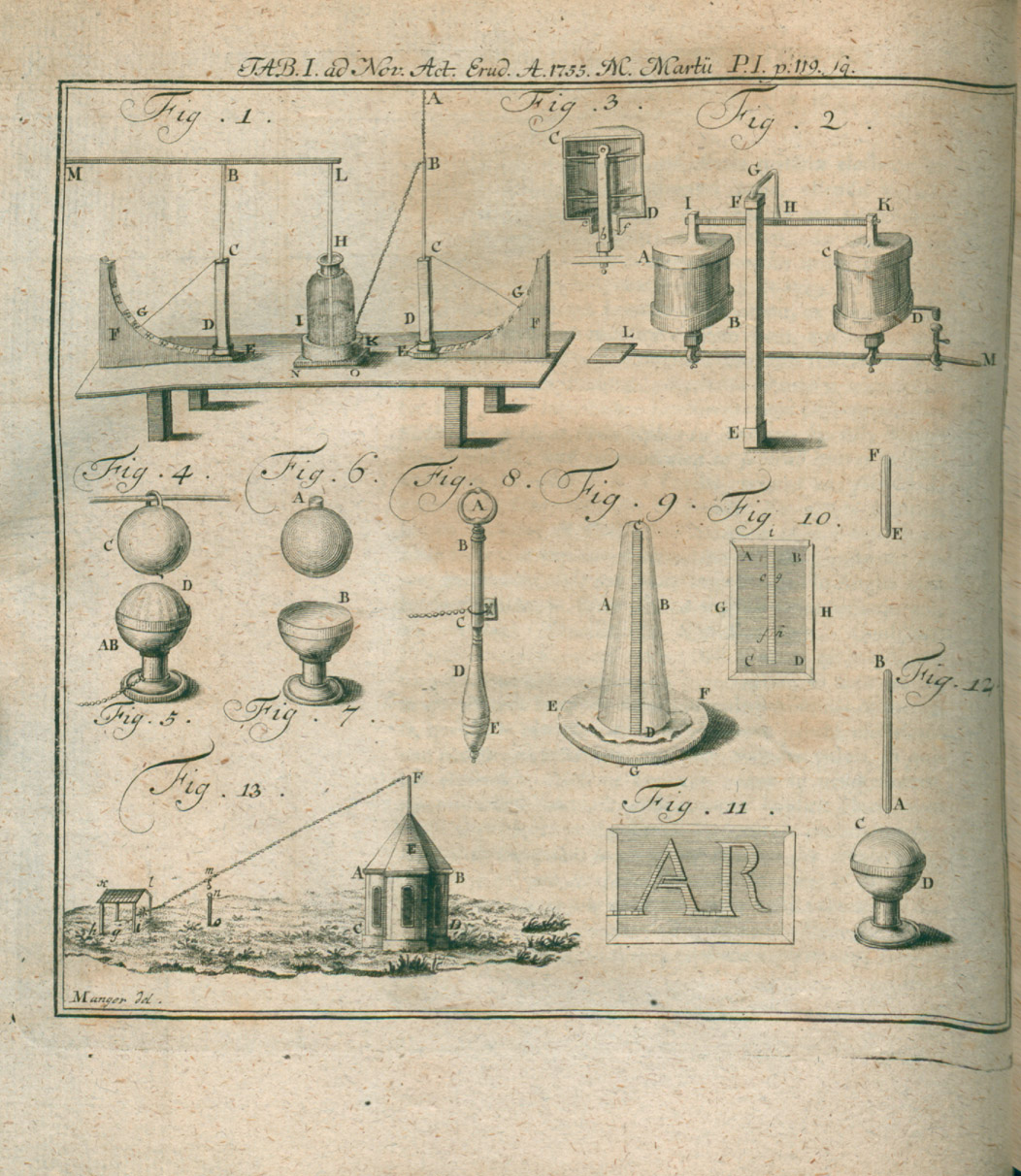
Illustration about De avertendi fulminis artificio published in Acta Eruditorum, 1755

Winckler was elected to the Royal Society in 1747. The Royal Society, which spelled his name Winkler, published information about his electrical experiments in their Philosophical Transactions.

== Animal rights ==
Winckler authored a series of essays between 1741–1743 on the existence of animal souls. He took an anti-Cartesian position and was convinced that animals have intelligence and possess sensitive souls. Winckler's textbook Institutiones Philosophiae Universae, published in 1762, drew ethical conclusions from his views on animal souls. Winckler argued that since animals have sensitive souls, there is no valid reason why it should be permissible to torment them. Winckler stated that human beings should cause as little pain as possible to animals when using them or killing them for food.

Winckler's writings on animal souls similar to Johann Friedrich Ludwig Volckmann, John Hildrop, Richard Dean and Laurids Smith have been described as narrowing the gap between animals and human beings and starting "the idea of animal protection on the basis of animal psychology."

== Selected publications ==
- Institutiones Philosophiae Universae (1742, 1762)
- Untersuchung von dem Seyn und Wesen der Seelen der Thiere (1742–1745).
- Gedanken von den Eigenschaften, Wirkungen und Ursachen der Electricität: nebst einer Beschreibung zwo neuer electrischen Machinen (1744)
