= Entfernet euch, ihr heitern Sterne, BWV Anh. 9 =

Cantata by Johann Sebastian Bach

Entfernet euch, ihr heitern Sterne
- Secular cantata by J. S. Bach
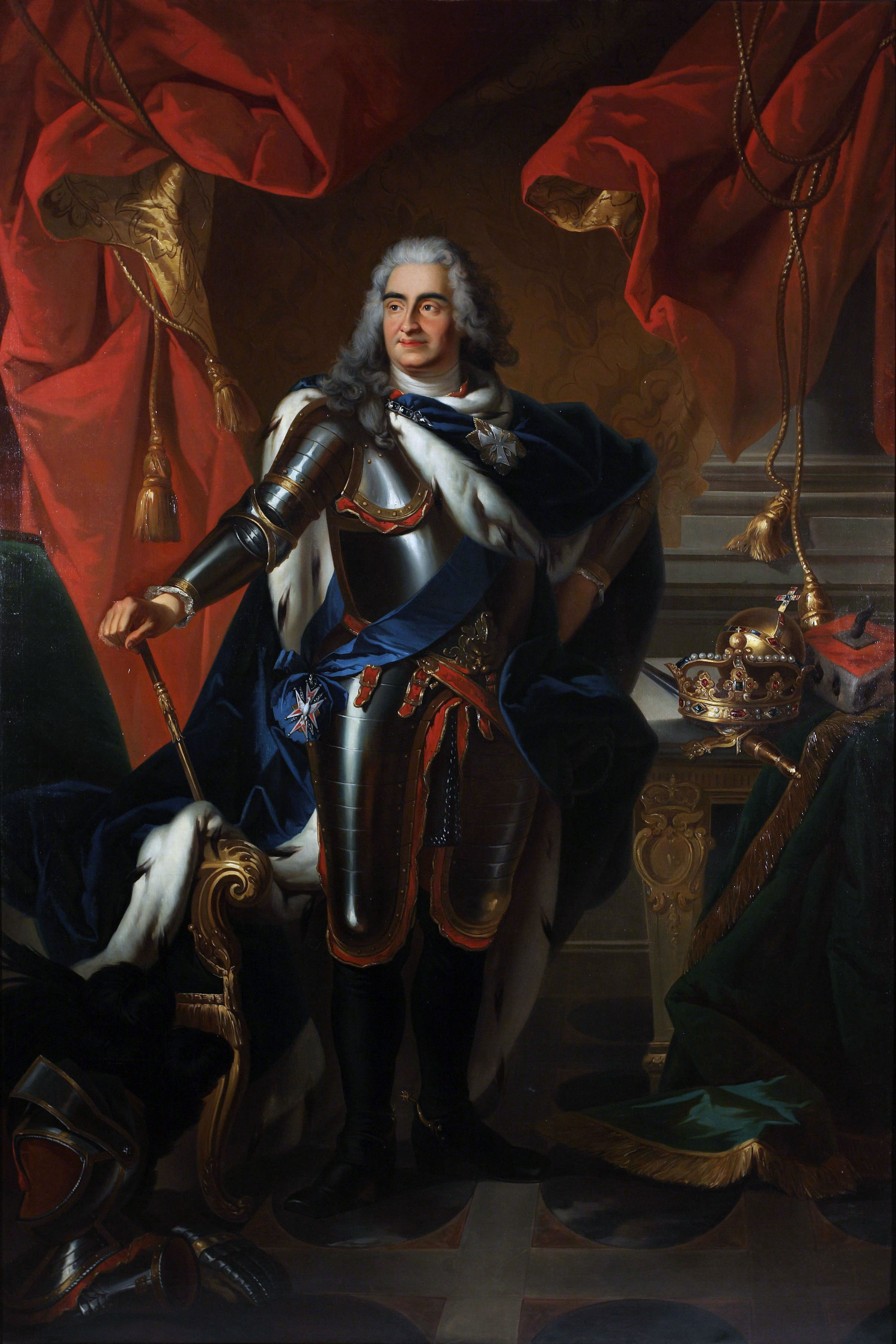
- Augustus II the Strong, known as Frederick Augustus I in Saxony, for whom the cantata was created
- English: Disperse yourselves, ye stars, serenely!
- Catalogue: BWV 1156 (BWV Anh. 9)
- Occasion: birthday of the sovereign
- Text: by Christian Friedrich Haupt

Premiere
- Date: 12 May 1727
- Location: Leipzig, Markt
- Conductor: J. S. Bach

Entfernet euch, ihr heitern Sterne (Disperse yourselves, ye stars, serenely!), BWV 1156 (formerly BWV Anh. 9), is a birthday cantata by Johann Sebastian Bach. He composed it in Leipzig to celebrate the 57th birthday of the Elector of Saxony, King Augustus II the Strong, and it was performed for him on his birthday, 12 May 1727, on the Markt square of Leipzig, by students of the University of Leipzig, with Bach directing. The king was also presented with the work's libretto, written by Christian Friedrich Haupt.

The music to this secular birthday cantata by Bach is lost. It has been speculated from the surviving libretto, however, that several movements from the Mass in B minor are derived from it. A reconstruction has been created using the music of the Mass.

The cantata is counted among Bach's works for celebrations of the Leipzig University, Festmusiken zu Leipziger Universitätsfeiern.

== Recordings ==
The reconstruction by Dr. Klaus Höfner has been recorded.
