= O angenehme Melodei, BWV 210a =

Secular cantata by Johann Sebastian Bach

O angenehme Melodei
- Secular cantata by J. S. Bach
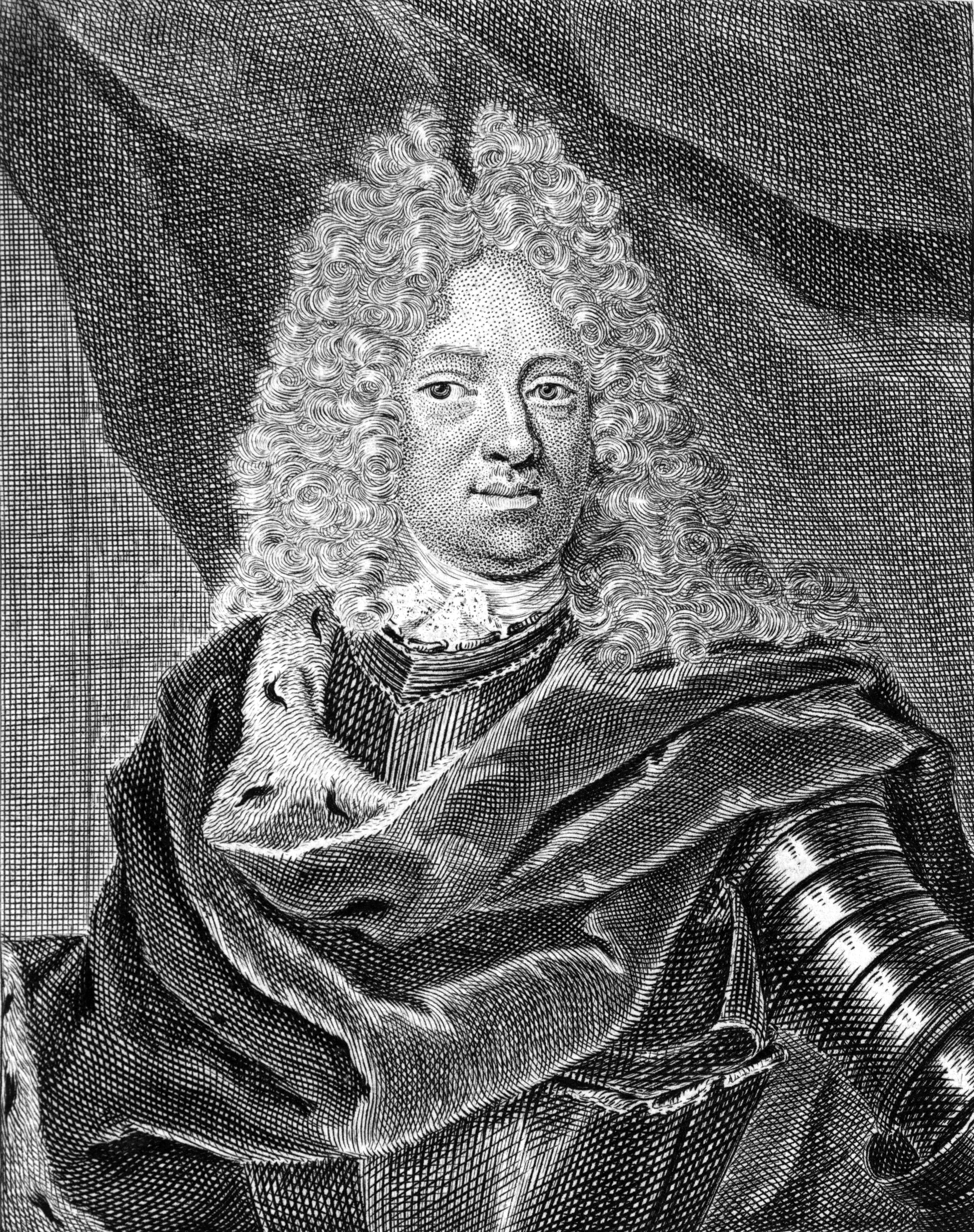
- Christian, Duke of Saxe-Weissenfels, dedicatee of the first performance of the cantata
- Catalogue: BWV 210.1; BWV 210a
- Related: basis for BWV 210
- Occasion: Visit of Christian, Duke of Saxe-Weissenfels, to Leipzig
- Text: by Christian Friedrich Hunold
- Performed: 12 January 1729: Leipzig
- Movements: 8
- Vocal: solo soprano
- Instrumental: flauto traverso; oboe d'amore; 2 violins; viola; continuo

O angenehme Melodei (O pleasing melody), BWV 210.1 (formerly BWV 210a), is a secular cantata by Johann Sebastian Bach for a solo soprano. Bach wrote it in Leipzig as a "Huldigungskantate" (homage cantata) for Christian, Duke of Saxe-Weissenfels. First performed on 12 January 1729, the cantata became part of his repertory of congratulatory and homage cantatas, dedicated at least twice to different people and occasions. Bach used it as the basis for his wedding cantata O holder Tag, erwünschte Zeit. Most of the music of O angenehme Melodei was lost, but can be reconstructed from the later work, which survived completely.

== History and words ==
Bach first performed O angenehme Melodei cantata in 1729 and adapted it for two other occasions. The first version, performed on 12 January 1729, paid homage to Christian, Duke of Saxe-Weissenfels on the occasion of his visit to Leipzig. The dates of the later performances are not known, but the dedications were to Joachim Friedrich Count Flemming, the governor of Leipzig (words for that occasion given below), and, thirdly, to the Gönner von Wissenschaft und Kunst (Patron of Science and Art). This version is also called the Sponsorenkantate (the sponsors' cantata).

Only the soprano part and a separate printed textbook of the earliest version survived into the twentieth century. The soprano part was lost in World War II. Bach used the five arias, the first recitative and the beginning of the last recitative later in his wedding cantata O holder Tag, erwünschte Zeit, therefore the music can be reconstructed. Alexander Ferdinand Grychtolik edited a reconstruction, published by Edition Güntersberg. He chose the third text version as the most general one.

== Scoring, structure and music ==
The cantata in ten movements is probably scored as the surviving O holder Tag, erwünschte Zeit, for soprano, flauto traverso, oboe d'amore, two violins, viola, and basso continuo with violone and harpsichord.

1. Recitative: O angenehme Melodei
2. Aria: Spielet, ihr beseelten Lieder
3. Recitative: Ihr Sorgen, flieht
4. Aria: Ruhet hie, matte Töne
5. Recitative: Wiewohl, beliebte Musica
6. Aria: Schweigt, ihr Flöten, schweigt, ihr Töne
7. Recitative: Doch fasse dich, dein Glanz
8. Aria: Großer Flemming, alles Wissen
9. Recitative: Erleuchtet Haupt, so bleibe fernerweit
10. Aria: Sei vergnügt, großer Flemming

Richard D. P. Jones notes in his book The Creative Development of Johann Sebastian Bach that the text deals with the power of music, inspiring Bach to music of "quite exceptional quality".
