= Ihr Häuser des Himmels, ihr scheinenden Lichter, BWV 193a =

Secular cantata by Johann Sebastian Bach

Ihr Häuser des Himmels, ihr scheinenden Lichter (Ye houses of heaven, ye radiant lights), BWV 193.1 (formerly BWV 193a), is a secular cantata by Johann Sebastian Bach first performed on 3 August 1727. The music is lost, but it can be partially reconstructed as several movements (including the opening chorus) are known to have shared music with Ihr Tore zu Zion, BWV 193.2, a church cantata which was premiered around three weeks after Ihr Häuser des Himmels, ihr scheinenden Lichter.

== History and text ==
This cantata was composed for the name day of Frederick August I, Elector of Saxony. The text is by Picander who published it in the second part of his collection Picanders Ernst-Schertzhaffte und Satyrische Gedichte (Leipzig 1729). However, there has been speculation that Picander based his text on the work of Christian Friedrich Hunold, an earlier librettist of Bach. The reason for this suggestion is a similarity to a series of congratulatory cantatas Bach composed at Köthen.

The opening chorus is about a council of the gods. It was the custom for congratulatory works such as this to feature allegorical characters; in this case they are: Providentia (Providence), Fama (Fame), Salus (Well-being) and Pietas (Piety).

The title page bears the dedication:

Bey der / Hohen Nahmens-Feyer / Ihro / Koenigl. Maj. in Pohlen / und Churfl. Durchl. zu Sachsen etc. / bezeigte / In einer geringen MUSIC / Seinen allerunterthaenligsten Glueckwunsch / Christian Friedrich Henrici / Leipzig den 3. Aug. 1727

In English it may be rendered as:

At the / high feast of the name / of your Serene Highness / King of Poland / and Elector in Saxony / showed / in a little MUSIC / his most subordinate congratulation / Christian Friedrich Henrici / Leipzig the 3rd of Aug. 1727.

The cantata is counted among the works for celebrations of the Leipzig University, Festmusiken zu Leipziger Universitätsfeiern.

== Structure ==
The work has eleven movements:

1. Chorus: Ihr Haeuser des Himmels, ihr scheinenden Lichter
2. Recitative (Providentia): Preißwuerdigster August
3. Aria (Providentia): Nenne deinen August: Gott!
4. Recitative (Fama): O! schoener Tag, o! schoene Blicke
5. Aria (Fama, Providentia): {Ich will/Du solt} ruehmen, {ich will/du solt} sagen
6. Recitative (Providentia, Fama, Salus): So AUGUSTUS nicht an Ruhm und Thatten Seines gleichen
7. Aria (Salus): Herr! so gross als Dein Erhoehen
8. Recitative (Pietas): Wie bin ich doch ergoetzt
9. Aria (Pietas): Sachsen, komm zum Opffer-Heerd
10. Recitative (Pietas): Doch worzu wollen wir viel Tempel bauen?
11. Aria (Pietas, chorus): Himmel, erhoere das bethende Land

There has been speculation that the fifth movement, a duet (not found in Cantata BWV 193) between Providentia and Fama, may have influenced the duet "Domine Deus", the central movement of the Gloria in Bach's Mass in B Minor.

== Sources ==
- Cantata BWV 193a Ihr Häuser des Himmels, ihr scheinenden Lichter history, scoring, sources for text and music, translations to various languages, discography, discussion, Bach Cantatas Website
- Ihr Häuser des Himmels, ihr scheinenden Lichter history, scoring, Bach website (in German)
