= Erwählte Pleißenstadt, BWV 216a =

Secular cantata by Johann Sebastian Bach

Erwählte Pleißenstadt ("O chosen Leipzig", literally: "Chosen city on the [river] Pleiße"), BWV 216.2 (formerly BWV 216a), is a secular cantata composed by Johann Sebastian Bach.

It was a homage cantata for the Leipzig town council and was first performed in 1728 or later. The text, which is possibly by Picander, survives. The music is lost, but there is scope for its partial reconstruction. The work is known to have been a parody of Vergnügte Pleißenstadt, BWV 216.1, a wedding cantata with text by Picander which was performed in 1728. The wedding cantata survives in fragmentary form.

The harpsichordist Alexander Grychtolik reconstructed Erwählte Pleißenstadt from the draft libretto and fragments of notation rediscovered in 2003 among the posthumous papers of a Japanese pianist. A recording was issued on Deutsche Harmonia Mundi in 2017.
