= Non sa che sia dolore, BWV 209 =

Secular cantata by Johann Sebastian Bach

Non sa che sia dolore (He knows not what sorrow is), BWV 209, (Note: "BWV" is Bach-Werke-Verzeichnis, a thematic catalogue of Bach's works.) is a secular cantata composed by Johann Sebastian Bach and possibly first performed in Leipzig in 1747. With Amore Traditore, it is one of the composer's only two settings of a text in Italian.

== History and text ==
Internal evidence suggests that the text by an unknown librettist was not written before 1729. The text also contains clues as to the occasion for which it was written. It refers to Ansbach, Bavaria, and, somewhat confusingly given Bavaria's location, a sea voyage. Mincham draws attention to an interest in Ansbach in Italian music, and suggests that Bach would have known that the city was the home of Giuseppe Torelli at the end of the 17th century. However, while the identity of the person undertaking the voyage is not clear, it appears to be a German rather than an Italian. It has been suggested that Bach composed this cantata as a farewell for someone leaving Leipzig's academic community such as Johann Matthias Gesner (1691-1761) or Lorenz Albrecht Beck (1723-1768), both men having connections with Ansbach.

Bach's autograph score does not survive. The cantata was first published in 1881 in the Bach-Gesellschaft-Ausgabe, the first complete edition of the composer's works.

== Scoring and structure ==
The piece is scored for solo soprano voice, flauto traverso, two violins, viola, and basso continuo.

The cantata has five movements:

1. Sinfonia
2. Recitative: Non sa che sia dolore
3. Aria: Parti pur e con dolore
4. Recitative: Tuo saver al tempo e l'età contrasta
5. Aria: Ricetti gramezza e pavento

== Music ==
Bach may have derived the opening sinfonia in B minor from a previous concerto. It includes a prominent "baroque 'weeping' figure". The first recitative uses tonality to underline the meaning of the "quasi-philosophical" text. The following da capo aria is in E minor and features a flute obbligato. The second recitative is short and secco, contrasting sharply with the final "ebulliently major" da capo aria.

== Recordings ==
- Agnes Giebel (soprano), Das Leonhardt-Consort Gustav Leonhardt. J. S. Bach: Cantatas BWV 203 & BWV 209. Telefunken, 1964.
- Elly Ameling (soprano), William Bennett (flute), Academy of St Martin-in-the-Fields, Neville Marriner. Bach Cantatas. EMI, 1973.
- Amsterdam Baroque Orchestra, Ton Koopman. J.S. Bach: Complete Cantatas Vol. 4. Erato, 1996.
- The Bach Ensemble, Joshua Rifkin. J.S. Bach: Weichet nur betrübte Shatten "Hochzeitskantate". Decca, 1989.
- Cologne Soloists Ensemble, Helmut Müller-Brühl. Maria Stader singt Kantaten von Johann Sebastian Bach. Pelca, 1965.
- Orchestra of the Bach Guild, Anton Heiller. J.S. Bach: Cantata Nr. 51; Cantata Nr. 209. Amadeo, 1952.
- Ensemble Sonnerie, Monica Huggett. J.S. Bach - Cantatas. EMI/Virgin Classics, 1999.
- Bach Collegium Japan & Masaaki Suzuki. Bach: The Secular Cantatas; Non sa che sia dolore BWV 209. BIS, 2019.
- J. S. Bach-Stiftung & Rudolf Lutz. Bachkantate, BWV 209 - Non sa che sia dolore, 2026.
