= Quodlibet, BWV 524 =

Lighthearted vocal composition by Johann Sebastian Bach

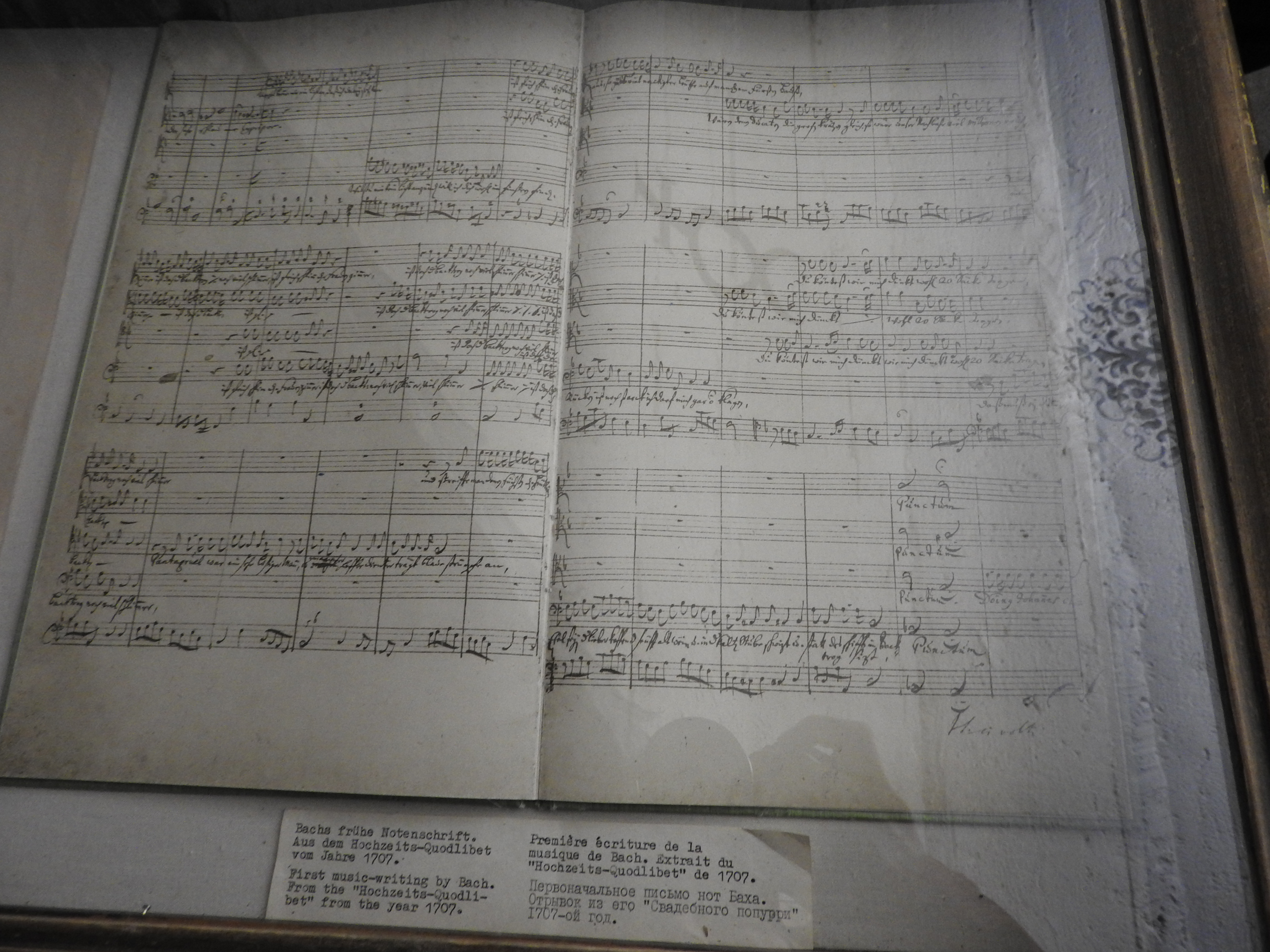
The manuscript of the Wedding Quodlibet shows Bach's early handwriting

The Quodlibet or Wedding Quodlibet, BWV 524, is a lighthearted composition by Johann Sebastian Bach which today exists only in fragmentary form. The line "In diesem Jahre haben wir zwei Sonnenfinsternissen" (In this year we have [seen] two solar eclipses) places the composition of the piece in or shortly after 1707, when central Germany was witness to two such celestial events. The extant source—a fair-copy autograph manuscript on three large, folded sheets—was not discovered until 1932.

The work itself is a loosely structured quodlibet for SATB and continuo. Bach likely did not write the text, which some attribute to the Leipzig poet Johann Christoph Gottsched. Though the cover sheet has been lost, the libretto of the remaining portion indicates that the quodlibet was to be performed at a wedding, possibly that of the composer himself to Maria Barbara Bach.
