= Der Himmel dacht auf Anhalts Ruhm und Glück, BWV 66a =

Cantata by Johann Sebastian Bach

Der Himmel dacht auf Anhalts Ruhm und Glück (Since heaven cared for Anhalt's fame and bliss), BWV 66.1, BWV 66a, is a congratulatory cantata by Johann Sebastian Bach. The work was first performed in Köthen on 10 December 1718. The music has been lost apart from a fragment, but Bach appears to have recycled some of his material in other works, allowing for the cantata's partial reconstruction.

== History ==
Bach composed the secular cantata, or serenata, in 1718 in Köthen to celebrate the twenty-fourth birthday of his employer Leopold, Prince of Anhalt-Köthen on 10 December. Bach's duties included directing a small orchestra, and his stay at Köthen tends to be associated with instrumental compositions, but he had the opportunity to compose some vocal music as the court also employed singers, although usually on a temporary basis.

The cantata text was by Christian Friedrich Hunold, who was based at Halle about twenty-three miles from Köthen. Bach and Hunold collaborated on other cantatas, including one for the same birthday, Lobet den Herrn, alle seine Heerscharen, BWV Anh. 5. Hunold's text was included in a collection, Auserlesene und theils noch nie gedruckte Gedichte (Selected and partly never printed poems), which he published the following year, and has thus survived. Bach's music has been lost apart from a fragment, but there is scope for its reconstruction as he recycled some of it in at least one sacred work.

Bach adapted several movements for his 1724 cantata for Easter Monday, Erfreut euch, ihr Herzen, BWV 66.2. While the structure of the sacred cantata is different (it is closed with a chorale, and it opens with music from the closing movement of the secular cantata), Bach preserved the original dialogue form in which two allegorical figures appear. For Die Glückseeligkeit Anhalts (Fortune of Anhalt) and Fama (Fame), he substituted the alto "Fear" in place of Fortune and the tenor "Hope" in place of Fame.

John Eliot Gardiner has suggested that instrumental music from the lost cantata survives in another cantata from the composer's Leipzig years. The music in question, a sinfonia for strings and woodwind, is the first movement of Am Abend aber desselbigen Sabbats, BWV 42, which was first performed in 1725.

== Structure ==
The work has eight movements:

1. Recitative: Der Himmel dacht' auf Anhalts Ruhm und Glück
2. Aria: Traget ihr Lüffte den Jubel von hinnen
3. Duet recitative: Die Klugheit auf dem Thron zu sehn
4. Duet aria: Ich weiche nun; ich will der Erden sagen
5. Duet recitative: Wie weit bist du mit Anhälts Götter-Ruhm
6. Aria: Beglücktes Land von süsser Ruh und Stille!
7. Duet recitative: Nun theurer Fürst! der seinen Purpur schmücket
8. Chorus: Es strahle die Sonne

== Publication ==
Der Himmel dacht auf Anhalts Ruhm und Glück was published in the Neue Bach-Ausgabe, edited by Alfred Dürr, with a critical report 1964. The cantata was published in a critical edition of Alexander Grychtolik's reconstruction by Breitkopf & Härtel.

== Recordings ==
- Mitteldeutsche Hofmusik, Alexander Grychtolik. Ruhm und Glück (Fame and Happiness). Rondeau Production, 2012.
