= Auf, schmetternde Töne der muntern Trompeten, BWV 207a =

Secular cantata by J. S. Bach

Auf, schmetternde Töne der muntern Trompeten (Arise, blaring tones of high-spirited trumpets), BWV 207.2 (previously BWV 207a), is a secular cantata composed by Johann Sebastian Bach and likely premiered in 1735. It utilizes the music from the third movement of the Brandenburg Concerto No. 1 in F major.

== Composition ==
This cantata was composed for the name day of the Elector of Saxony, King Augustus III of Poland which was celebrated on 3 August. The work was likely premiered in Leipzig in 1735. It is largely based on an earlier secular cantata Vereinigte Zwietracht der wechselnden Saiten, BWV 207.1, which was first performed in 1726.

It is counted among the works Bach wrote for celebrations of the Leipzig University, Festmusiken zu Leipziger Universitätsfeiern.

== Scoring and structure ==
The cantata is scored for soprano, alto, tenor, and bass soloists, four-part choir, three trumpets, timpani, two flauto traverso, two oboes d'amore, tenor oboe (taille), bassoon, two violins, viola, and basso continuo.

The movements are as follows:

1. Chorus: Auf, schmetternde Töne der muntern Trompeten
2. Recitative (tenor): Die stille Pleiße spielt
3. Aria (tenor): Augustus' Namenstages Schimmer
4. Duet recitative (soprano and bass): Augustus' Wohl
5. Duet aria (soprano and bass) and ritornello: Mich kann die süße Ruhe laben
6. Recitative (alto): Augustus schützt die frohen Felder
7. Aria (alto): Preiset, späte Folgezeiten
8. Recitative (SATB): Ihr Fröhlichen, herbei
9. Chorus: August lebe
10. March

== Recordings ==
- Amsterdam Baroque Orchestra & Choir, Ton Koopman. J.S. Bach: Complete Cantatas Vol. 5. Erato, 1996.
- Gächinger Kantorei Stuttgart / Bach-Collegium Stuttgart, Helmuth Rilling. Edition Bachakademie Vol. 64. Hänssler, 1995.
- Kammerchor Stuttgart / Concerto Köln, Frieder Bernius. J.S. Bach Secular Cantatas BWV 206 & 207a. Sony Classical, 1990.
- Bach Collegium Japan, Masaaki Suzuki. J. S. Bach: Secular Cantatas, Vol. 9. BIS, 2017.
