= Ihr Tore zu Zion, BWV 193 =

Cantata by J. S. Bach

Ihr Tore zu Zion
- BWV 193
- Sacred cantata by Johann Sebastian Bach
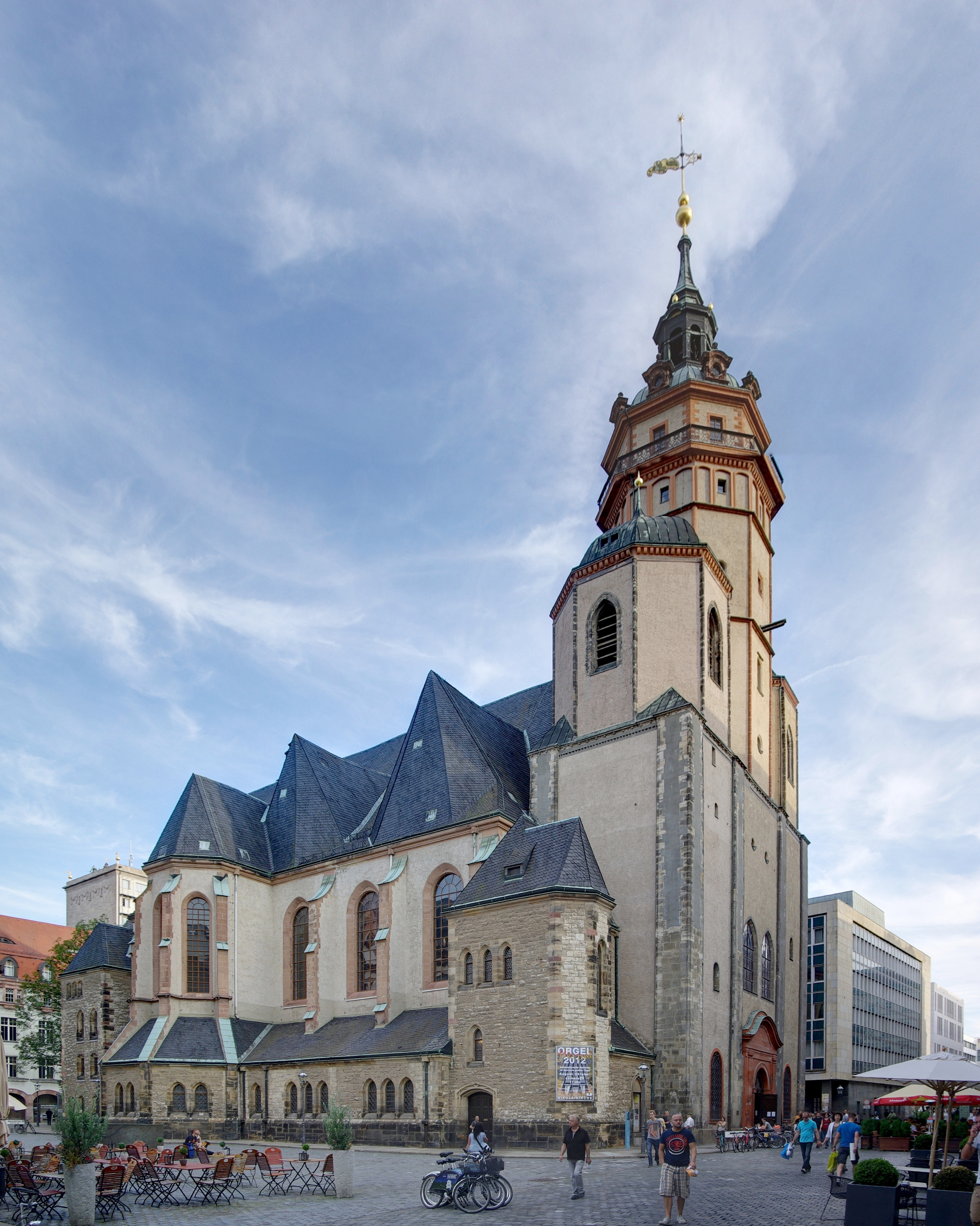
- Nikolaikirche, Leipzig (2012)
- Related: BWV 193a
- Occasion: Ratswechsel (Inauguration of new town council)
- Performed: 25 August 1727: Leipzig
- Movements: 7
- Vocal: SATB choir (only soprano and alto extant)
- Instrumental: incomplete: 2 oboes; 2 violins; viola

Ihr Tore zu Zion also called Ihr Pforten zu Zion (You gates of Zion), BWV 193, is a sacred cantata by Johann Sebastian Bach. He composed it in Leipzig for Ratswechsel, the inauguration of a new town council, in 1727 and first performed it on 25 August 1727. The music survives in an incomplete state.

== History and words ==
While living in Leipzig Bach composed several cantatas for the Ratswechsel, the inauguration of the newly elected town council. This event took place in a festive service, which was not part of the liturgical year, on the Monday following the feast of St. Bartholomew on 24 August. In 1723, Bach's first year in Leipzig, he began the series with Preise, Jerusalem, den Herrn, BWV 119. Another cantata was performed in 1725, but only the text has survived. Bach first performed Ihr Tore zu Zion, BWV 193 on 25 August 1727 at St. Nicholas Church.

The words are by an unknown poet, who is assumed by Christoph Wolff to have been Bach's regular collaborator Picander, the librettist of the related secular cantata. The text identifies Leipzig with the holy city of Jerusalem, praising God as the protector of the "Leipziger Jerusalem". Ideas from psalms are included, using Psalm 87:2, "The Lord loveth the gates of Zion more than all the dwellings of Jacob." in movement 1, and Psalm 121:4, "Behold, he that keepeth Israel shall neither slumber nor sleep." in movement 2.

The work shared material with a secular cantata which premiered the same month. Ihr Häuser des Himmels, ihr scheinenden Lichter, BWV 193a, was a dramma per musica (drama for music) composed for the name day of Augustus II the Strong on 3 August 1727. Movements 1, 3 and 5 of Ihr Tore zu Zion are probably a parody of the secular work. However, the music of this piece is also lost. According to Alfred Dürr, both works may include earlier music, perhaps composed in Köthen. One movement of the text of Ihr Tore zu Zion, a recitative, is lost. The first chorus is repeated at the end as is stated at the end of most extant parts ("Chorus ab initio repetatur").

The surviving music was first published in 1894. It cannot be given a satisfactory performance without a certain amount of reconstruction of lost material, as the parts for tenor, bass, basso continuo and other instruments (probably trumpets and timpani, maybe also flutes) for all of the music are missing. A reconstruction was made for Helmuth Rilling in 1983 by Reinhold Kubik. Ton Koopman made a version for his 1999 recording, adding a recitative for bass at the end. Other reconstructions of the work were made by Michael Radulesco and Alan Dergal Rautenberg. To achieve the scoring Bach usually used for festive occasions, all of these reconstructions restore the missing tenor and bass parts in the opening chorus as well as the basso continuo for the whole work and add trumpets and timpani.

== Scoring and structure ==
The music in seven movements survives in an incomplete state. Only two vocal parts are extant (soprano and alto). The parts for tenor and bass are missing. The instrumental parts which survive are for two oboes, two violins and viola. The continuo line is missing completely, as are parts for any additional instruments deployed by Bach. For a festive occasion he typically scored trumpets and timpani.

1. Chorus: Ihr Tore zu Zion
2. Recitative (soprano): Der Hüter Israels entschläft noch schlummert nicht
3. Aria (soprano): Gott, wir danken deiner Güte
4. Recitative (alto): O Leipziger Jerusalem
5. Aria (alto): Sende, Herr, den Segen ein
6. Recitative [lost]
7. Chorus ab initio repetatur (repeated from the beginning)

== Music ==
The chorus is opened by a long ritornello, which is repeated completely in the middle of the movement, but not in the end. The existing vocal parts suggest that the choral writing was mostly in homophony.

The first aria is a minuet in da capo form. Musicologist Julian Mincham likens the interplay of oboe and strings to music of Handel. They begin in unison, then the oboe plays only the top notes of the strings, finally it "emerges with its own melody". In the second aria for alto, oboe and continuo, the ornamentation of the oboe stands for God's blessings. Mincham concludes from the unison of voice and oboe from measure 13 that mankind is depicted in tune with it.

== Recordings ==
- Die Bach Kantate Vol. 67, Helmuth Rilling, Gächinger Kantorei, Bach-Collegium Stuttgart, Arleen Augér, Julia Hamari, Hänssler 1983
- J. S. Bach: Complete Cantatas Vol. 19, Ton Koopman, Amsterdam Baroque Orchestra & Choir, Caroline Stam, Michael Chance, Paul Agnew, Antoine Marchand 1999

== Sources ==
- Ihr Tore zu Zion, BWV 193: Scores at the International Music Score Library Project
- "Ihr Tore zu Zion, BWV 193; BC B 5 / Cantata". Leipzig University.
- "Cantata BWV 193 Ihr Tore zu Zion, history, scoring, sources for text and music, translations to various languages, discography, discussion, Bach Cantatas website
- "Ihr Tore zu Zion", history, scoring, Bach website (in German)
- "BWV 193 Ihr Tore /Pforten/ zu Zion", English translation, University of Vermont
- "BWV 193 Ihr Tore zu Zion", text, scoring, University of Alberta (in German)
