= Johann Friedrich Ludwig Volckmann =

German theologian and lawyer

- Born: 22 January 1758; Arnstadt, Principality of Schwarzburg-Sondershausen, Holy Roman Empire
- Died: 15 October 1815 (aged 57); Arnstadt, Principality of Schwarzburg-Sondershausen, German Confederation
- Occupation(s): Theologian, lawyer

Johann Friedrich Ludwig Volckmann (22 January 1758 – 15 October 1815) was a German theologian, lawyer and animal rights writer.

== Biography ==
Volckmann studied theology (1777–1780) and law in Leipzig. He worked in his hometown of Arnstadt as a bailiff and later as a government and court advocate. In 1794, he founded the Verein der Literaturfreunde zu Arnstadt (Association of Friends of Literature in Arnstadt).

In 1799, Volckmann authored Menschenstolz und Thierqualen, an early animal rights work. It was republished in 2018. In the book Volckmann stated that animals possess "memory, phantasy, moral sense" and some degree of rationality.

Volckmann argued that if man showed a higher admiration for the talents of animals, he would abstain from practicing cruelty. Volckmann was one of the earliest writers to apply the term "rights" to animals.

He married Wilhelmine Albertine Friederike Schöneweck in 1804.

== Selected publications ==
- Menschenstolz und Thierqualen (translated Human Pride and Animal Torture, 1799)

== See also ==
- Herman Daggett
- Wilhelm Dietler
