= Ich bin in mir vergnügt, BWV 204 =

Secular cantata by Johann Sebastian Bach

Ich bin in mir vergnügt (I am content in myself), BWV 204, (Note: "BWV" is Bach-Werke-Verzeichnis, a thematic catalogue of Bach's works.) is a secular cantata composed by Johann Sebastian Bach in Leipzig between 1726 and 1727.

== History and text ==
Bach composed this cantata in Leipzig between 1726 and 1727 for an unknown occasion. The text is drawn from the work of Christian Friedrich Hunold. Hunold and Bach are assumed to have met, but the librettist died in 1721, which is well before the cantata appears to have been composed.

The music of the closing aria was reused in the wedding cantata Vergnügte PleißenStadt, BWV 216 of 1728.

== Scoring and structure ==
The cantata is scored for soprano soloist, flauto traverso, two oboes, two violins, viola, and basso continuo.

It has eight movements:

1. Recitative: Ich bin in mir vergnügt
2. Aria: Ruhig und in sich zufrieden
3. Recitative: Ihr Seelen, die ihr außer euch
4. Aria: Die Schätzbarkeit der weiten Erden
5. Recitative: Schwer ist es zwar, viel Eitles zu besitzen
6. Aria: Meine Seele sei vergnügt
7. Recitative: Ein edler Mensch ist Perlenmuscheln gleich
8. Aria: Himmlische Vergnügsamkeit

== Music ==
The opening recitative is harmonically active but melodically fragmented because of the unusual choice to set balanced couplets in recitative. The first aria is characterized by a "restless feeling of effort" beginning immediately after the short instrumental ritornello, and is the only one in da capo form. The second recitative is the only one to be accompagnato, with the strings supporting a harmony that "begins to slide around like quicksand". The second aria has a flowing ritornello theme provided by continuo and obbligato violin. The third recitative is secco with "two bursts of operatic virtuosity". The third aria is in ternary form and minor mode. The fourth recitative includes an arioso passage ending on an "exceedingly odd" cadence. The final movement is the only one to include all instrumental parts, with a dance-like opening theme and an ABAB structure.

== Recordings ==
- Amsterdam Baroque Orchestra, Ton Koopman. J.S. Bach: Complete Cantatas Vol. 4. Erato, 1996.
- Bach-Collegium Stuttgart, Helmuth Rilling. Edition Bachakademie Vol. 62. Hänssler, 1998.
- Württemberg Chamber Orchestra, Rudolf Ewerhart. Bach Cantatas. Vox, 1966.
- Bach Collegium Japan, Masaaki Suzuki. J. S. Bach: Secular Cantatas, Vol. 10. BIS, 2018.
