= Froher Tag, verlangte Stunden, BWV Anh. 18 =

Cantata by Johann Sebastian Bach

Froher Tag, verlangte Stunden (Happy day, long hoped-for hours), BWV Anh. 18, (Note: "BWV" is Bach-Werke-Verzeichnis, a thematic catalogue of Bach's works.) is a cantata by J.S. Bach. He composed the work for the inauguration of a renovation of the Thomasschule, Leipzig. It was first performed on 5 June 1732. The music is lost but the words have survived. They are by Johann Heinrich Winckler, a teacher at the school.

In 1731 work began on the reconstruction of the school building, giving it two more storeys. The Bach family, along with other residents, had to move out for a year. On the Bachs' return they benefited from an enlarged apartment. The building is no longer extant.

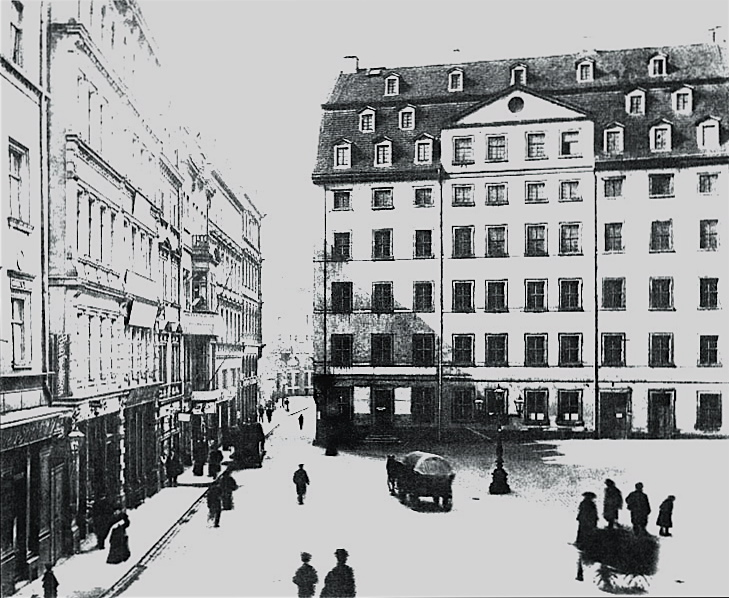
The Thomasschule where Bach had his apartment

== Libretto and structure ==
Winckler was a colleague of Bach at the Thomasschule. He was a versatile scholar whose interests included experimental physics, and he was later elected Fellow of the Royal Society.

The cantata has 10 movements. In the middle of the work there was a pause for speeches, rather as some church cantatas were performed before and after the sermon. The movements are as follows:

1. Froher Tag, verlangte Stunden
2. Wir stellen uns jetzt vor
3. Väter unsrer Linden-Stadt
4. Begierd und Trieb zum Wissen
5. So laßt uns durch Reden und Mienen entdecken
6. Geist und Seele sind begierig
7. So groß ist Wohl und Glück
8. Doch man ist nicht frey und los
9. Wenn Weisheit und Verstand
10. Ewiges Wesen, das alles erschafft

== Music ==
Bach often reused music written for one-off occasions. In this case, he is believed to have reused the music for firstly another lost work Frohes Volk, vergnügte Sachsen, BWV Anh. 12 (composed in 1733 for the name day of the Elector of Saxony to a libretto by Picander). Additionally it was likely used for the chorus which opens Lobet Gott in seinen Reichen, BWV 11 (probably composed in 1735). The chorus employs Lombard rhythm and is given a festive scoring with an instrumental ensemble featuring three trumpets.
