= Alexander Grychtolik =

- Born: Alexander Ferdinand Grychtolik; 6 September 1980 (age 45); Berlin, Germany
- Education: Musikhochschule Weimar
- Occupations: Harpsichordist; Classical organist; Musicologist
- Website: www.grychtolik.com

Alexander Ferdinand Grychtolik (born 6 September 1980 in Berlin) is a German harpsichordist, improviser, musicologist and academic.

Grychtolik is married to the harpsichordist Aleksandra Magdalena Grychtolik, with whom he has appeared in concert.

== Career ==
Grychtolik graduated from the Hochschule für Musik "Franz Liszt", Weimar, where he began research and work on his idea that it would be possible to digitally reconstruct selected works from Bach's Weimar period, creating a historical concert in a virtual church. Grychtolik received the school's Franz Liszt Prize in 2005. He studied the harpsichord with Bernhard Klapprott and with Frédérick Haas at the Royal Conservatory of Brussels. He also studied architecture at Bauhaus-University Weimar, where he published an article about the concert halls of the GDR.

Grychtolik has played at several European early music festivals. He has lectured at various conservatories such as Frankfurt and taught Baroque improvisation at the Hochschule für Musik "Franz Liszt", Weimar, the first such teaching position in Germany.

He specializes in the field of early music, Baroque improvisation and composition. He has reconstructed various vocal works of Johann Sebastian Bach which have received much attention.

== Bach reconstructions ==
He edited the St. Mark Passion (performed in 1744) as a stylistically consistent reconstruction, published by Edition Peters. This work was lost, the last known copy having burned in 1945. It was completely reconstructed by Grychtolik.

The reconstruction of the St. Mark Passion was first performed on 1 April 2007 as part of the festival Thüringer Bachwochen (Thuringia's Weeks of Bach) in Weimar's town church St. Peter und Paul, where several of Bach's children were baptized. Klaus-Jürgen Teutschbein conducted; Grychtolik played the harpsichord. It was again performed in the St. Jakob's church in Köthen, where Bach once lived and worked, as part of its 23rd Bach Festival (Köthener Bachfesttage). The day before the concert, Grychtolik participated in a panel discussion and had to answer questions about his Bach "parody" from Bach experts who are critical of his efforts.

He edited the first full reconstruction of the funeral cantata Klagt, Kinder, klagt es aller Welt, BWV 244a, also called Köthener Trauermusik, which Bach used as the base for his St Matthew Passion. The Köthener Trauermusik was performed in March 2010 by the Lautten Compagney in the Sophienkirche Berlin and the Kammermusiksaal of the Deutschlandfunk in Cologne and later broadcast on radio. A performance on 11 May 2010 was aired by Austrian broadcaster ORF.

At the Köthener Bachfesttage 2012 Grychtolik conducted the Mitteldeutsche Hofmusik ensemble in performances of the reconstructions of birthday cantatas Steigt freudig in die Luft, BWV 36a and Der Himmel dacht auf Anhalts Ruhm und Glück, BWV 66a.

Bach's O angenehme Melodei, BWV 210a, only survives as a fragment. However, because Bach used it for his wedding cantata O holder Tag, erwünschte Zeit, BWV 210, it was possible to reconstruct the piece. Grychtolik's work makes it possible to perform the cantata in concert. Together with a reconstruction of Erwählte Pleißenstadt, BWV 216a it was recorded and released by Grychtolik in 2017.
