= Schleicht, spielende Wellen, BWV 206 =

1736 secular cantata by J S Bach

Schleicht, spielende Wellen (Glide, O sparkling waves and murmur softly), BWV 206, (Note: "BWV" is Bach-Werke-Verzeichnis, a thematic catalogue of Bach's works.) is a secular cantata composed by Johann Sebastian Bach in Leipzig and first performed on 7 October 1736.

== History and text ==
Bach composed this cantata for the birthday of Augustus III of Poland and Elector of Saxony. It was first performed in Leipzig, Saxony, on 7 October 1736. A second performance took place on 3 August 1740.

The librettist of the work is unknown, but was likely Picander. The cantata is counted among the works Bach wrote for celebrations of Leipzig University, Festmusiken zu Leipziger Universitätsfeiern.

== Scoring and structure ==
The cantata features four solo vocal parts, representing rivers: Pleiße (soprano), Donau (alto), Elbe (tenor), and Weichsel (bass). (Note: The Pleiße flows through Leipzig into the Elbe, the Vistula (German: Weichsel) is the longest and largest river in Poland, and the Danube (Donau), flows through Austria, which Augustus later supported against Prussia in the War of the Austrian Succession.) The cantata is also scored for four-part choir, three flutes, two oboes, two oboes d'amore, three trumpets, timpani, 1st and 2nd violins, violas, and basso continuo.

It has eleven movements:

1. Chorus: Schleicht, spielende Wellen, und murmelt gelinde
2. Recitative (bass): O glückliche Veränderung
3. Aria (bass): Schleuß des Janustempels Türen
4. Recitative (tenor): So recht! beglückter Weichselstrom
5. Aria (tenor): Jede Woge meiner Wellen
6. Recitative (alto): Ich nehm zugleich an deiner Freude teil
7. Aria (alto): Reis von Habsburgs hohem Stamme
8. Recitative (soprano): Verzeiht, Bemooste Häupter starker Ströme
9. Aria (soprano): Hört doch! der sanften Flöten Chor
10. Recitative (SATB): Ich muss, ich will gehorsam sein
11. Chorus: Die himmlische Vorsicht der ewigen Güte

== Recordings ==
- Amsterdam Baroque Orchestra & Choir, Ton Koopman. J.S. Bach: Complete Cantatas Vol. 5. Erato, 1996.
- Gächinger Kantorei Stuttgart / Bach-Collegium Stuttgart, Helmuth Rilling. Edition Bachakademie Vol. 64. Hänssler, 1994.
- Kammerchor Stuttgart / Concerto Köln, Frieder Bernius. J.S. Bach Secular Cantatas BWV 206 & 207a. Sony Classical, 1990.
- Ex Tempore Choir, Florian Heyerick / Musica Antiqua Köln, Reinhard Goebel BWV 36c, 201, 206, 207, Quodlibet BWV 524. Archiv Produktion 457 348-2, 1996 & 1997.
