= Zerreißet, zersprenget, zertrümmert die Gruft, BWV 205 =

Secular cantata by Johann Sebastian Bach

Zerreißet, zersprenget, zertrümmert die Gruft: BWV 205.1; BWV 205
- Dramma per musica; Secular cantata; by Johann Sebastian Bach
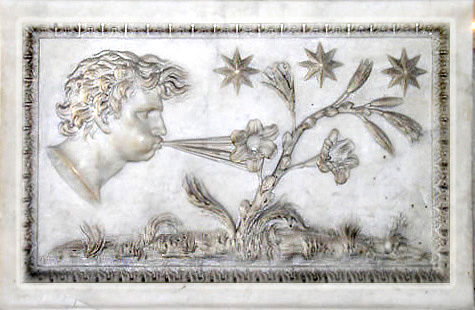
- Aeolus, a Greek god of the wind
- Other name: Der zufriedengestellte Aeolus
- Text: by Picander
- Performed: 3 August 1725: Leipzig

Zerreißet, zersprenget, zertrümmert die Gruft (Destroy, burst, shatter the tomb) or Der zufriedengestellte Aeolus (The contented Aeolus), BWV 205.1, BWV 205, is a secular cantata or dramma per musica by Johann Sebastian Bach. It was written for the name day of August Friedrich Müller, and was first performed on 3 August 1725. The libretto by Picander is based on Greek mythology.

== History and text ==
The cantata was commissioned by the students of Leipzig University for the popular professor August Friedrich Müller and premiered on his name day on 3 August 1725 as a dramma per musica under the title Der zufriedengestellte Aeolus (The contented Aeolus).

Its libretto was written by Christian Friedrich Henrici and begins with Pallas Athene (sung by a soprano) setting up a celebration in honour of Müller. However, she fears that Aeolus (bass) could ruin the celebrations with heavy storms in August. With the help of Zephyrus (tenor), the god of mild winds, and Pomona, the goddess of fruitfulness (alto), Pallas manages to appease Aeolus, and those present grant a vivat in unison for the professor.

Bach wrote other works for university occasions: the cantata is one of twelve surviving Festmusiken zu Leipziger Universitätsfeiern (Music for festivities of the Leipzig University).

He used music from the work for an aria of his cantata Gott, wie dein Name, so ist auch dein Ruhm, BWV 171, composed for New Year's Day 1729.

== Scoring and structure ==
The cantata is scored for four solo voices – Pallas as soprano, Pomona as alto, Zephyrus as tenor, and Aeolus as bass – a four-part choir, three trumpets, timpani, two horns, two flutes, two oboes, oboe d'amore, two violins, viola, viola d'amore, viola da gamba, and basso continuo.

The piece has fifteen movements:

1. Chorus: Zerreißet, zersprenget, zertrümmert die Gruft
2. Recitative (bass): Ja! ja! Die Stunden sind nunmehro nah
3. Aria (bass): Wie will ich lustig lachen
4. Recitative (tenor): Gefürcht'ter Aeolus
5. Aria (tenor): Frische Schatten, meine Freude
6. Recitative (bass): Beinahe wirst du mich bewegen
7. Aria (alto): Können nicht die roten Wangen
8. Duet recitative (alto and soprano): So willst du, grimmger Aeolus
9. Aria (soprano): Angenehmer Zephyrus
10. Duet recitative (soprano and bass): Mein Aeolus
11. Aria (bass): Zurücke, zurücke, geflügelten Winde
12. Trio recitative (soprano, alto, tenor): Was Lust!
13. Duet aria (alto and tenor): Zweig und Äste
14. Recitative (soprano): Ja, ja! ich lad euch selbst zu dieser Feier ein
15. Chorus: Vivat August

== Recordings ==
- Figuralchor der Gedächtniskirche Stuttgart / Bach-Collegium Stuttgart, Helmuth Rilling. J. S. Bach: Der zufriedengestellte Äolus BWV 205 · Cembalokonzert Nr. 3. MHS, 1967.
- Concentus Musicus Wien & Arnold Schönberg Choir, Nicolaus Harnoncourt. J. S. Bach: Complete Cantatas Vol. 7. Teldec, 1988.
- Amsterdam Baroque Orchestra & Choir, Ton Koopman. J. S. Bach: Complete Cantatas Vol. 5. Erato, 1996.
- Gächinger Kantorei / Bach-Collegium Stuttgart, Helmuth Rilling. Edition Bachakademie Vol. 63. Hänssler, 1999.
- I Barocchisti / Coro della Radio Svizzera, Diego Fasolis. J. S. Bach: Der zufriedengestellte Aeolus BWV 205 / Cantata BWV 110. ARTS, 2007.
- Bach Collegium Japan, Masaaki Suzuki. J. S. Bach: Secular Cantatas Vol. 4. BIS, 2014.
