= Christian Friedrich Hunold =

German author

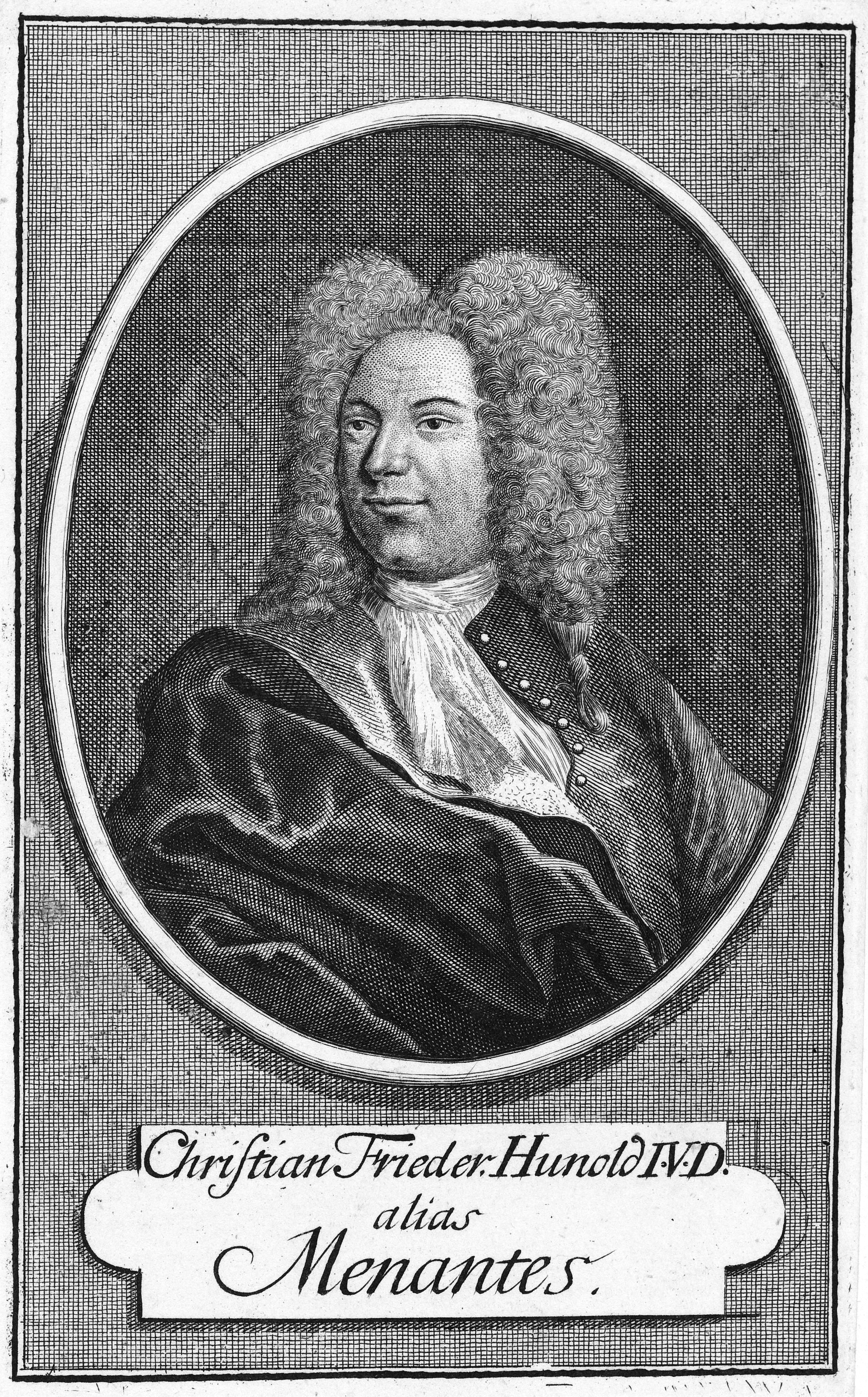
Christian Friedrich Hunold

Christian Friedrich Hunold (born 29 September 1680 in Wandersleben near Gotha, died 16 August 1721 in Halle) was a German author who wrote under the pseudonym Menantes.

== Biography ==
Hunold went to school in Arnstadt and continued in 1691 at the Gymnasium Illustre Augusteum in Weißenfels until 1698. From 1698 until winter 1699/1700 he studied law and languages at the University of Jena.

His first novel, Die Verliebte und Galante Welt (Hamburg: Liebernickel, 1700), was an instant success. The publication of his novel Satyrischer Roman (Satyrical Novel) in 1706 caused a scandal.

Hunold moved to Halle and held private seminars. The second part of Satyrischer Roman was published in Stade by Hinrich Brummer in 1710. Hunold continued his own studies and graduated in 1714 in law.

He died 6 August 1721 in Halle of tuberculosis.

A biography of him by Benjamin Wedel was published in 1731 including some of his letters.

== Libretti ==
Hunold wrote the libretto Der blutige und sterbende Jesus (The bleeding and dying Jesus), set by Reinhard Keiser in 1704, an early Protestant Passion oratorio.

Hunold appears to have known Bach, and in Halle he wrote texts for Bach cantatas which were performed at the court of Leopold, Prince of Anhalt-Köthen. With the partial exception of Lobet den Herrn, alle seine Heerscharen, BWV Anh. 5, which uses religious themes, these were secular works, written especially for occasions such as birthdays. This collaboration between Bach and Hunold lasted from 1718 to 1720 after which year the composer found another librettist for his continuing series of congratulatory cantatas. After the poet had died Bach returned to his work as the basis for the cantata Ich bin in mir vergnügt.

== Selected works ==
- Die verliebte und galante Welt, Hamburg: Liebernickel, 1700 (reprint of the 1707 edition Hans Wagener: Bern 1988)
- Der Europäischen Höfe Liebes- und Helden-Geschichte, Hamburg: Gottfried Liebernickel, 1705 (reprint Hans Wagener and Eli Sobel: Bern 1978)
- Satyrischer Roman der galanten Welt zur vergnügten Curiosite, ans Licht gestellt von Menantes, Hamburg: B. Wedel, 1706 (reprint Hans Wagener: Frankfurt am Main 2005, ISBN 3-86598-219-0; online: Editions Marteau)

== Sources ==
- Benjamin Wedel: Geheime Nachrichten und Briefe von Herrn Menantes Leben und Schriften. Cöln 1731 (reprint Zentralantiquariat der DDR, Leipzig 1977)
- Hans Schröder: Lexikon der hamburgischen Schriftsteller bis zur Gegenwart. 8 volumes. Perthes-Besser u. Mauke, Hamburg 1851–1883
- Herbert Singer: Der galante Roman. Metzler, Stuttgart 1961.
- Herbert Singer: Der deutsche Roman zwischen Barock und Rokoko. Böhlau, Köln 1963
- Hans Wagener, Die Komposition der Romane Christian Friedrich Hunolds, University of California Publications in Modern Philology, 94 (Berkeley/ Los Angeles, 1969)
- Gerhard Dünnhaupt: "Christian Friedrich Hunold (1681–1721)", in: Personalbibliographien zu den Drucken des Barock. Band 3. Hiersemann, Stuttgart 1990, ISBN 3-7772-9105-6, p. 2184–2213 (works and literature)
- Jens-Fietje Dwars: Leben und Werk des vormals berühmten Christian Friedrich Hunold alias Menantes. quartus-Verlag, Bucha 2005, ISBN 3-931505-74-X
- Cornelia Hobohm (editor.): Menantes. Ein Dichterleben zwischen Barock und Aufklärung. Jena: Quartus Verlag, 2006)
- Jörn Steigerwald: Höfliches Lachen: Die distinguierende Komik der höfischen Gesellschaft (am Beispiel von Christian Friedrich Hunolds 'Satyrischem Roman' , in: Anthropologie und Medialität des Komischen im 17. Jahrhundert (1580–1730). editor Stefanie Arend et al. Amsterdam / New York 2008, p. 325–355.
