= Easter Oratorio =

1728 oratorio by J. S. Bach

- BWV 249 · 249.3–5
- Oratorio by J. S. Bach
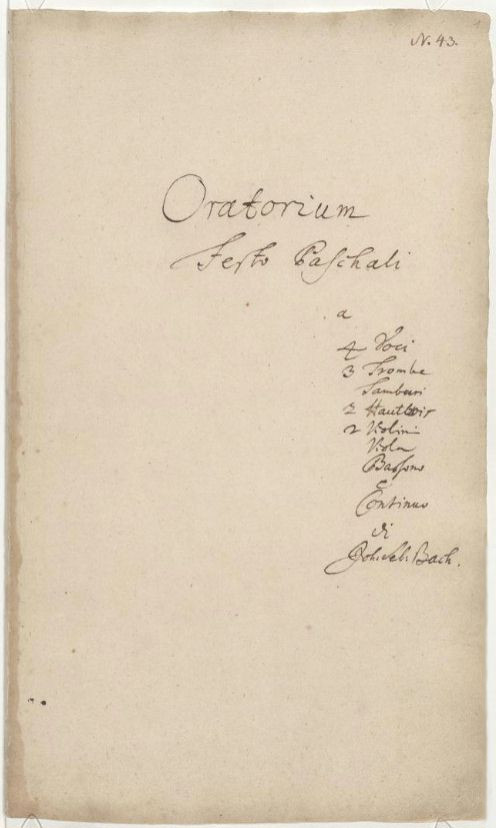
- Title page of the 1738 autograph with the title in Latin
- Native name: Oster-Oratorium (Kommt, eilet und laufet)
- Occasion: Easter
- Cantata text: Picander
- Language: German
- Based on: Shepherd Cantata, BWV 249a (BWV 249.1)
- Performed: 1 April 1725: Leipzig (cantata); 6 April 1738 (oratorio)
- Movements: 11
- Vocal: SATB soloists and choir
- Instrumental: 3 trumpets; timpani; 2 oboes; oboe d'amore; bassoon; 2 recorders; flauto traverso; 2 violins; viola; continuo

The Easter Oratorio (Latin: Oratorium Festo Paschali; German: Oster-Oratorium), BWV 249, (Note: "BWV" is Bach-Werke-Verzeichnis, a thematic catalogue of Bach's works.) is an oratorio by Johann Sebastian Bach. He wrote an autograph score in Leipzig in 1738 under this title, matching his Christmas Oratorio and Ascension Oratorio. Bach had already composed the work in 1725, when he used most of its music for two compositions, the congratulatory Shepherd Cantata, BWV 249a (BWV 249.1), and a church cantata for Easter Sunday, Kommt, gehet und eilet ('Come, go and hurry'), BWV 249.3, that later became the oratorio. The two 1725 works, premiered a few weeks apart, are both musical dramas involving characters: in the secular cantata two shepherds and two shepherdesses, and in the Easter cantata four Biblical figures from the Easter narratives in the Gospel of Luke and other Evangelists. In the oratorio, Bach assigned the music to voice parts instead.

Bach performed the Shepherd Cantata on 23 February 1725 for his patron Christian, Duke of Saxe-Weissenfels. Its text was written by Picander, in his first documented collaboration with Bach. Picander may also have adapted his own text for the Easter cantata that Bach first performed on Easter Sunday, 1 April 1725, in both a morning service at the Nikolaikirche and a vespers service at the Thomaskirche.

In 1738, Bach revised the Easter cantata as the Easter Oratorio, BWV 249.4. He wrote an autograph manuscript of the score with the title Oratorium Festo Paschali (Easter Oratorio), making only minor changes to text and music. This version is also known as Kommt, eilet und laufet ('Come, hasten and run'). Uniquely among Bach's oratorios, it features no original Biblical text, no Evangelist narrator, and no chorale.

The work is structured in eleven movements. Two contrasting instrumental movements are followed by a duet for tenor and bass, assigned in the cantata to two disciples running to the tomb of Jesus, where they meet two women who followed Jesus (soprano and alto). The middle movements are alternating recitatives in conversation, and arias of contemplation. The final movement is a chorus of thanksgiving. The music is scored for a festive Baroque instrumental ensemble of three trumpets, timpani, a variety of wind instruments, strings and continuo. In the 1740s, Bach again revised the work (BWV 249.5), which he seems to have regarded highly, arranging the third movement partly for choir. He performed the oratorio once more in 1749, the year before his death.

Early Bach scholars, beginning with his biographer Philipp Spitta, were critical of the Easter Oratorio because of its libretto and its character as a musical drama. When the relation to the Shepherd Cantata was discovered in 1940, criticism of the parody music was added. In more recent studies, Christoph Wolff evaluates it as a skillful transformation "from theatrical into devotional music", and Markus Rathey sees the oratorio as a sequel to the St John Passion, "continuing the dramatic narrative but also its theological and musical interpretation".

== History ==
=== Background ===
In 1723, Bach was appointed Thomaskantor (director of church music) in Leipzig, where he was responsible for the music at four churches, and for the training and education of boys singing in the Thomanerchor. He took office in the middle of the liturgical year, on the first Sunday after Trinity, 30 May 1723. Bach decided to compose cantatas for almost all liturgical events for the first twelve months in office; they became his first cantata cycle. The occasions were Sundays, except for the silent times of Advent (before Christmas) and Lent (before Easter), and additional feast days; several feasts of saints were observed in Leipzig, and each of the high holidays was celebrated three days in a row. The Holy Week and Easter were thus the busiest times. For Good Friday of 1724 Bach composed the St John Passion, an extended dramatic sacred oratorio. For Easter that year, he performed on Sunday Christ lag in Todes Banden, BWV 4, which he had composed much earlier in his career, and on the following two days Easter cantatas that he could derive from congratulatory cantatas for the court of Köthen by just underlaying the music with new text, Erfreut euch, ihr Herzen, BWV 66, from the serenata Der Himmel dacht auf Anhalts Ruhm und Glück and Ein Herz, das seinen Jesum lebend weiß, BWV 134, from Die Zeit, die Tag und Jahre macht, BWV 134a, a cantata to celebrate the New Year's Day of 1719 in Köthen.

The following year, Bach went on to write a second cantata cycle, now basing each on a Lutheran hymn. Christoph Wolff described the endeavour as "a most promising project of great homogeneity, whose scope he was able to define himself". Bach kept the format until Palm Sunday of 1725, which fell on the Feast of the Annunciation that year and therefore required a cantata. He composed and performed Wie schön leuchtet der Morgenstern, BWV 1 for the occasion just one week before the Easter music. Five days later, on Good Friday, he performed the second revised version of the St John Passion.

=== Secular model, BWV 249.1 ===
In 1725, approaching his second Easter in office, Bach composed a congratulatory cantata, Entfliehet, verschwindet, entweichet, ihr Sorgen, BWV 249a, more commonly known as the Shepherd Cantata, for the 43rd birthday of his patron, Christian, Duke of Saxe-Weissenfels. During Lent, he had the free time to write an extended festive composition, reconnecting to the court.

The librettist of the Shepherd Cantata was Picander, in his first documented collaboration with Bach. It seems likely that Bach had intended from the start to use most of the music for an Easter cantata as well, and that Picander also wrote the text for that purpose. Picander would write in 1728 about their collaboration: "I flatter myself that the lack of poetic charm may be compensated for by the loveliness of the music of our incomparable Kapellmeister Bach, and that these songs may be sung in the main churches of our pious Leipzig." They also collaborated on the 1727 St Matthew Passion, described by Wolff as Picander's "finest piece of sacred poetry", and several sacred and secular cantatas.

Picander wrote the text for a dramma per musica in which two shepherds and two shepherdesses interact. The names of the men, Menalcas and Damoetas, appear in the Idylls of Theocritus and Virgil's Eclogues, while the names of the women, Doris and Sylvia, are found in works from the 17th century. Picander published the libretto in 1727, under the title Tafel-Music bei Ihro Hochfürstlichen Durchlaucht zu Weissenfels Geburts-Tage den 23. Februar 1725 ('Table music for His Serene Highness of Weissenfels's birthday on 23 February 1725'), which records the circumstances of its performance; scholars suggest that it happened, possibly at the Duke's palace, Schloss Neu-Augustusburg as a musical pastoral play in costumes at a banquet.

=== Easter cantata, BWV 249.3 (1725) ===
Bach used the music of the Shepherd Cantata in its exact sequence, composing only new recitatives, for a church cantata for Easter Sunday the same year; its title was first Kommt, gehet und eilet ('Come, go and hurry'), but it was soon changed to Kommt, fliehet und eilet ('Come, flee and hurry'). The festive nature of the original material was well suited to the celebration of Easter. Several scholars note that the work can be seen as an Easter play; Alfred Dürr pointed out that this follows a custom of "scenic representation of the Easter story".

It seems likely that Picander, who wrote the libretto for the Shepherd Cantata, also wrote the text for the Easter cantata. Both texts share the same metrical pattern in order to use the arias and the chorus without modifications. The librettist possibly based his work on an Easter narrative that the theologian Johannes Bugenhagen had compiled from the four Gospels. The librettist created text for dialogues and arias involving four Biblical characters who were assigned to the four voice parts: the disciples Simon (tenor) and John (bass) who appear in the first duet hurrying to Jesus's tomb and finding it empty, and who meet there Mary Magdalene (alto) and Mary Jacobe (soprano). The Bach scholar Hans-Joachim Schulze wrote: "On the whole, the unidentified librettist deserves every recognition for his work to appropriately transform the arias and ensembles of the secular original into the subject matter of Easter with verbal skill and fealty to content."

While the Shepherd Cantata was opened by one instrumental movement, the Easter cantata is unusually opened by two (other) instrumental movements that are probably taken from a concerto of the Köthen period. The work is, like the Shepherd Cantata, a musical drama and features no chorales, which is rare in Bach's liturgical music.

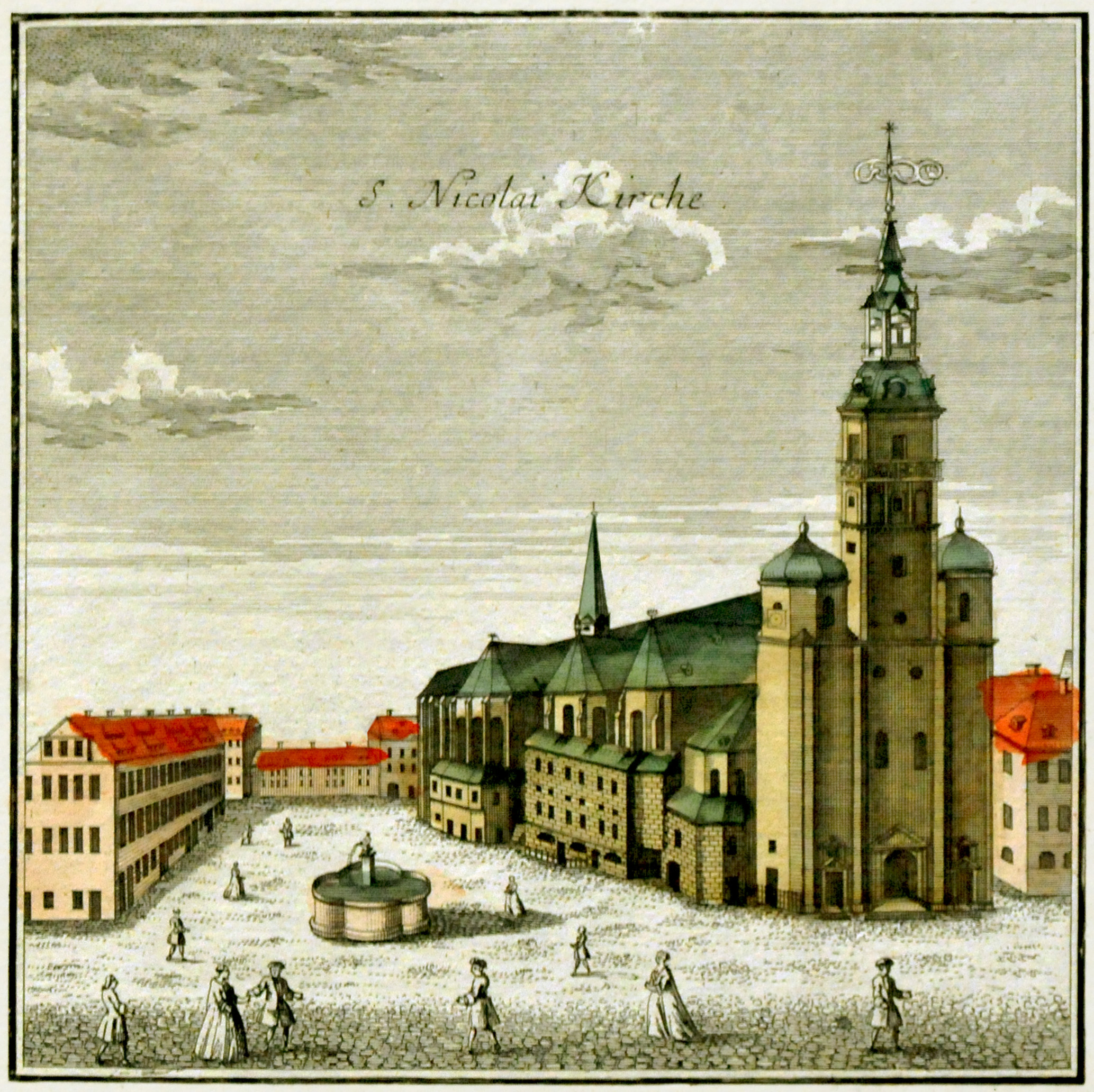
1749 engraving of Nikolaikirche, Leipzig

The cantata was first performed on Easter Sunday, 1 April 1725. Bach led the Thomanerchor, with boys singing the women's roles; they gave two performances, one in the morning service at the Nikolaikirche where Salomon Deyling gave the sermon, and the other in a vespers service at the Thomaskirche, with a sermon by Johann Gottlob Carpzov. Markus Rathey points out that this music was Bach's first and only for Easter that matched the dramatic approach of the Passions. Perhaps because of the lack of chorales and original Bible text in the new cantata, the early Easter cantata Christ lag in Todes Banden was also performed in these services.

=== Oratorio, BWV 249.4 (1738) ===
In 1733, the death of Augustus II, the Elector of Saxony, caused an official year of mourning in the electorate; performances of festive music such as cantatas were not permitted, which interrupted Bach's regular work and gave him time to plan larger musical forms. Bach composed then the Missa for the Dresden court, mostly compiled in parody style from earlier compositions. In 1734, he wrote the Christmas Oratorio, performed in six church services around Christmas and based mainly on congratulatory cantatas. Bach chose two other church events of a celebratory nature, Easter and the Feast of the Ascension, as occasions for an oratorio to be performed in the respective church services. The Ascension Oratorio was probably first performed on Ascension Day of 1738.

For Easter Sunday, 6 April 1738, Bach needed no new composition but used the 1725 Easter cantata with very minor changes. Ulrich Leisinger, who prepared a critical edition for the publisher Carus, mentioned four of them in his preface:

- the insertion of a measure of music in the first movement
- the assignment of a flauto traverso as the solo instrument in the second movement
- the use of a different underlay of the text in the middle section of the alto aria and the addition of five measures at its end for better proportion
- the assignment of an oboe d'amore instead of an oboe as the obbligato instrument in this aria.

Bach wrote an autograph score of the music and labelled the work an oratorio, titling it Oratorium Festo Paschali. In this version, Bach omitted the assignment of characters to the music and noted only the voice parts. Leisinger notes that the score is unusually rich in expression marking.

Derived from the secular musical drama, the Easter Oratorio lacks an Evangelist narrator, Biblical texts, and chorales, unlike Bach's other oratorios. Its early performance history suggests that Bach enjoyed the work.

=== Revised oratorio, BWV 249.5 (1740s) ===
Between 1743 and 1746, Bach revised the oratorio once more: he expanded the third movement from a duet into a four-part chorus, at least in the outer sections, and he changed the text underlay in the middle section of the soprano aria. This final version is the one usually performed and recorded. Conductors have to decide if the duet in the middle section of the third movement is sung by two soloists or the choir sections.

Bach performed the Easter Oratorio for the last time in 1749, the year before his death; this performance, which took place on 6 April, again followed a performance of the St John Passion on Good Friday. Wolff notes that handwritten notes in the score at the time are among the last indications of performances Bach directed.

== Music ==
=== Structure and scoring ===
Bach structured the work in eleven movements; after two instrumental movements at the beginning, the third movement is a duet, originally of two disciples moving towards the tomb of Jesus. The following movements, 4 to 10, alternate recitatives, in which the characters interact, with arias in which they express emotional reaction. The work is concluded by a chorus of praise. The music is scored for four vocal soloists (soprano (S), alto (A), tenor (T), and bass (B)), a four-part choir, and a festive Baroque instrumental ensemble of three trumpets (Tr), timpani, two oboes (Ob), oboe d'amore (Oa), bassoon (Fg), two recorders (Rec), flauto traverso (Ft), two violins (Vl), viola (Va), and basso continuo (Bc).

The following table of the movements is for the revised 1740s version, while information for earlier versions is given in brackets. The scoring, keys and time signatures are taken from Dürr, using the symbol for common time. Dürr notes a duration of 47 minutes. The timpani only play when the trumpets do and are therefore not mentioned.

No.	Type	Text (source)	Vocal	Brass and winds	Strings	Bass	Key	Time
1	Sinfonia			3(2)Tr 2Ob Fg	2Vl Va	Bc	D major	3/8
2	Adagio			Ft (Ob)	2Vl Va	Bc	B minor	3/4
3	Chorus	Kommt, eilet und laufet	SATB (T B)	3Tr 2Ob	2Vl Va	Bc	D major	3/8
4	Recitative	O kalter Männer Sinn	S A T B			Bc		common time
5	Aria	Seele, deine Spezereien	S	Ft		Bc	B minor	3/4
6	Recitative	Hier ist die Gruft	A T B			Bc		common time
7	Aria	Sanfte soll mein Todeskummer	T	2Rec	2Vl	Bc	G major	common time
8	Recitative	Indessen seufzen wir	S A			Bc		common time
9	Aria	Saget, saget mir geschwinde	A	Oa (Ob)	2Vl Va	Bc	A major	common time
10	Recitative	Wir sind erfreut	B			Bc		common time
11	Chorus	Preis und Dank	SATB	3(2)Tr 2Ob	2Vl Va	Bc	D major	3/8

=== Movements ===
The music of the arias and the closing chorus, movements 3, 5, 7, 9 and 11 in cantata and oratorio, were derived from movements 2, 4, 6, 8 and 10 of the Shepherd Cantata, while new recitatives were composed for Easter. Conductor John Eliot Gardiner and program annotator Yvonne Frindle point out that the sequence of arias resembles a dance suite. While Bach dropped the assignment of Biblical figures to voice parts in the oratorio version, they are retained in the description of the music, for clarity of the narration. Schulze notes that the listener becomes immediately included in the action and reflection, called by the initial "Kommt, eilet und laufet".

==== 1 and 2 ====
The oratorio opens with two contrasting instrumental movements, a Sinfonia, a fast concerto grosso for the full orchestra marked, and an Adagio, featuring a solo instrument and strings.

Frindle signifies that the Sinfonia with trumpets and timpani meant the return of festive music after the quiet time of Lent. It is dominated by the natural trumpets, with solo roles for a violin and a trio of oboes and cello. The music stands for victory, similar to the opening chorus of Bach's 1715 Der Himmel lacht! Die Erde jubilieret, BWV 31.

The Adagio, with sigh motifs (Seufzermotive) in the strings, is according to Gardiner reminiscent of a Venetian slow movement. Its lamenting character may illustrate the mood at the burial of Jesus, connecting to the end of the St John Passion. Bach changed the solo instrument from oboe to flauto traverso in the oratorio version.

The two movements may come from a lost concerto from Bach's Köthen period; the first movement is similar to the Brandenburg Concertos. It had been suggested that Bach derived the third movement from the same concerto, but this was rejected on the grounds that no Bach concerto had three movements in triple metre.

==== 3 ====
The first movement to be sung is the third movement, "Kommt, eilet und laufet" ('Come, hasten and run'). It has a double function: closing the concerto of the beginning in the same key and time as the first movement, and opening the dramatic section. Formally a da capo aria, it is dominated by fast runs in violins, oboes and the voices.

In the secular version, the music is always a duet, first of tenor and bass singing "Entfliehet, verschwindet, entweichet, ihr Sorgen" (Flee, dissolve, fade away, you cares). The middle section is full of coloratura that illustrate laughter and mirth in the secular work, often in parallels of thirds to illustrate the harmony of the hearts mentioned in the text. The beginning is repeated, now in response by soprano and alto.

The music for the Easter work began in the 1725 version as a duet for tenor and bass, depicting the two disciples Simon and John running to the tomb of Jesus. The upward runs now illustrate their motion. Bach retained this duet when he named the work an oratorio in 1738. In a 1740s version, Bach set its outer sections for choir, but left the middle section as a duet.

==== 4 ====
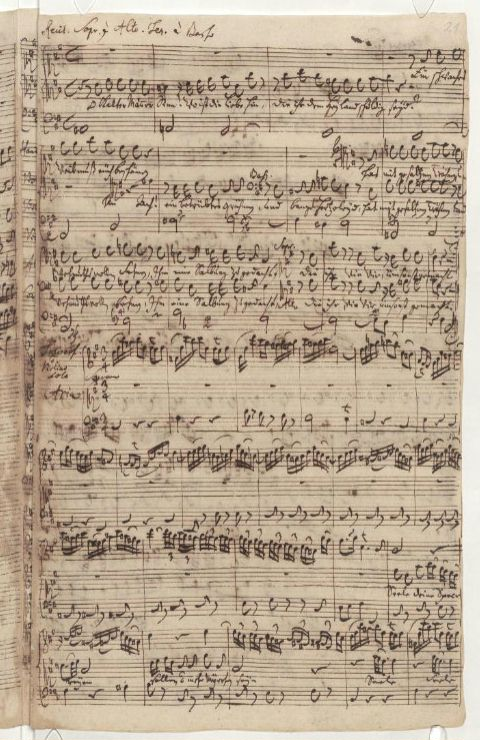
A page of the 1738 autograph, of the end of the first recitative and the beginning of the first aria

All solo voices are involved in the first recitative, "O kalter Männer Sinn!" (O cold hearts of men!), meeting at the empty tomb. The tone of the women throughout the oratorio represents the "mysticism of the bride" that shows in the Song of Songs.

==== 5 ====
The first of the arias is given to the soprano, originally as Maria Jacobe: "Seele, deine Spezereien" (O soul, your spices). While the secular original talked about "Hunderttausend Schmeicheleien" (A hundred thousand pleasantries), the woman at the tomb reflects that now, told that Jesus was no longer there, the ointments they brought for the corpse are no longer needed, and she imagines a laurel wreath for the victor. Gardiner compares the music with an obbligato flute to a minuet.

==== 6 ====
In the second recitative, "Hier ist die Gruft" (Here is the grave), the alto (originally Mary Magdalene) shares with the disciples that an angel told her that Jesus is risen.

==== 7 ====
The second aria is sung by the tenor, originally as Simon: "Sanfte soll mein Todeskummer nur ein Schlummer, Jesu, durch dein Schweißtuch sein" (Gentle shall my death-throes be only a slumber, Jesus, because of your shroud). It is written for, along with the solo tenor, muted strings (without violas), two recorders and basso continuo. In the secular aria, the topic was the sleep of the sheep: "Wieget euch, ihr satten Schafe, in dem Schlafe" (Rock yourselves, you contented sheep, into sleep),

The shroud relates to the story of Lazarus from the Gospel of John, understood as an anticipation of the Resurrection. Death is imagined as peaceful now that the shroud indicates that Jesus is risen. The gentle music of muted strings and recorders over a bass with a pedal-like calm pulse is reminiscent of a cradle song. Gardiner compares it to a bourrée and points out that recorders were also used in Bach's Actus tragicus funeral music. Rathey notes that the mood again connects to the end of the St John Passion, "Ruht wohl, ihr heiligen Gebeine".

==== 8 ====
The third recitative is a dialogue of a man and a woman in the secular work. In the Easter music, the two women express their burning desire to see Jesus again, "Indessen seufzen wir" (Meanwhile we sigh). They sing in parallel lines or imitation. The motif of burning hearts is taken from the Road to Emmaus narrative.

==== 9 ====
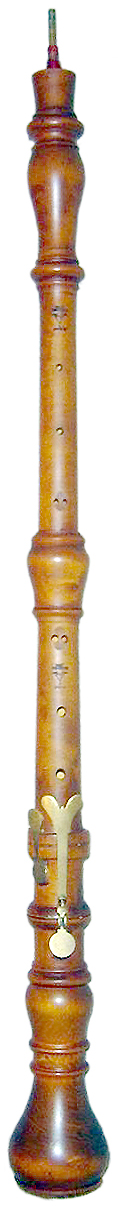
Baroque oboe d'amore

The alto (Mary Magdalene) expresses in the aria "Saget, saget mir geschwinde, saget, wo ich Jesum finde" (Tell me, tell me quickly, say where I can find Jesus), her desire to find Jesus. The expression and phrasing allude to mystic language in the Song of Songs, namely 3:1–4. The scene narrated in the Gospel of John of Mary Magdalene searching for Jesus in the garden remains in the background. The aria has been described as a thrilling expression of unbridled longing for personal community with Jesus.

In the secular model, "Komm doch, Flora, komm geschwinde" (Come, Flora, come quickly), Flora is called to bless the fields so that the peasants can pay their duties to the dedicatee of the music, Christian, Duke of Saxe-Weissenfels. The voice is accompanied by oboe and strings in the cantata version, but Bach replaced the oboe by an oboe d'amore in the 1738 oratorio. The piece opens with a concertante ritornello; the voice picks up the oboe's theme, while the oboe accompanies.

In the middle section of the aria, the woman says that without her beloved, she is "ganz verwaiset und betrübt" (completely orphaned and desolate). This passage is, deviating from the secular model, set as an Adagio. The words and emotions are close to those of the opening of Part Two of the St Matthew Passion. Gardiner, who compares the music to a gavotte, saw the Adagio phrase as "almost a blueprint of a Mozartian tragedienne's grief".

==== 10 ====
In the last recitative, "Wir sind erfreut, daß unser Jesus wieder lebt" (We are delighted that our Jesus lives again), the bass (John) expresses joy that Jesus lives again; he calls for songs of joy. The vocal line for "Wir sind erfreut" recalls the trumpet fanfares from the first movement.

==== 11 ====
In the final movement the choir offers praise and thanks, "Preis und Dank bleibe, Herr, dein Lobgesang" (Praise and thanks remain, Lord, your hymn of praise). In the secular work, the conclusion was a congratulation, beginning with "Glück und Heil bleibe dein beständig Teil!" (May Fortune and health remain your constant portion!). The movement is structured in two contrasting sections, resembling the Sanctus composed for Christmas 1724 and later made part of the Mass in B minor; both pieces feature in a first section dotted rhythm in common time and mostly chordal vocal parts.

The trumpets begin with a fanfare which the voices imitate with a marked "Glück und Heil" in the secular work and "Preis und Dank" for Easter. In both texts follows "bleibe", and the "remaining" is expressed in melismas. The following section, without the trumpets, is in B minor, for the text of victory over hell and the devil.

Picander had closed his secular poetry with a dactyl. The corresponding Easter text is "Eröffnet, ihr Himmel, die prächtigen Bogen, der Löwe von Juda kommt siegend gezogen! (Open, O heavens, your magnificent drawbridges, the Lion of Judah approaches in triumph!), alluding to an image from Revelation 5:5. Rathey notes that the same imagery had also been used in the middle section of the aria "Es ist vollbracht", in the St John Passion, immediately after the death of Jesus.

For this passage Bach returned to the metre and fanfare motifs of the opening Sinfonia, which Gardiner compares to a gigue. The work ends with a short fugato, "crowned" by the trumpets.

== Reception ==
Bach scholars, beginning with his biographer Philipp Spitta, were critical of the Easter Oratorio because of its libretto and its character as a musical drama. Spitta, unaware of its basis in secular musical theatre, wrote in 1880: "It cannot but surprise us to find that Bach could have been satisfied with such a text", followed by a detailed critical rendition of the libretto.

Around 1940, Friedrich Smend discovered the relation of the oratorio and what was known then as Schäfergespräch (Shepherds' colloquy) by Picander. It created even more criticism because of a prejudice against parody music: dealing with an important feast of the church without Gospel narrative and chorales was regarded as inadequate, and the new wording assumed to be an "intermediate text prepared with nonchalance and without sympathy". Dürr's 1971 analysis still showed a critical view, but acknowledged the work as in the tradition of Easter plays.

More recent studies saw that the oratorio, by disconnecting the music from individual characters, supports the inclusion of the listener. As Schulze pointed out, the first words "Kommt, eilet und laufet" are no longer historic narration but an "appeal to meditatio" which he compared to the opening of the St Matthew Passion, "Kommt, ihr Töchter, helft mir klagen" (Come, you daughters, help me lament). Wolff, who called the three oratorios a trilogy, summarises: "Bach managed to alter markedly the oratorio by skillfully transforming it from theatrical into devotional music". Rathey sees the oratorio as a sequel to the St John Passion, "continuing the dramatic narrative but also its theological and musical interpretation".

== Manuscripts and publication ==
The oldest sources of the Easter Cantata are 14 manuscript parts, probably from the secular cantata, which were used for the performance for Easter 1725, probably with the score of the secular work with added lines of text.

The autograph score of the Easter Oratorio from 1738 is extant. It features unusually detailed markings for articulation and dynamics; the editor Ulrich Leisinger called it one of Bach's most beautiful scores. Bach wrote the vocal parts again in 1743. The only part for a third trumpet dates from the last performance in 1749, although it was present in the 1738 score.

The Easter Oratorio was published in 1874 by the Bach-Gesellschaft in the Bach-Gesellschaft Ausgabe (BGA), the first edition of Bach's works. Diethard Hellmann published an edition in 1962. The final form of the oratorio was published in the Neue Bach-Ausgabe in 1977, edited by Paul Brainard; a critical report followed in 1981. Carus-Verlag published in 2003, as part of Stuttgarter Bach-Ausgaben, the 1738 manuscript with variants, edited by Leisinger.

== Recordings ==
A list of recordings is provided on the Bach Cantatas website. Choirs with one voice per part (OVPP) and ensembles playing period instruments in historically informed performances are shown with a green background. Michael Wersin compared several recordings in 2014.

Recordings of Easter Oratorio
Title	Conductor / Choir / Orchestra	Soloists	Label	Year	Choir type	Orch. type
J. S. Bach: Oster-Oratorium BWV 249	Marcel Couraud L'ensemble vocal et instrumental de Stuttgart	Friederike Sailer; Margarethe Bence; Fritz Wunderlich; August Messthaler	Erato	1956		
Oratorio de Pâques	Fritz Werner Heinrich-Schütz-Chor Heilbronn Pforzheim Chamber Orchestra	Edith Selig; Claudia Hellmann; Helmut Krebs; Jakob Stämpfli	Erato	1964		
Osteroratorium BWV 249	Wolfgang Gönnenwein Süddeutscher Madrigalchor Süddeutsches Kammerorchester	Teresa Żylis-Gara; Patricia Johnson; Theo Altmeyer; Dietrich Fischer-Dieskau	HMV	1965		
J. S. Bach: Easter Oratorio; Cantata BWV 10	Karl Münchinger Wiener Akademiechor Stuttgarter Kammerorchester	Elly Ameling; Helen Watts; Werner Krenn; Tom Krause	Decca	1968		
Die Bach Kantate Vol. 11	Helmuth Rilling Gächinger Kantorei Bach-Collegium Stuttgart	Arleen Augér; Julia Hamari; Adalbert Kraus; Philippe Huttenlocher	Hänssler	1981		
J. S. Bach: Cantatas BWV 11 "Ascension" · "Himmelfahrts-Oratoriun"; BWV 249 Easter" · "Pâques" · "Oster-Oratorium"	Gustav Leonhardt Orchestra & Choir of the Age of Enlightenment	Monika Frimmer; Ralf Popken; Christoph Prégardien; David Wilson-Johnson	Philips	1993		Period
J. S. Bach: Christ lag in Todes Banden; Oster-Oratorium · Easter Oratorio (BWV 4, 249)	Andrew Parrott Taverner Consort and Players	Emily Van Evera; Caroline Trevor; Charles Daniels; Peter Kooy	Virgin Classics	1993	OVPP	Period
J. S. Bach - Easter Oratorio BWV 249; Cantata BWV 66 "Erfreut euch, ihr Herzen	Philippe Herreweghe Collegium Vocale Gent	Barbara Schlick; Kai Wessel; James Taylor; Peter Kooy	Harmonia Mundi	1994		Period
Oster-Oratorium BWV 249	Philippe Herreweghe Collegium Vocale Gent	Agnès Mellon; Andreas Scholl; Mark Padmore; Peter Kooy	Brilliant Classics	1994		Period
Easter Oratorio	Ton Koopman Amsterdam Baroque Orchestra & Choir	Lisa Larsson; Elisabeth von Magnus; Gerd Türk; Klaus Mertens	Erato	1998		Period
J. S. Bach: Magnificat · Easter Oratorio	Paul McCreesh Gabrieli Consort	Kimberly McCord; Robin Blaze; Paul Agnew; Neal Davies	Archiv Produktion	2001	OVPP	Period
J.S. Bach: Easter Oratorio · Ascension Oratorio	Masaaki Suzuki Bach Collegium Japan	Yukari Nonoshita; Patrick Van Goethem; Jan Kobow; Chiyuki Urano	BIS	2004		Period
J. S. Bach: Cantatas for the Complete Liturgical Year Vol. 13: "Oster-Oratorium" (Cantatas BWV 249, 6)	Sigiswald Kuijken La Petite Bande	Yeree Suh; Petra Noskaiová; Christoph Genz; Jan van der Crabben	Archiv Produktion	2009	OVPP	Period
J. S. Bach: Easter Oratorio, BWV 249	Frans Brüggen Cappella Amsterdam Orchestra of the Eighteenth Century	Ilse Eerens; Michael Chance; Markus Schäfer; David Wilson-Johnson	Glossa	2011		Period
Bach: Easter Oratorio; Actus Tragicus	John Eliot Gardiner Monteverdi Choir English Baroque Soloists	Hannah Morrison; Margaret Bragle; Nicholas Mulroy; Peter Harvey	Soli Deo Gloria	2013		Period
J. S. Bach: Osteroratorium · C. P. E. Bach: Danket dem Herrn / Heilig	Frieder Bernius Kammerchor Stuttgart Barockorchester Stuttgart	Joanne Lunn; Elisabeth Jansson; Jan Kobow; Gotthold Schwarz	Carus	2014		Period
J.S. Bach: Easter Oratorio - Magnificat	Nicholas McGegan Cantata Collective	Nola Richardson; Aryeh Nussbaum Cohen; Thomas Cooley; Harrison Hintzsche	Avie	2025		Period
