= Dantes Diwiak =

German opera singer

- Born: Slovenia
- Education: Musikhochschule Hamburg
- Occupation: Classical tenor
- Organizations: NDR Chor; Tanto Canto

Dantes Diwiak (born in Slovenia) is a classical tenor, who grew up and has worked mostly in Germany.

== Career ==
Dantes Diwiak studied singing with Klaus Kirchner and opera at the Musikhochschule Hannover with Theo Altmeyer. He took master classes with Hermann Reutter, Birgit Nilsson, Helmuth Rilling and Scot Weir. He was a member of the Staatsoper Hannover and the opera houses of Bremen and Oldenburg.

Diwiak sang the part of the Evangelist in Bach's Passions also in Moscow, France, Syria and Israel, among others. He has collaborated with the choir MarkusChor Hannover and the Staatsorchester in concerts and services. In 1982, he performed with them the Oratorio de Noël of Camille Saint-Saëns, in 1983 he participated in Rossinis Petite messe solennelle as part of the Kirchentag, also in Weber's Missa sancta No. 1 in E flat major. In 1989, he sang in Haydn's Die Schöpfung with the Harburger Kantorei in the St. Johanniskirche in Harburg, Hamburg. In the Neustädter Kirche, Hannover, he sang in choral concerts, in 1986 Stravinsky's Canticum sacrum, in 1988 Stravinsky's Cantata and Mozart's Great Mass in C minor, in 1990 Bach's Mass in B minor, in 1991 he was the Evangelist in the St Matthew Passion in the last concert conducted by Erhard Egidi, together with Anselm Richter, Monika Frimmer, Ralf Popken and Joachim Gebhardt. In 1994, a concert of the Mass in B minor in the Peterskirche in Heidelberg was recorded. Gerald Kegelmann conducted the Heidelberger Madrigalchor, the Accademia Filarmonica Köln and the Trumpet Consort Friedemann Immer, Veronika Winter, Kai Wessel and Raimund Nolte.

In 2007, Diwiak performed with the MarkusChor Hannover Haydn's Paukenmesse, Mozart's Krönungsmesse and Mendelssohn's Elias. With the choir Nordschleswigsche Musikvereinigung he performed among others in 2009 Haydn's Missa in angustiis and Bach's cantata Erschallet, ihr Lieder, erklinget, ihr Saiten! BWV 172.

In 2002, Diwiak founded together with Monika Frimmer, Christa Bonhoff and Peter Kooy a quartet Tanto Canto to sing rarely performed music a cappella, with piano or with ensemble. The quartet recorded in 2005 excerpts from the collections Augsburger Tafel-Confect (short for: Ohren-vergnügendes und Gemüth-ergötzendes Tafel-Confect, in English: Augsburg Table Confectionery, Pleasuring the Ears and Delightful to the Soul) of the composers Valentin Rathgeber and Johann Caspar Seyfert. In 2010, he appeared in a concert of the Universität Hamburg in the oratorio Die Glocke of Max Bruch. In November 2010, he was the tenor soloist in Verdi's Messa da Requiem in St. Martin, Idstein.

Dantes Diwiak is married to the contralto Christa Bonhoff.
