= Monika Frimmer =

German soprano in opera and concert (1957–2022)

- Monika Frimmer, c. 1990
- Born: 16 August 1957; Marburg, Hesse, Germany
- Died: 26 December 2022 (aged 65); Schwarmstedt, Lower Saxony, Germany
- Education: Hochschule für Musik und Theater Hannover
- Occupation: Classical soprano
- Organization: Staatsoper Hannover

Monika Frimmer (16 August 1957 – 26 December 2022) was a German soprano in opera and concert.

== Career ==
Monika Frimmer studied at the Hochschule für Musik und Theater Hannover in Hannover. She studied further in master-classes and worked with Birgit Nilsson, Elisabeth Schwarzkopf and Jörg Demus. In 1980 she was a winner in the national competition Bundeswettbewerb Gesang Berlin.

She was a member of the ensemble of the Staatsoper Hannover as a lyric soprano from 1980 to 1993. In 1982 she appeared as Anima in a scenic production of Cavalieri's Rappresentatione di Anima, et di Corpo in the Marktkirche, conducted by Hans-Martin Linde. She sang the role of Najade in Ariadne auf Naxos by Richard Strauss. In the opera Ermann Wolf-Ferrari's Sly, revived by the Staatsoper Hannover, she appeared as Rosalina. From 1993 she worked as a free-lance singer in opera, oratorio and Lied.

In 1987, Frimmer sang in a recording of Buxtehude's Membra Jesu nostri, conducted by Ton Koopman, with Barbara Schlick, Michael Chance, Christoph Prégardien, Peter Kooy, the Knabenchor Hannover and the Amsterdam Baroque Orchestra. In the Neustädter Kirche, Hannover, she sang in choral concerts, in 1996 Ein deutsches Requiem, and in 1988 Stravinsky's Cantata and Mozart's Great Mass in C minor. In 1991, she performed there Bach's St Matthew Passion in the last concert conducted by Erhard Egidi, together with Dantes Diwiak, Anselm Richter, Ralf Popken and Joachim Gebhardt. In 1998, she recorded the St Matthew Passion with the Thomanerchor and the Gewandhausorchester Leipzig, conducted by Georg Christoph Biller. She was a soprano soloist in the cycles of Bach cantatas of both Gustav Leonhardt and Masaaki Suzuki. With Leonhardt she also recorded Bach's Easter Oratorio and Ascension Oratorio, and with Suzuki Bach's Christmas Oratorio.

In 2002, she founded together with Christa Bonhoff, Diwiak and Peter Kooy a quartet Tanto Canto to sing rarely performed music a cappella, with piano or with ensemble. The quartet recorded in 2005 excerpts from the collections Augsburger Tafel-Confect (short for: Ohren-vergnügendes und Gemüth-ergötzendes Tafel-Confect, in English: Augsburg Table Confectionery, Pleasuring the Ears and Delightful to the Soul) of the composers Valentin Rathgeber and Johann Caspar Seyfert. She collaborated regularly with the Trio di Clarone and the Ensemble Incanto. Her piano accompanist for Lieder was Liese Klahn.

Frimmer died in Schwarmstedt on 26 December 2022, at the age of 65.
