= Entfliehet, verschwindet, entweichet, ihr Sorgen, BWV 249a =

1725 Bach cantata

Entfliehet, verschwindet, entweichet, ihr Sorgen
- BWV 249a
- Congratulatory cantata by J. S. Bach
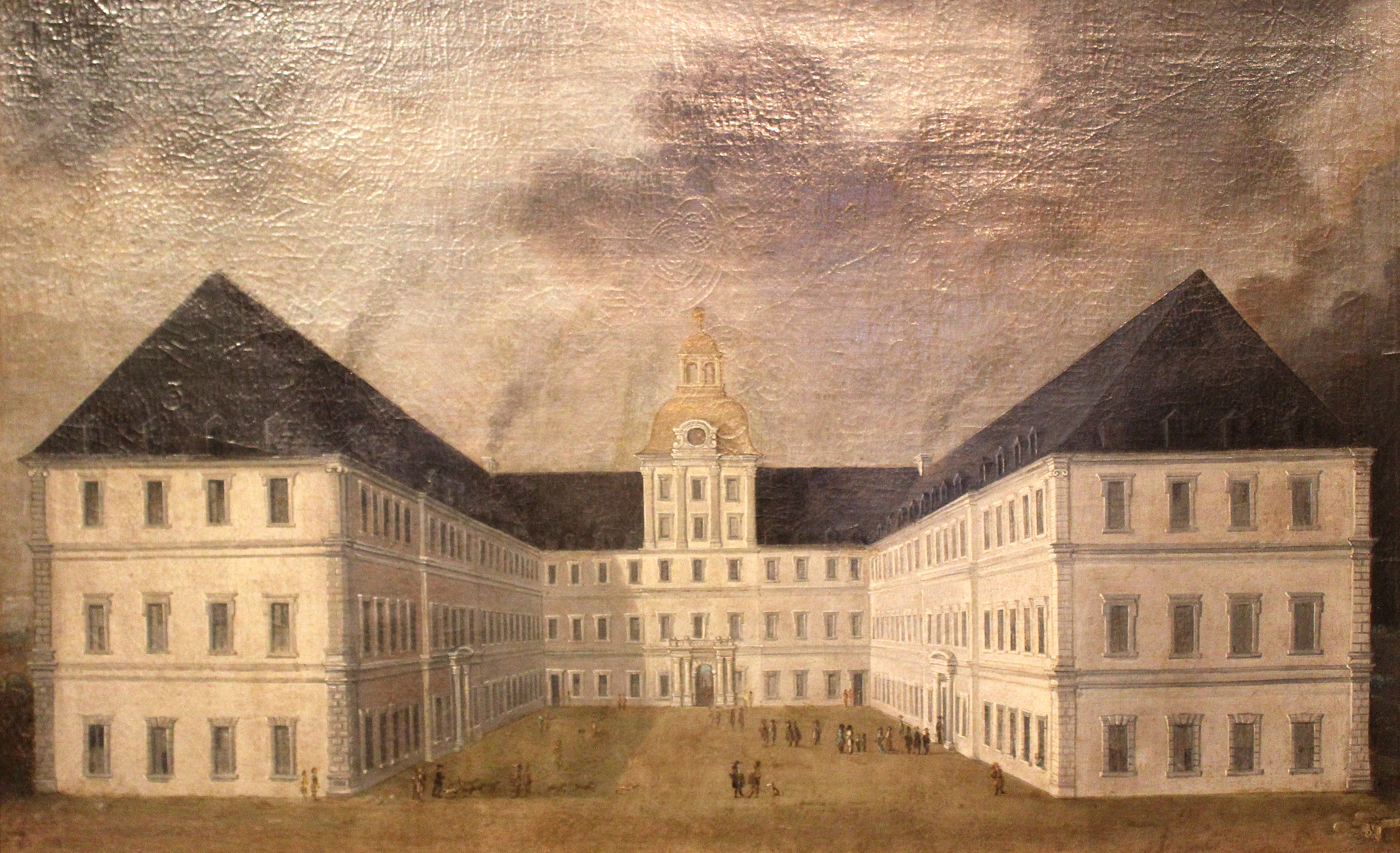
- Schloss Neu-Augustusburg. historical painting of the palace where the cantata was first performed
- Related: Easter Oratorio
- Occasion: birthday of Christian, Duke of Saxe-Weissenfels
- Text: by Picander
- Performed: 23 February 1725: Weißenfels
- Movements: 10
- Vocal: SATB choir and solo
- Instrumental: 3 trumpets; timpani; 2 oboes; bassoon; 2 recorders; transverse flute; 2 violins; viola; continuo

Entfliehet, verschwindet, entweichet, ihr Sorgen (Flee, dissolve, fade away, you cares), BWV 249a, (Note: "BWV" is Bach-Werke-Verzeichnis, a thematic catalogue of Bach's works.) later BWV 249.1, is a secular cantata by Johann Sebastian Bach. It was composed for the birthday of Christian, Duke of Saxe-Weissenfels and performed on 23 February 1725. The work is also known as Shepherd Cantata or Shepherds' Cantata (German: Schäferkantate). It was titled Tafel-Music in the publication of the libretto, by Picander, in 1727, suggesting a scenic performance. The score is lost, but could be reconstructed, because Bach used it again in his Easter Oratorio. The work in ten movements is scored for four vocal soloists representing shepherds, a four-part choir and a festive Baroque instrumental ensemble of three trumpets, timpani, two oboes, oboe d'amore, bassoon, two recorders, transverse flute, strings and continuo.

== History ==
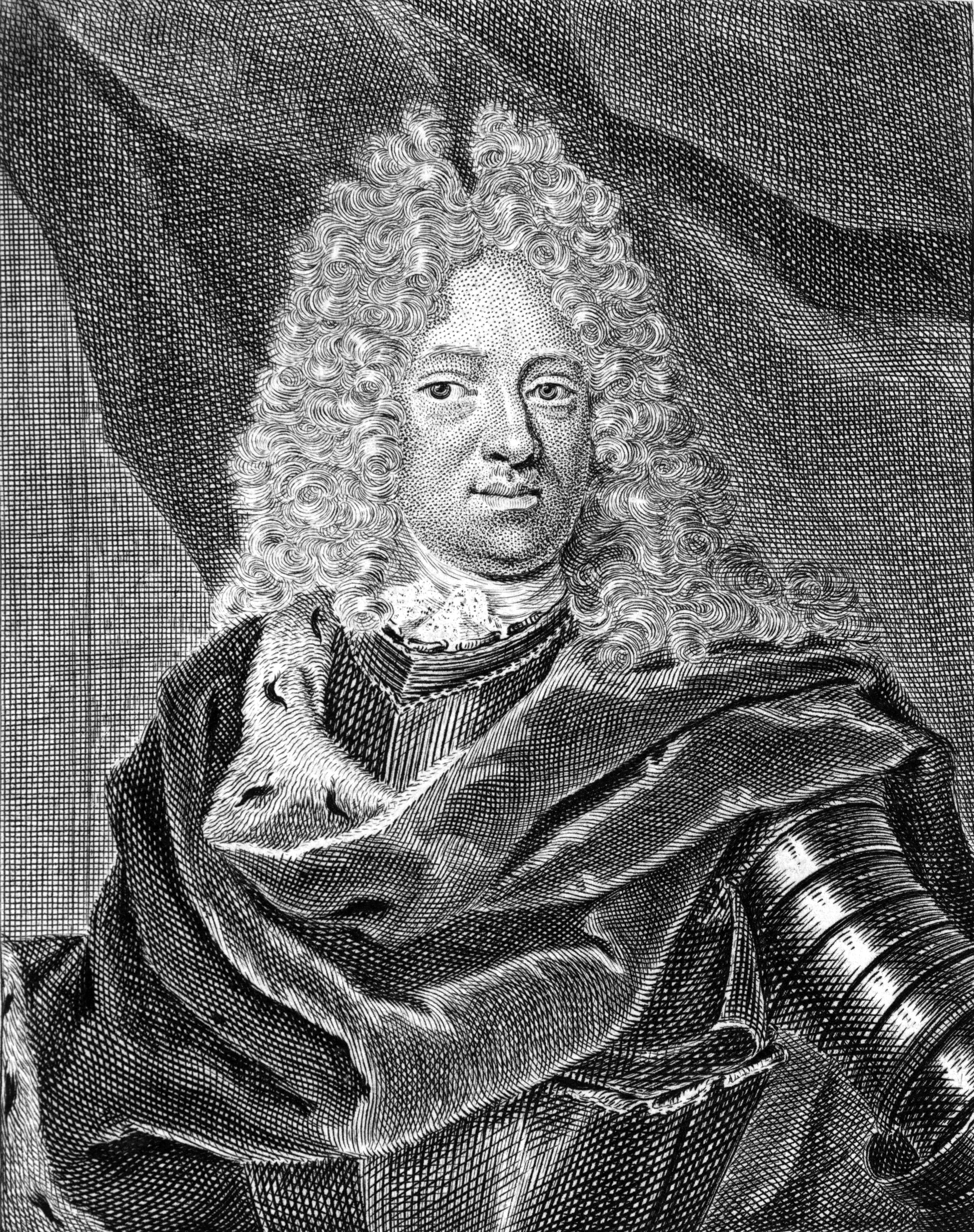
Christian, Duke of Saxe-Weissenfels

Bach composed Entfliehet, verschwindet, entweichet, ihr Sorgen in 1725 for the 43rd birthday of his patron, Christian, Duke of Saxe-Weissenfels, after having written Was mir behagt, ist nur die muntre Jagd, BWV 208, for his 31st birthday. It was first performed at Schloss Neu-Augustusburg on 23 February 1725.

In 1725 Bach was working as the Thomaskantor in Leipzig. The text was written by Picander, a librettist he met there; it is their first documented collaboration. The work, as the earlier cantata, is festively scored, the characters are mythological figures, and the libretto is influenced by the contemporary shepherds' poetry which was popular at courts. Picander published the piece in 1727 as Tafel-Music, suggesting that it was to be performed as theatre in shepherd costumes during a meal.

While the text survived, the music is lost. It can be reconstructed, because Bach used it again, in a cantata for Easter Sunday first performed the same year, and performed again several times, always polishing details. The version performed in 1738 was named Easter Oratorio. It seems likely that Bach had planned to use the music for both purposes from the start.

The German Bach scholar Friedrich Smend determined that the order of movements was not changed in the derived work, and that therefore the music of the Shepherd Cantata could be reconstructed. Addition of the missing recitatives has been tried by musicologist Hermann Keller and by Alexander Grychtolik. It is not known if the two instrumental movements opening the oratorio were already part of the cantata.

== Plot, scoring and structure ==
The shepherds Damoetas (bass) and Menalcas (tenor) chase away their sorrows to deliver with the shepherdesses Doris (soprano) and Sylvia (alto) their birthday wishes to the Duke of Saxe-Weissenfels. The orchestra is festively scored for three trumpets, timpani, two oboes, bassoon, two recorders, transverse flute, two violins, viola, and basso continuo.

The music is structured in ten movements:

1. Sinfonia: Allegro – Adagio
2. Aria à duetto (tenor, bass; da capo: soprano, alto): Entfliehet, verschwindet, entweichet, ihr Sorgen
3. Recitative (soprano, alto, tenor, bass): Was hör ich da? Wer unterbricht uns hier
4. Aria (soprano): Hundertausend Schmeicheleien
5. Recitative (soprano, alto, tenor, bass): Wie aber, schönste Schäferin
6. Aria (tenor): Wieget euch, ihr satten Schafe
7. Recitative (alto, bass): Wohlan! Geliebte Schäferinnen
8. Aria (alto): Komm doch, Flora, komm geschwinde
9. Recitative (bass): Was sorgt ihr viel, die Flora zu beschweren
10. Aria à Quartetto (soprano, alto, tenor, bass): Glück und Heil bleibe dein beständig Teil

== Music ==
The tenor aria is accompanied by muted violins doubled by recorders, suggesting a lullaby as well as pastoral music.

== Recordings ==
The recordings are taken from the listing on the Bach Cantatas website.

- J.S. Bach: Schäferkantate BWV 249a · Doppelkonzert nach BWV 1060, Edith Mathis, Hetty Plümacher, Theo Altmeyer, Jakob Stämpfli, Gächinger Kantorei & Figuralchor der Gedächtniskirche Stuttgart, Bach-Collegium Stuttgart, cond. Helmuth Rilling. The reconstruction used was by Hermann Keller.

This 1967 recording on the West German Cantate-Musicaphon label was also released in the USA by Nonesuch Records. (H 71243 "Shepherd Cantata," BWV 249a)
Musicaphon rereleased it in the 1990s.

- Celebration Cantatas BWV 205a & 249a – Entfliehet, ihr Sorgen, Miriam Feuersinger, Elvira Bill, Daniel Johannsen, Stephan MacLeod, Deutsche Hofmusik, cond. Alexander Grychtolik. The reconstruction used was by Alexander Grychtolik. This 2019 release was on Deutsche Harmondi Mundi catalogue number 9075936392.

== Notes and references ==
Notes

=== Cited sources ===
- "Entfliehet, verschwindet, entweichet ihr Sorgen BWV 249.1; BWV 249a; BC [G 2]". Bach Digital. 2025.
- Dellal, Pamela (2025). "BWV 249a – Entfliehet, verschwindet, entweichet ihr Sorgen". Emmanuel Music.
- Dürr, Alfred; Jones, Richard D. P. (2006). "Kommt, eilet und laufet, Easter Oratorio BWV 249". The Cantatas of J. S. Bach: With Their Librettos in German-English Parallel Text. Oxford: Oxford University Press. pp. 271–274. ISBN 978-0-19-969628-4.
- Leisinger, Ulrich (2003). Oratorium / Osteroratorim / Oratorium festi paschali / BWV 249 (PDF). Carus-Verlag. pp. VI–VII.
- Grychtolik, Alexander (2019). "Johann Sebastian Bach (1685–1750) / Entfliehet, entschwindet, entweichet, ihr Sorgen". Ortus Musikverlag.
- Oron, Aryeh (2024). "Cantata BWV 249a Entfliehet, verschwindet, entweichet ihr Sorgen". Bach Cantatas website.
- Wolf, Uwe (4 May 2021). ""Hochfürstl. Sächsisch-Weißenfelsischer würklicher Capellmeister"". Carus-Verlag.
- "Entfliehet, ihr Sorgen – Bach celebration cantatas BWV 205a & 249a". Funk-Stiftung.
