= Christa Bonhoff =

German opera singer

- Born: Westphalia
- Other names: Christa Diwiak
- Education: Musikhochschule Hamburg
- Occupation: Classical contralto
- Organizations: NDR Chor; Tanto Canto

Christa Bonhoff is a German contralto and mezzo-soprano singer.

== Early life ==
Bonhoff was born in Westphalia.

== Education ==
Bonhoff studied singing at the Hochschule für Musik Hamburg with Annie Schoonus.

== Career ==
Already as a student she joined the choir NDR Chor and worked as a guest for the Hamburgische Staatsoper. She has concentrated on singing in oratorios.

She was the soloist in recordings of Bach's Christmas Oratorio (2002) and St John Passion (2006) with the conductor Michaela Prentl, the SebastianChor, Hubert Nettinger as the Evangelist, Gerlinde Sämann, Thomas Hamberger and Tim Hennis.

In 2002, she founded together with Monika Frimmer, Dantes Diwiak and Peter Kooy a quartet Tanto Canto to sing rarely performed music a cappella, with piano or with ensemble. The quartet recorded in 2005 excerpts from the collections Augsburger Tafel-Confect (short for: Ohren-vergnügendes und Gemüth-ergötzendes Tafel-Confect, in English: Augsburg Table Confectionery, Pleasuring the Ears and Delightful to the Soul) of the composers Valentin Rathgeber and Johann Caspar Seyfert.

Bonhoff recorded psalm settings and other sacred music in Latin of Johann Adolph Hasse. In 2004 she recorded sacred music of Charles Gounod with the chamber choir I Vocalisti, conducted by Hans-Joachim Lustig. In 2005 she performed in St. Petri, Cuxhaven, in Honegger's oratorio Le Roi David. In 2007 she performed in Rossini's Petite messe solennelle, conducted by Matthias Zangerle. She has collaborated with the choir Nordschleswigsche Musikvereinigung, in 2008 in Francesco Durante's Magnificat, Vivaldi's Confitebor and Rossini's early Messa di Rimini (1809), in 2009 in Haydn's Missa in angustiis and Bach's cantata Erschallet, ihr Lieder, erklinget, ihr Saiten! BWV 172. In 2009 she performed Haydn's Paukenmesse, celebrated in a church service for the 200th anniversary of the composer's death, in St. Petri, Hamburg. In 2010 she appeared in a concert of the Universität Hamburg in the oratorio Die Glocke of Max Bruch. In November 2010 she was the mezzo-soprano soloist in Verdi's Messa da Requiem in St. Martin, Idstein.

Christa Bonhoff is married to the tenor Dantes Diwiak.
