= Peter Kooy =

Dutch bass singer (born 1954)

Peter Kooij (or, internationally Kooy, born 17 September 1954, in Soest, Netherlands) is a Dutch bass singer who specializes in baroque music.

== Biography ==
Kooij started his musical career at six years as a choir boy. However he started his musical studies as a violin student. He came back to singing, with tuition from Max van Egmond at the Sweelinck Conservatorium in Amsterdam which led in 1980 to the award of the diploma for solo performance.

His international career started in 1981 under the direction of Philippe Herreweghe, with La Chapelle Royale and the Collegium Vocale Gent, with whom he interpreted mainly Johann Sebastian Bach, and also performed Henri Dumont, Marc-Antoine Charpentier, Jean-Baptiste Lully, Heinrich Schütz and Jean Gilles. From the mid-1990s much of his career was dedicated to the recording of Bach's complete cantatas with the Bach Collegium Japan, directed by Masaaki Suzuki.

In 2002 he founded together with Monika Frimmer, Christa Bonhoff and Dantes Diwiak a quartet Tanto Canto to sing rarely performed music a cappella, with piano or with ensemble. The quartet recorded in 2005 excerpts from the collections Augsburger Tafel-Confect (short for: Ohren-vergnügendes und Gemüth-ergötzendes Tafel-Confect, in English: Augsburg Table Confectionery, Pleasuring the Ears and Delightful to the Soul) of the composers Valentin Rathgeber and Johann Caspar Seyfert.

Kooij has been teaching singing at the Royal Conservatory of The Hague since September 2005.

== Recordings ==
=== With Philippe Herreweghe ===
- 1981 : Motets pour la Chapelle du roy, Henri Dumont (Chapelle Royale)
- 1985 : Motet Pour l'Offertoire de la Messe Rouge H.434 and Miserere H.219, Marc-Antoine Charpentier (Chapelle Royale)
- 1985 : Grands Motets, Jean-Baptiste Lully (Chapelle Royale)
- 1985 : St Matthew Passion, BWV 244, Johann Sebastian Bach (Chapelle Royale, Collegium Vocale)
- 1987 : Musikalische Exequien, Heinrich Schütz (Chapelle Royale)
- 1988 : Johannes Passion, BWV 245, Johann Sebastian Bach (Collegium Vocale, Orchestre de la Chapelle Royale)
- 1988 : Requiem, Gabriel Fauré (version 1893) (Chapelle Royale, Ensemble Musique Oblique)
- 1989 : Weihnachts-Oratorium, BWV 248, Johann Sebastian Bach (Collegium Vocale)
- 1989 : Les Lamentations de Jérémie, Roland de Lassus (Ensemble Vocal Européen de la Chapelle Royale)
- 1990 : Cantata Am Abend aber desselbigen Sabbats, BWV 42, Johann Sebastian Bach (Chapelle Royale, Collegium Vocale)
- 1990 : Magnificat, BWV 243, and Cantata Ein feste Burg ist unser Gott, BWV 80, Johann Sebastian Bach (Chapelle Royale, Collegium Vocale)
- 1990 : Missae, BWV 234 & 235, Johann Sebastian Bach (Collegium Vocale)
- 1991 : Cantatas for bass, BWV 56, 82 & 128, Johann Sebastian Bach (Chapelle Royale)
- 1990 : Requiem, Jean Gilles (Chapelle Royale)
- 1991 : Missae, BWV 233 & 236, Johann Sebastian Bach (Collegium Vocale)
- 1992 : Cantatas, BWV 131, 73 et 105, Johann Sebastian Bach (Collegium Vocale)
- 1992 : Missa Viri Galilei, Palestrina (Ensemble Vocal Européen de la Chapelle Royale)
- 1993 : Cantatas, BWV 39, 93 et 107, Johann Sebastian Bach (Collegium Vocale)
- 1996 : Geistliche Chormusik, Heinrich Schütz (Collegium Vocale)

=== With Ton Koopman ===
- 1992 : Motets à double Choeur H.403, H.404, H.135, H.136, H.137, H.392, H.410, H.167 by Marc-Antoine Charpentier (The Amsterdam Baroque Orchestra). 2 CD Erato.

=== With Masaaki Suzuki ===
- 1995-2008 : Bach's complete cantatas (Bach Collegium Japan)

=== Solo recitals ===
- Mein Herz ist bereit German Solo cantatas for bass, violin and b. c. from the 17th century. - Bruhns Mein Herz ist bereit, Buxtehude, Tunder, Pachelbel, Rosenmüller, J. P. Krieger, Biber Nisi Dominus CordArte Ensemble, Pan Classics PC10211 2005
- De profundis clamavi – Weckmann, Bruhns, Geist, Buns, J. C. Bach. Armonia Sonora, Ramée 2007
- Harmonia Sacrae – Tunder An Wasserflüssen Babylon, Meder Gott hilf mir; Ach Herr, strafe mich nicht mit deinem Zorn, Christoph Weckmann Lamentatio Wie liegt die Stadt so wüste, Christoph Bernhard Sie haben meinen Herrn hinweggenommen, Buns Obstupescite Peter Kooij, Hana Blažíková, L'Armonia Sonora, dir. Mieneke van der Velden, Ramée. 2009
