= Schloss Moritzburg (Zeitz) =

Palace in Zeitz, Sachsen-Anhalt

Schloss Moritzburg, Zeitz
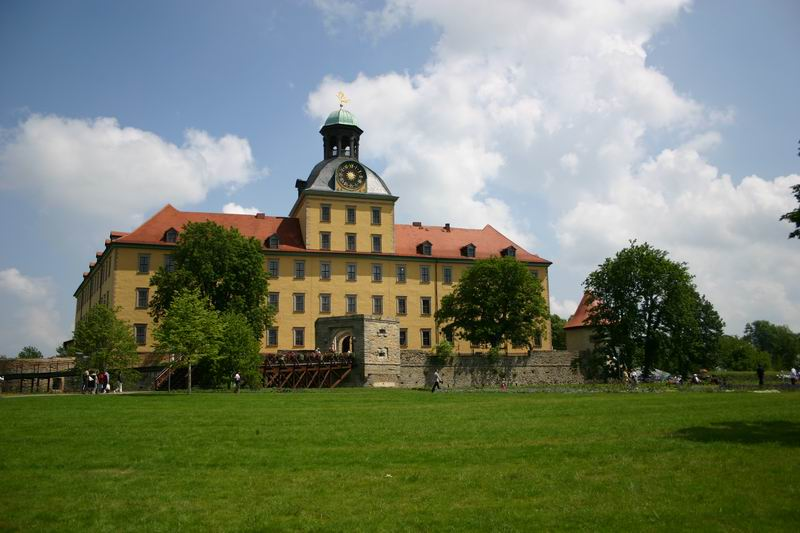
- View from the park

- Location within Saxony-Anhalt Location within Germany

General information
- Architectural style: early Baroque architecture
- Location: Zeitz, Saxony-Anhalt, Germany
- Coordinates: 51°03′08″N 12°07′35″E
- Construction started: 1657 (reconstruction)

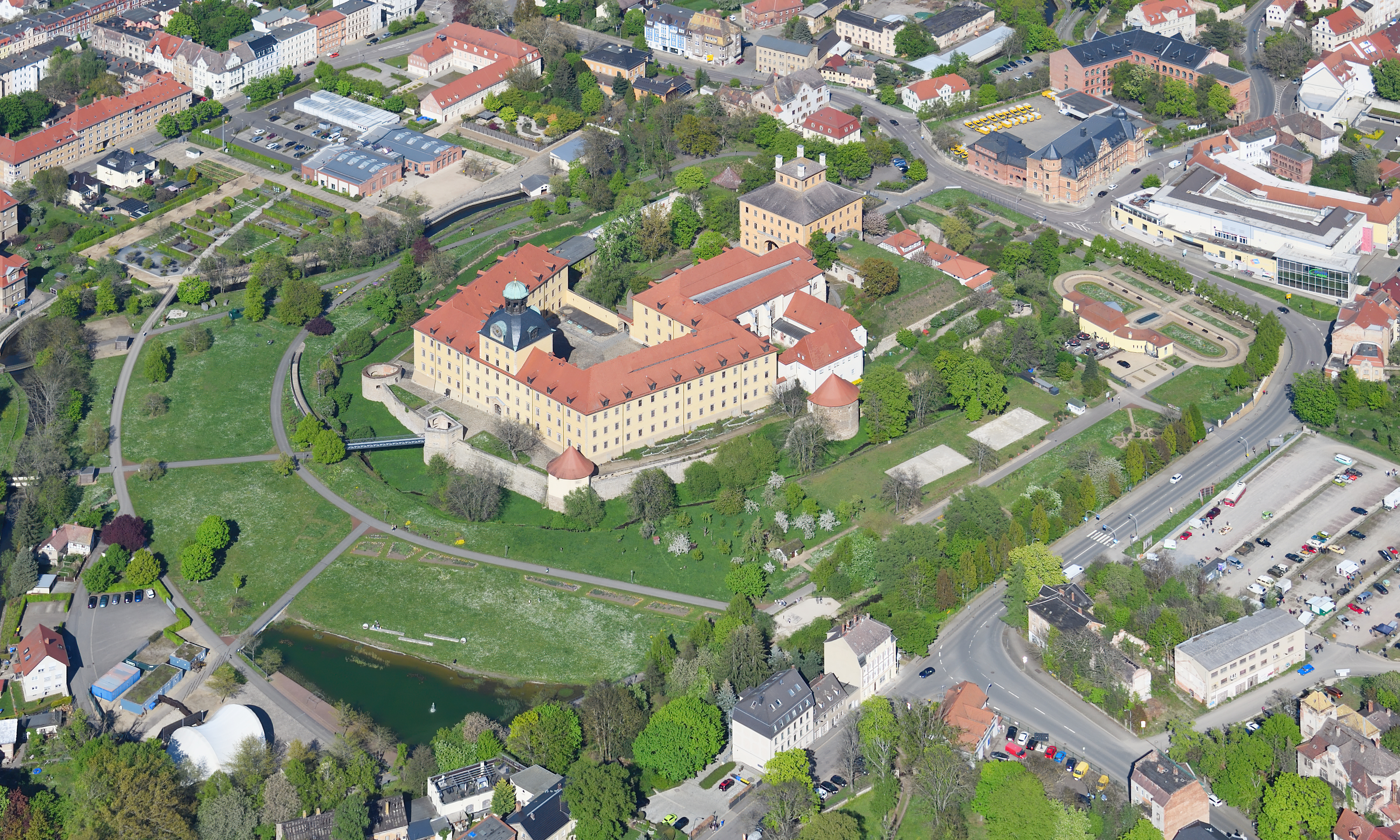
Aerial view

Schloss Moritzburg is a Schloss (palace) in Zeitz on the White Elster in the Burgenlandkreis in Saxony-Anhalt. The present baroque building dates from the 17th century. Before that, it was a royal palace and fortified seat of a bishop. The Zeitz Cathedral of St. Peter and Paul is also located on the site.

== History ==
In connection with the foundation of the Archbishopric of Magdeburg in 967 the diocese of Zeitz was founded as an auxiliary bishopric in 968 by Otto I. In 976, his son Otto II gave the already existing royal castle to the bishop. In 1028, the bishop's seat was moved to Naumburg, which is 35 kilometres (22 mi) away, and in 1285 back to Zeitz again.

In 1429, the Hussite Wars caused severe damage. In 1644, in the Thirty Years' War, the castle complex was destroyed. Plans by Johann Moritz Richter served as the basis for the reconstruction from 1657-1718. The reconstructed castle served as residence of the Dukes of Saxe-Zeitz.

== Description ==
In place of the medieval bishop's castle, a three-winged complex with a tower in the middle of the main wing was built, the cathedral was converted into a castle church with a crypt as the burial place of the ducal family, and the badly damaged Gothic castle wall was repaired and renewed. In addition, the castle was given a fortification ring according to the bastion system. Particularly impressive are the casemated redoubts on the city side, which have been preserved to this day, with the monumental gatehouse in between. The castle has pleasure gardens, riding arena, menagerie, and orangeries in the courtly area.

== Museum ==
In 1931, the collections of the Zeitzer Geschichts- und Altertumsvereins (Zeitz History and Antiquarian Society) were transferred to the castle where a museum was opened. Today, the Museum Schloss Moritzburg Zeitz presents seven permanent exhibitions, including the Deutsches Kinderwagen Museum (German Pram Museum).

== Park ==
Schloss Moritzburg is surrounded by the Zeitz Castle Park which is part of the Saxony-Anhalt Garden Dreams project.

== Gallery ==
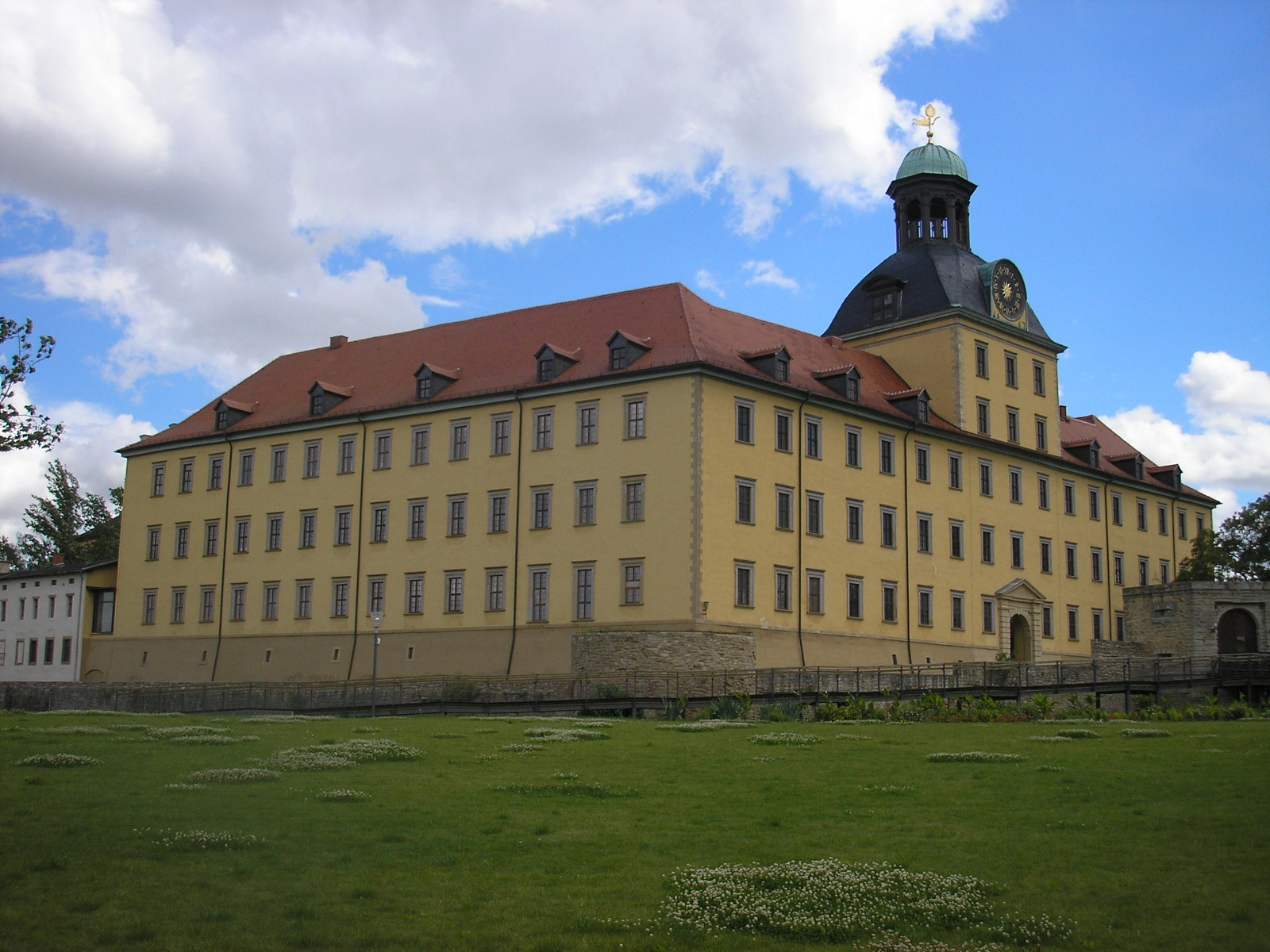
Side view

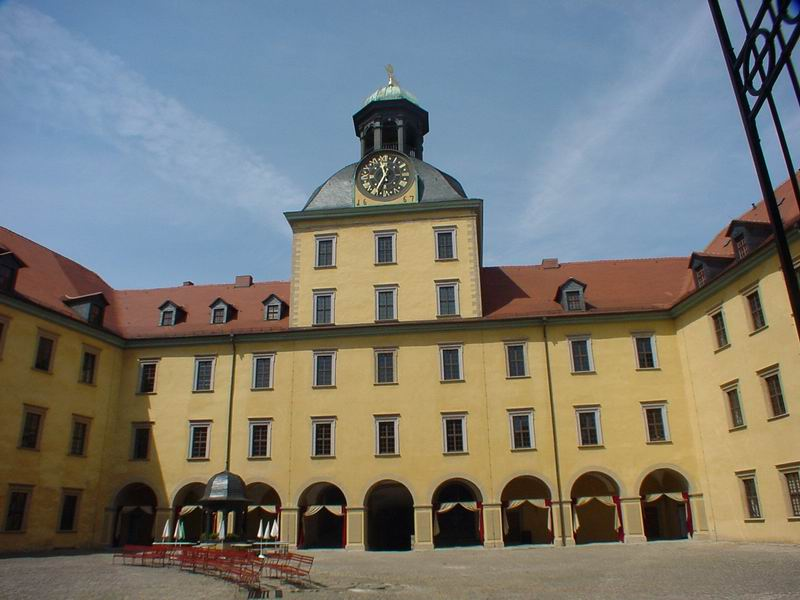
Inner courtyard

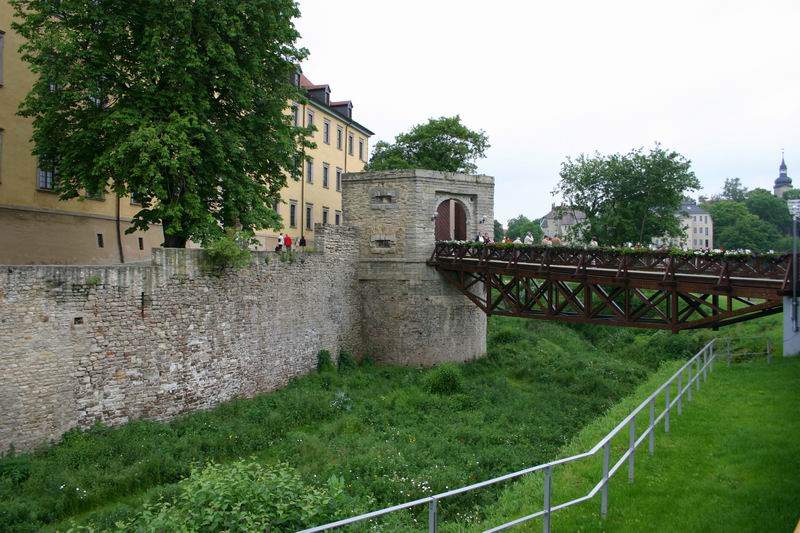
West gate

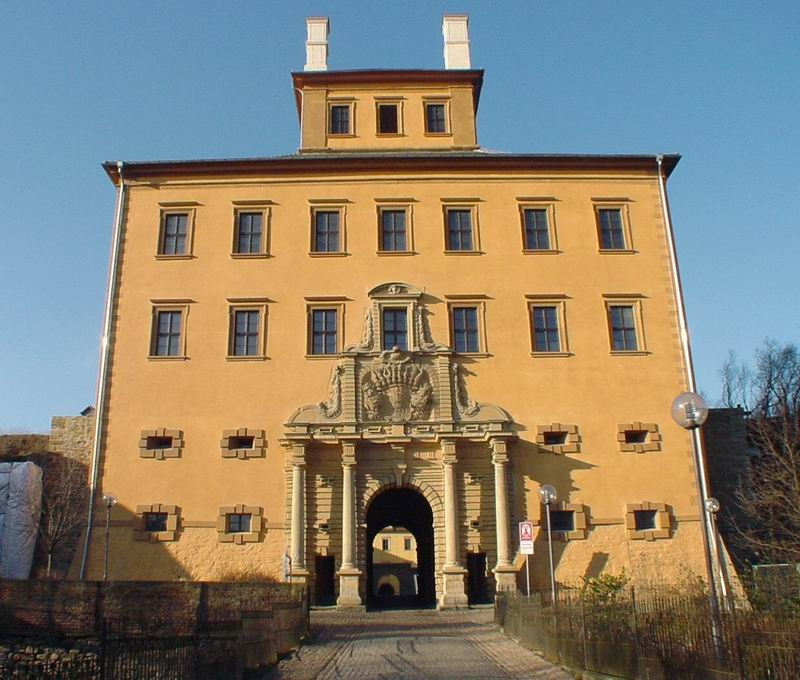
Baroque gatehouse

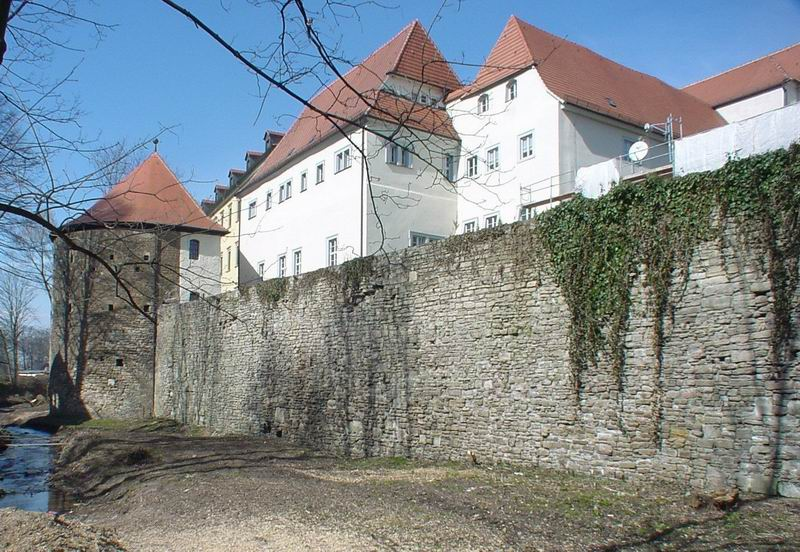
South wall
