= Saxony-Anhalt Garden Dreams =

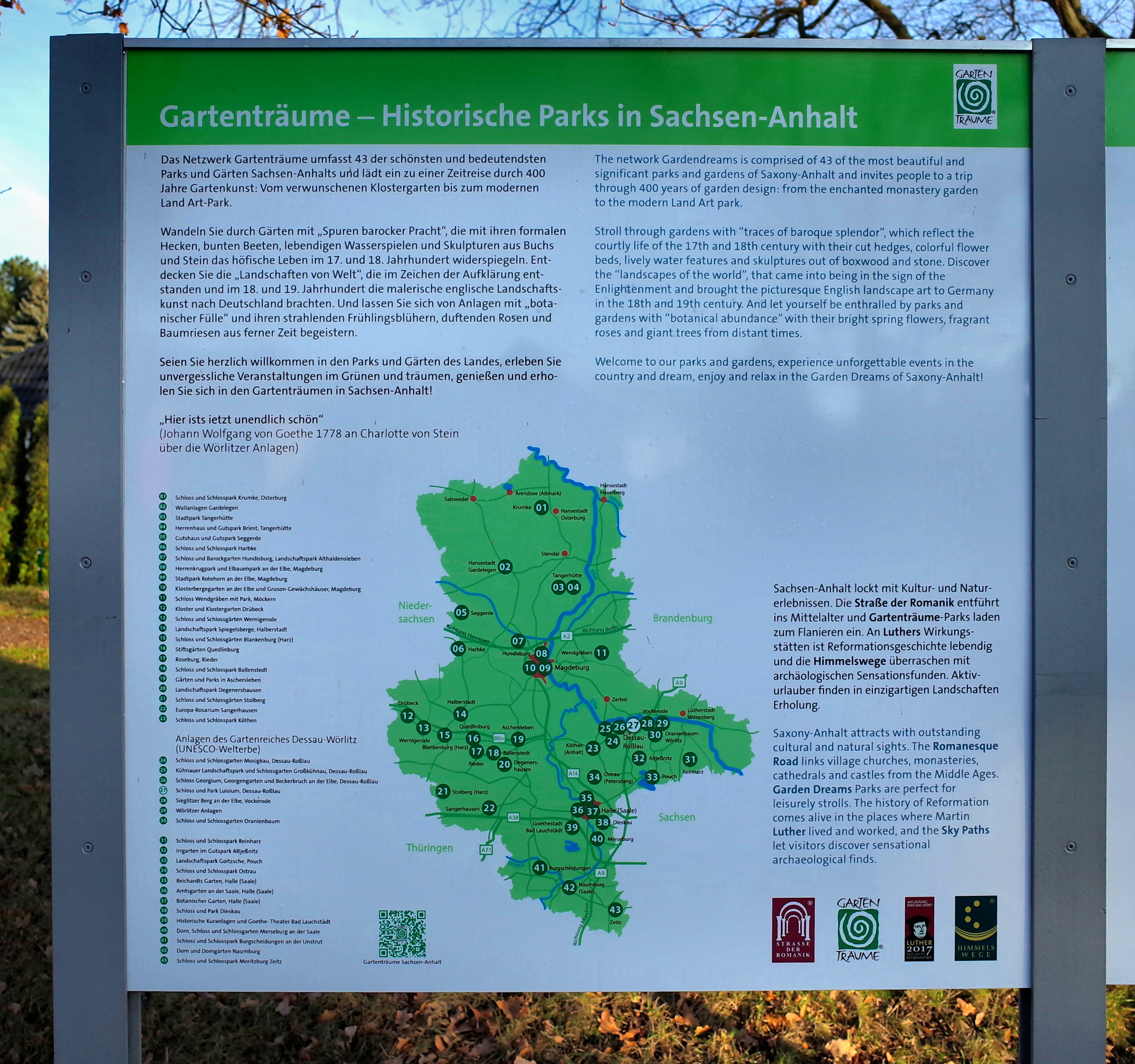

The Garden Dreams Project (German: Projekt Gartenträume) is a conservation and tourism network concerned with rediscovering the cultural heritage of gardens in the German state of Saxony-Anhalt. Historical parks which had been, to an extent, forgotten are opened up to a wide audience. The beginnings of the project date back to 1999.

Fifty parks of varying character across the state of Saxony-Anhalt belong to the network. These include the Elbaue Park in Magdeburg, the former "Accommodation of Romanticism" Reichardt's Garden in Halle (Saale), the Europa Rosarium in Sangerhausen, the maze in Altjeßnitz, the Castle and Park at Schloss Moritzburg (Zeitz) and the recent Bürgerpark in Wernigerode that includes the miniature park Little Harz.

Since the beginning of 2006, the "garden dreams" have been marketed using their own logo.

== Sources ==
- Ludwig Schumann: Besondere Parks & Gärten in Sachsen-Anhalt. Buchverlag für die Frau, Leipzig 2006; ISBN 3-89798-191-2.
