= L'Armonia Sonora =

L'Armonia Sonora is a Netherlands early music group led by the gambist Mieneke van der Velden.

The ensemble's first three releases appeared on the Ramée label were critically well received by BBC Music Magazine and Gramophone Magazine.

== Discography ==
- J. S. Bach Da Gamba - a volume of Bach gamba works, Ramée
- De Profundia - German Sacred Cantatas Vol.1 with Peter Kooij Ramée
- Harmoniae Sacrae - German Sacred Cantatas Vol.2 with Hana Blažíková and Peter Kooij Ramée
