= Johann Moritz Richter =

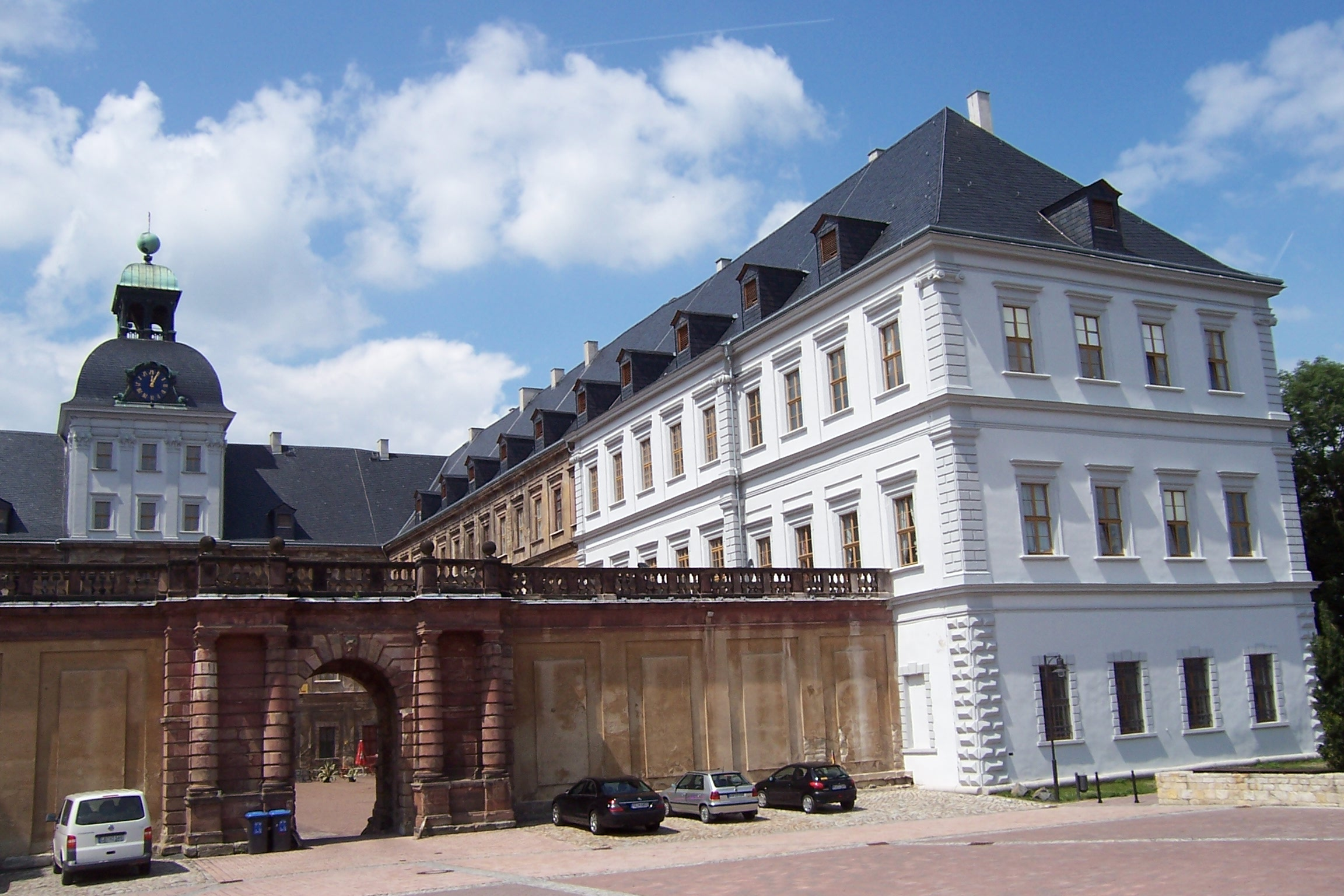
Schloss Neu-Augustusburg, from the East

Johann Moritz Richter (1620–1667) was a German architect and engraver.

Richter was born in Weimar. In the position of "fürstlich-sächsischer Landbaumeister" (court architect), he designed the oldest extant bridge in Weimar, the Sternbrücke (de), built from 1651 to 1654 crossing the Ilm river. It is part of the Park an der Ilm. He designed the Schloss in Weimar which was destroyed by fire in 1774.

Richter participated in building Schloss Moritzburg in Zeitz and Schloss Neu-Augustusburg in Weißenfels. His son continued his work on these buildings after his death. He is buried on the Jacobsfriedhof.

== Literature ==
- Frank Boblenz: Zum Umfeld des Zeitzer Schloßbaumeisters und Ingenieurs Johann Moritz Richter (1620–1667). In: Die sächsischen Wurzeln des Landes Sachsen-Anhalt und die Rolle der Sekundogenitur Sachsen-Zeitz. Halle 1997, pp. 51–72 (Beiträge zur Regional- und Landeskultur Sachsen-Anhalts. 5).
- Frank Boblenz: „in der ingenieurkunst erzogen undt ihn […] so weit bracht, das er was feines begriffen“. Zur Ausbildung und zum Werk des Weimarer Baumeisters Johann Moritz Richter (1620–1667). In: Weimarbrief. 2/2008. pp. 86–91.
