= Schloss Neu-Augustusburg =

Coordinates: 51°11′58″N 11°58′31″E

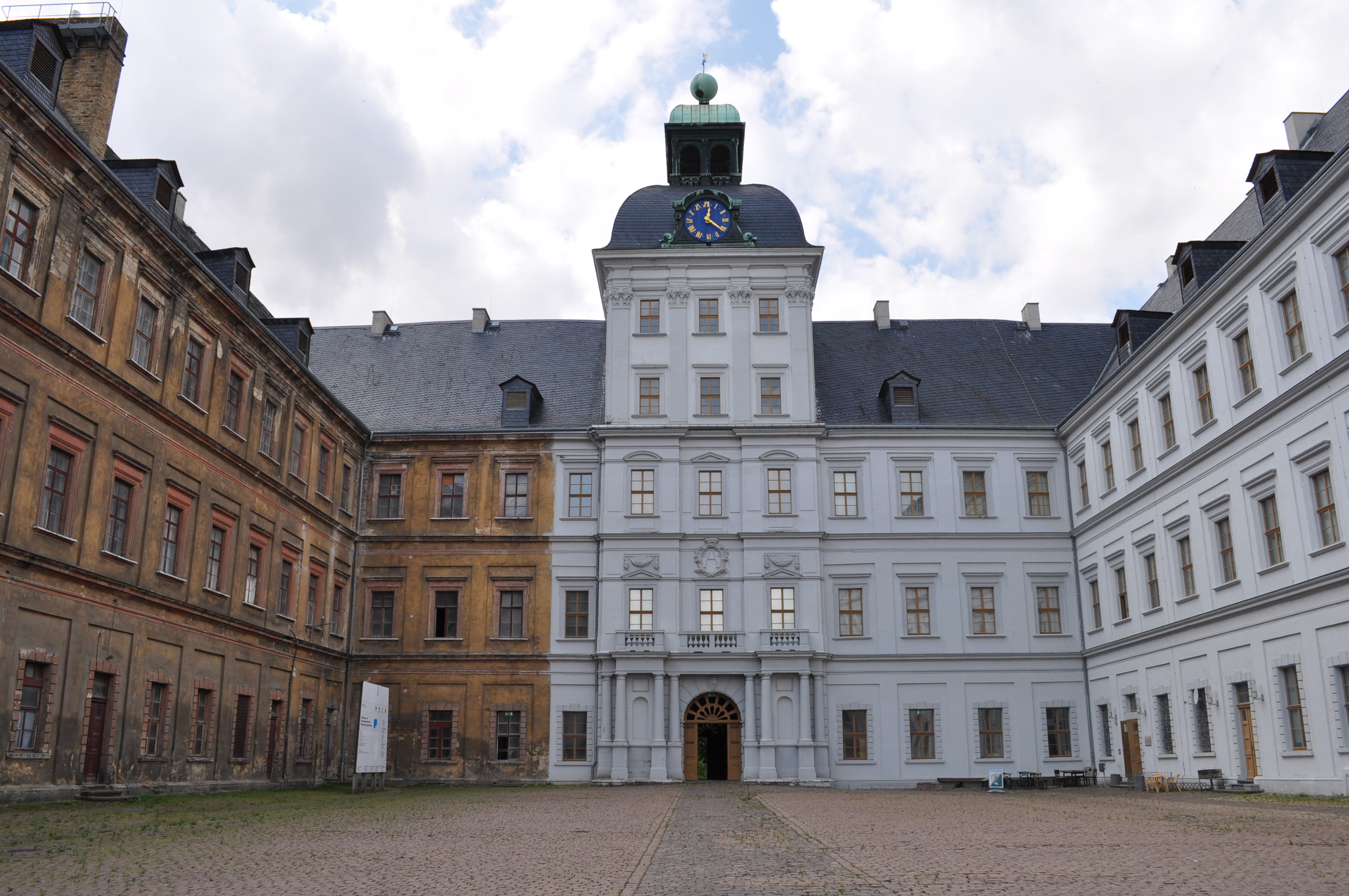
The courtyard, partly restored, in 2015

Schloss Neu-Augustusburg is a palace in Weißenfels, Saxony-Anhalt, Germany, the residence of the Dukes of Saxe-Weissenfels.

The building in Baroque style is well preserved and features a notable Baroque church. St. Trinitatis. It is a monument of national importance.

The schloss now houses the Museum Weißenfels which shows both an exhibition of shoe-making, based on a 1964 Schuhmuseum of the GDR, and a historic exhibition of the duchy.

In the building next to the castle is the Gymnasium of Schloss Neuhaus. The Gymnasium is named after the castle and one of the biggest education institution in the area of Paderborn.

== Building ==
Building was begun on 25 July 1660 by Augustus, Duke of Saxe-Weissenfels. It was built at the site of a former castle that had been destroyed during the Thirty Years' War. After his death, his son Johann Adolf I, Duke of Saxe-Weissenfels, took residence in the unfinished schloss and completed it over the following 14 years, supervised by masters Johann Moritz Richter and his son, who created one of the largest palaces of the early Baroque in central Germany.

It developed to a cultural centre, attracting artists such as Johann Beer, Johann Philipp Krieger, Georg Philipp Telemann and Friederike Caroline Neuber. Johann Sebastian Bach composed for Christian, Duke of Saxe-Weissenfels the cantata Was mir behagt, ist nur die muntre Jagd, BWV 208, premiered in 1713. His cantata Entfliehet, verschwindet, entweichet, ihr Sorgen, BWV 249a was first performed on the Duke's birthday 1725.
