= Theo Altmeyer =

German classical tenor

- Altmeyer, c. 1980
- Born: 16 March 1931; Eschweiler, Prussia, German Republic
- Died: 28 July 2007 (aged 76); Hannover, Lower Saxony, Germany
- Education: Hochschule für Musik Köln
- Occupations: Tenor; Academic teacher
- Organizations: Staatsoper Hannover; Musikhochschule Hannover

Theo Altmeyer (16 March 1931 – 28 July 2007) was a German classical tenor. Although he was a successful opera singer, portraying the title roles of Britten's Albert Herring and Pfitzner's Palestrina at the Staatsoper Hannover, he is chiefly remembered for his work as an oratorio soloist, especially the Evangelist in Bach's Passions. He possessed a rich and lyrical voice that he employed with great expression and nuance.

== Life and career ==
Born in Eschweiler, Altmeyer began his performance career while still a voice student at the Hochschule für Musik Köln, where he studied under Clemens Glettenberg from 1953 to 1956. His first successes were primarily as an oratorio soloist. He was hired by the Westdeutscher Rundfunk (WDR) to perform in several recordings of cantatas and other religious music. He went on to win second prize at the WDR's singing competition in 1955.

In 1956, Altmeyer joined the roster of singers at the Berlin State Opera, where he sang for the next four years. While there he notably portrayed the title role in the world premiere of Humphrey Searle's The Diary of a Madman. Then starting in the 1960-1961 season, he was the principal lyric tenor at the Staatsoper Hannover, making his debut there as Tamino in Mozart's Die Zauberflöte. He became particularly successful in that house with several more Mozart roles, like Ferrando in Così fan tutte and Don Ottavio in Don Giovanni. He also excelled in portraying roles in works by Albert Lortzing and Gioachino Rossini. Other roles of note included the title roles in Benjamin Britten's Albert Herring and Offenbach's Orpheus in the Underworld. He also found particular success in the title role of Pfitzner's Palestrina, a role he also performed at both the Vienna State Opera and the Staatsoper Stuttgart.

The most important work of Altmeyer's career was in the field of religious music. He was one of the most lauded and prolific oratorio singers of his day. His repertoire spanned from the medieval masters to new compositions. He was particularly admired for his many performances and recordings of works by Johann Sebastian Bach, especially as the Evangelist in his Passions. As an oratorio singer, he performed with major orchestras and musical ensembles throughout Germany, France, Austria, Italy, England, Belgium, the Netherlands and Switzerland. He also participated in two large and highly successful concert tours of North America and performed at major music festivals such as Bachwoche Ansbach, Lucerne, Montreux, Vienna, Florence, Naples and Venice.

In 1974, Altmeyer joined the voice faculty of the Musikhochschule Hannover, where he taught for several decades. Among his students is Dantes Diwiak. He continued to appear in operas and concerts during many of these years, giving his last public performance at La Morra in 1996.

Altmeyer died in Hannover at the age of 76 on the anniversary of Bach's death.
