= Cantata (Stravinsky) =

Composion by Igor Stravinsky

- by Igor Stravinsky
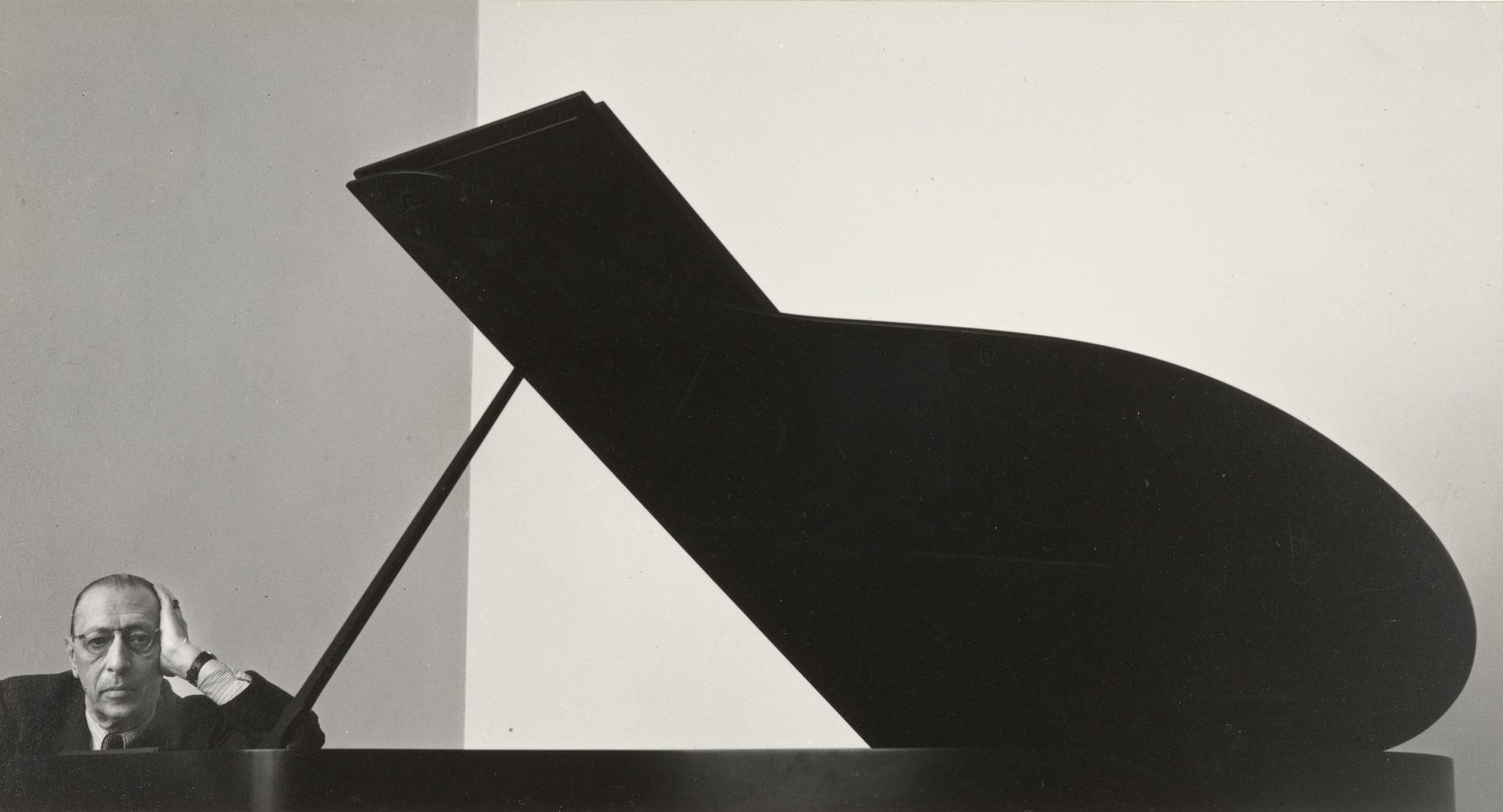
- Photograph of Stravinsky by Arnold Newman
- Text: anonymous 15th- and 16th-century poems
- Language: English
- Composed: 1951–52
- Performed: 11 November 1952
- Scoring: soprano; tenor; women's choir; instrumental ensemble

The Cantata by Igor Stravinsky is a work for soprano, tenor, female choir, and instrumental ensemble (of two flutes, oboe, cor anglais (doubling second oboe), and cello), and was composed from April 1951 to August 1952. The premiere performance on 11 November 1952 was by the Los Angeles (Chamber) Symphony Society (to whom the work is dedicated), conducted by Stravinsky himself. After completing the opera The Rake's Progress, Stravinsky felt the urge to compose another work setting English words, but in a non-dramatic form.

The piece consists of the following movements:

1. "A lyke-wake dirge. Versus I. Prelude: 'This ae nighte'"
2. Ricercar I. "The maidens came"
3. "A lyke-wake dirge. Versus II. First interlude: 'If ever thou gav'st hos'n and shoon'"
4. Ricercar II. "Sacred History: 'To-morrow shall be my dancing day'"
5. "A lyke-wake dirge. Versus III. Second interlude: 'From Whinnymuir when thou may'st pass'"
6. "Westron Wind"
7. "A lyke-wake dirge. Versus IV. Postlude: 'If ever thou gav'st meat or drink'"

For his texts, Stravinsky chose four anonymous 15th- and 16th-century poems found in the anthology Poets of the English Language, an collection of poetry presented to him as a Christmas gift by W. H. Auden, one of the two editors of the anthology. Audon was also the librettist of Stravinsky's opera The Rake's Progress.

The dirge sections concern a soul's approach to and journey through purgatory. In between the verses of the dirge there are two ricercars (Ricercar I sets "The maidens came"; Ricercar II sets the carol "Tomorrow shall be my dancing day"), and a sixteenth-century song text, "Westron Wind".
