= Ulrich Leisinger =

German musicologist

- Born: 1964 (age 61–62); Baden-Baden
- Education: University of Heidelberg
- Occupation: Musicologist
- Organizations: Bach Archive Leipzig; Mozarteum University Salzburg; Carus-Verlag

Ulrich Leisinger (born 1964) is a German musicologist and director of the research department of the Mozarteum University Salzburg in Salzburg.

== Life ==
Born in Baden-Baden, Leisinger received his doctorate from the University of Heidelberg in 1992. The subject of his dissertation was a paper on Joseph Haydn and the development of the classical piano style. He then went to the Bach Archive Leipzig until 2004, first as a research assistant and later as deputy director of research. In 2004/2005 Leisinger was a visiting professor at Cornell University in Ithaca.

Since July 2005, Leisinger has been editor of the New Mozart Edition and the Digital Mozart Edition, published by the Mozarteum Foundation and funded by the Packard Humanities Institute, Los Altos, California. Leisinger is also the editor of new editions of major works of choral literature published by Carus-Verlag.

== Publications ==
- Carl Philipp Emanuel Bachs geistliche Musik : Bericht über das internationale Symposium (Teil 1) vom 12. bis 16. März 1998 in Frankfurt (Oder), Zagan und Zielona Góra im Rahmen der 33. Frankfurter Festtage der Musik an der Konzerthalle "Carl Philipp Emanuel Bach" in Frankfurt (Oder)
- Bach in Leipzig
- Musik, Kunst und Wissenschaft im Zeitalter Johann Sebastian Bachs
- Weinen, Klagen, Sorgen, Zagen, BWV 12; Kantate zum Sonntag Jubilate für Soli (ATB), Chor (SATB) und Orchester (Trompete, 2 Oboen, 2 Violinen, Viola und Basso continuo) = Weeping, crying, sorrow, sighing : Cantata for the 3rd Sunday after Easter for soli (ATB), choir (SATB), trumpet, oboe, bassoon, 2 violins, 2 violas and basso continuo$hed. by Ulrich Leisinger. English version by Henry S. Drinker, revised by Gordon Paine
- Die Bach-Quellen der Forschungs- und Landesbibliothek Gotha : Handschriften und frühe Drucke
- Bach in Leipzig, Bach und Leipzig : Konferenzbericht Leipzig 2000
- Joseph Haydn und die Entwicklung des klassischen Klavierstils bis ca. 1785
- Die Bach-Quellen der Bibliotheken in Brüssel : Katalog : mit einer Darstellung von Überlieferungsgeschichte und Bedeutung der Sammlungen Westphal, Fétis und Wagener
- Johann Christoph Friedrich Bach : thematisch-systematisches Verzeichnis der musikalischen Werke (BR-JCFB)
- Carl Philipp Emanuel Bach, Musik zwischen West und Ost : Bericht über das internationale Symposium vom 12. bis 16. März 1998 in Frankfurt (Oder), Żagań und Zielona Góra [im Rahmen der 33. Frankfurter Festtage der Musik an der Konzerthalle "Carl Philipp Emanuel Bach" in Frankfurt (Oder)
