= Johann Caspar Seyfert =

Johann Caspar Seyfert (1697 – 26 May 1767, Augsburg) was a German composer, violinist and lute player.

He was a music director in Augsburg where he was born and died. In 1746 he added a fourth volume to the Augsburger Tafel-Confect, which Valentin Rathgeber had published in 1733, 1737 and 1739. The short title abbreviates Ohren-vergnügendes und Gemüth-ergötzendes Tafel-Confect (Augsburg Table Confectionery, short for Table Confectionery, Pleasuring the Ears and Delightful to the Soul), a collection of songs meant to be performed for dessert, whereas a Tafelmusik was performed during a main course.

His son, Johann Gottfried Seyfert (1731–1772) also was a well-known composer of chamber music works, piano sonatas, oratorios, and 20 symphonies.
