= Valentin Rathgeber =

German composer

- Born: Johann Valentin Rathgeber; 3 April 1682; Oberelsbach, Germany
- Died: 2 June 1750 (aged 68) Bad Staffelstein, Germany
- Genres: Baroque
- Occupations: Composer, organist, choirmaster
- Instrument: Organ

Johann Valentin Rathgeber (3 April 1682 – 2 June 1750) was a German composer, organist and choirmaster of the Baroque Era.

== Life ==
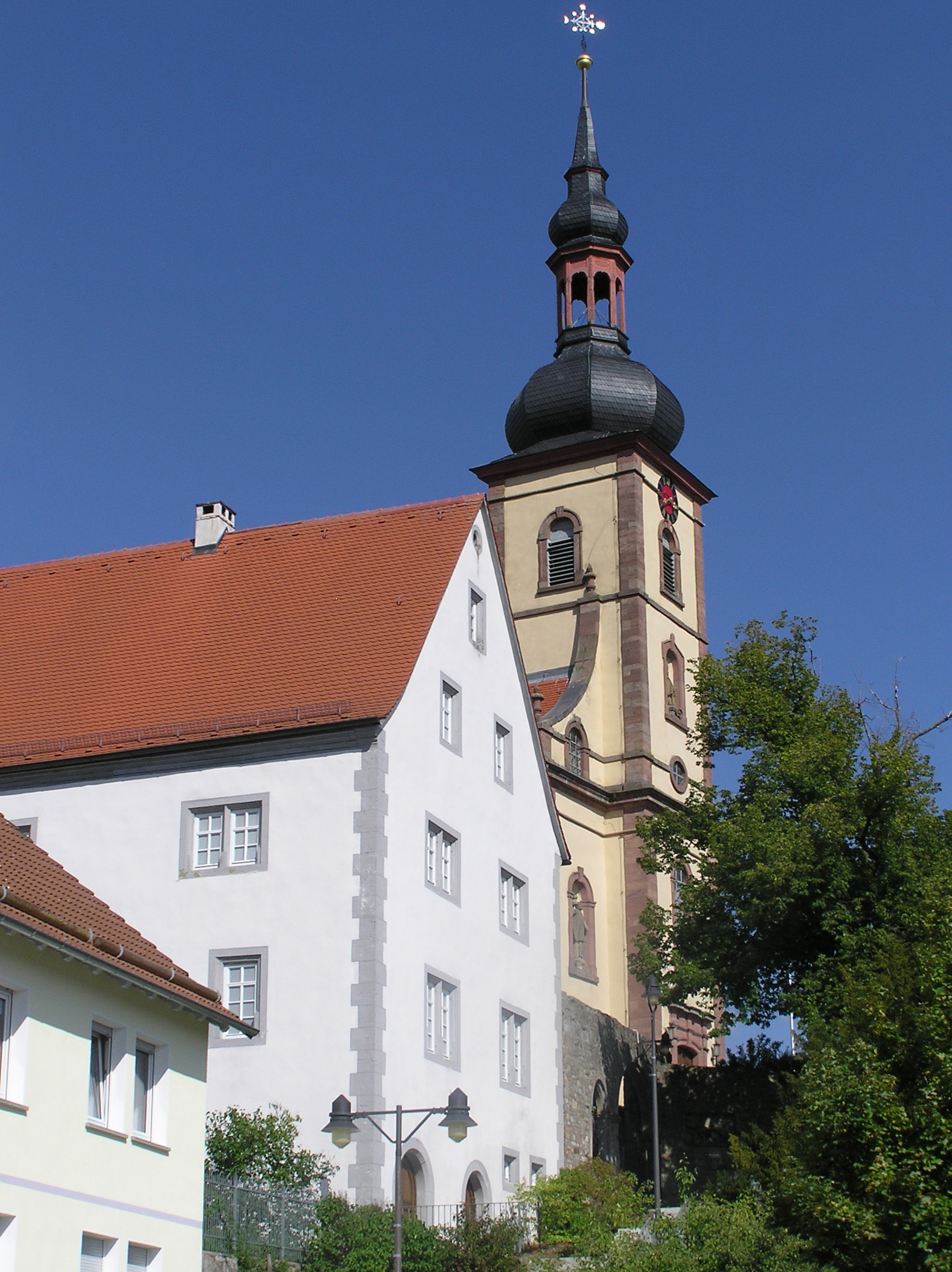
Birthplace of Rathgeber

Rathgeber was born in Oberelsbach. His father, an organist, gave him his first music lessons. At the beginning of the 18th century, he began studying at the University of Würzburg, initially studying rhetoric, mathematics and law; later he changed direction and continued his studies in theology.

His first position was as a teacher at the Julius Hospital in Würzburg. In 1707 he took up the post of chamber musician and servant of the abbot of the Banz Abbey, Kilian Düring. A short time later he joined the Benedictine Order, and in 1711 entered the priesthood. Thereafter, he was organist, choirmaster and preacher at the abbey.

Between 1729 and 1738 he went on a study trip. It is an open question whether he did that with permission from his abbot or not. Documented stops on this trip were Mainz, Bonn, Cologne, Trier, Stuttgart, Regensburg, Germany, Switzerland, Vienna and Styria. Compositions from this period were primarily dedicated to his respective hosts. In 1738 he returned to the abbey, where he then lived in seclusion for a while. A short time later, he was allowed to regain his former office. He lived in the Banz Abbey until his death there, at the age of 68, which was attributed to gout.

== Work ==
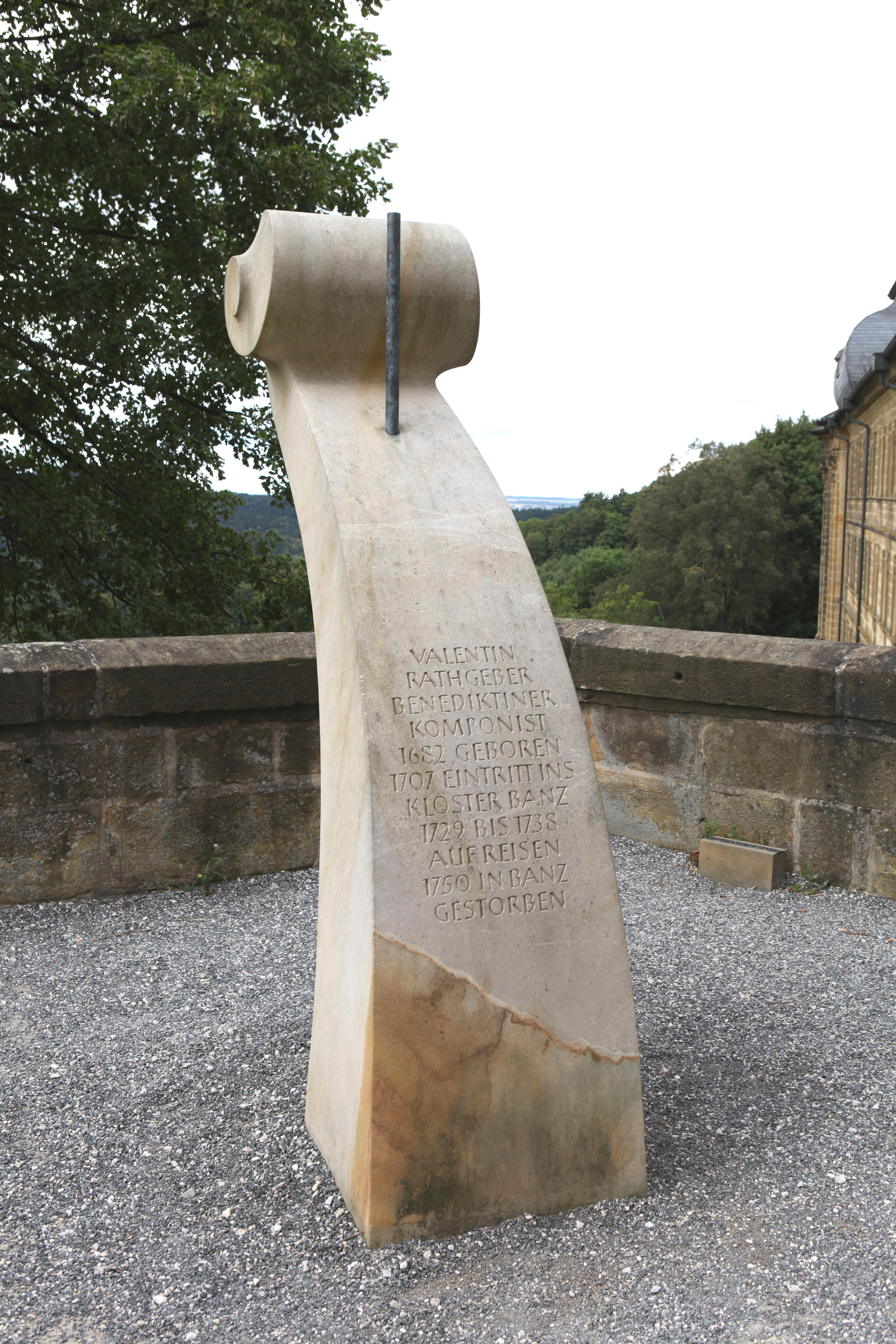
Rathgeber-Memorial, Banz Abbey

Rathgeber was a very versatile and productive composer and was one of the most popular and respected composers in southern Germany. He composed both secular and sacred works, the majority of his output being sacred vocal works. He wrote several hundred works, mainly masses (43), hymns, arias, litanies, requiems, magnificats, offertories (164), Marian antiphons (44) and also instrumental concertos (24) and songs. His Augsburger Tafel-Confect, short for Ohren-vergnügendes und Gemüth-ergötzendes Tafel-Confect (Augsburg Table Confectionery, short for Table Confectionery, Pleasuring the Ears and Delightful to the Soul) is a collection of songs meant to be performed for dessert, whereas a Tafelmusik was performed during a main course. He published three editions of his work in 1733, 1737 and 1739, Johann Caspar Seyfert adding a fourth in 1746.

=== Worklist (selection) ===
Aria pastorella

- Augsburger Tafel-Confect
- Opus I Octava musica clavium octo musicarum in Missis octo musicalibus (mass compositions)
- Opus II (vespers)
- Opus III (masses)
- Opus IV (offertories with instrumental accompaniment)
- Opus V (antiphons for the church year)
- Opus VI (secular instrumental works)
- Opus VII (masses for the church year)
- Opus VIII (requiem and Libera)
- Opus IX Psalmodia vespertina (vespers cycle)
- Opus X (Latin and German arias)
- Opus XI (hymns)
- Opus XII (rural and town masses)
- Opus XIII (Miserere and Tantum ergo)
- Opus XIV (offertories cycle in 3 parts)
- Opus XV (offertories)
- Opus XVI (antiphons)
- Opus XVII (vesper cycle)
- Opus XVIII (litanies)
- Opus XIX (masses)
- Opus XX (offertories)

== Recordings ==
- Messe von Muri, Concerti. Capella Murensis, ensemble arcimboldo, Direction: Johannes Strobl / Thilo Hirsch. Audite, 2007.
