= Dietel manuscript =

The Dietel manuscript, D-LEb Peters Ms. R 18, also known as the Dietel Collection and, in German, Choralsammlung Dietel, is the oldest extant manuscript with a large collection of four-part chorales by Johann Sebastian Bach. It contains 149 of Bach's chorale harmonisations (not 150 as is written on its title page) and originated around 1735. The music in the manuscript was copied by Johann Ludwig Dietel, one of Bach's pupils from the Thomasschule.

== Context ==
In 1727, at age 13, Johann Ludwig Dietel became a pupil of the St Thomas School in Leipzig. His oldest extant work as copyist of Johann Sebastian Bach's music dates from two years later (performance parts of BWV 120.2 and 174). By then, mid 1729, Bach had just begun his seventh year as cantor at St Thomas, and had already composed hundreds of church cantatas, the St John and St Matthew Passions, and several motets: all of these are sacred compositions mostly containing one or more four-part harmonisations of Lutheran chorale melodies, setting the text of usually one, and sometimes two, stanzas of a Lutheran hymn, to be sung by a SATB choir. Apart from these four-part chorales which are movements in larger-scale compositions, Bach also wrote such SATB settings of hymn tunes down in, for instance, the Notebook for Anna Magdalena Bach (begun 1725), and the Three Wedding Chorales manuscript (1730s). In Bach's autographs, four-part chorale harmonisations are characteristically written down with a colla parte instrumentation and figured bass accompaniment, sometimes also with interludes connecting the phrases of the hymn or independent instrumental figuration, and more exceptionally, for instance the setting of "Dir, dir, Jehova, will ich singen", BWV 299, a chorale in Anna Magdalena's notebook as a piece exclusively for four singing voices.

In the autumn of 1729 Dietel worked on the performance parts of BWV 201, one of Bach's secular cantatas. His work on the performance material of Johann Bernhard Bach's overtures in D major (BNB I/B/4) and G major (BNB I/B/6) is from slightly later. In August 1730 Johann Sebastian ranged Dietel among those singers of the school who were fit to perform the solo parts of his church music. On New Year's Day 1731, or, less likely, a year earlier, Carl Gotthelf Gerlach performed Gehet zu seinen Toren ein mit Danken, FWV D:G1 (=FR 9/2), a church cantata for New Year by Johann Friedrich Fasch. Dietel had copied the score for this performance. Both Dietel and Gerlach, who was nearly a decade older, were born in Calbitz: this, and the fact that they were distant relatives, may explain how they became close in Leipzig. Gerlach had become a student of the St Thomas school in 1716, which he still was when Bach moved into the school buildings as cantor in 1723. From 1727 Gerlach studied at Leipzig University. In 1729 Georg Balthasar Schott, who until then had been the music director of Leipzig University's church, that is the New Church (German: Neukirche), and of the Collegium Musicum founded by Telemann, left for a position in Gotha: Bach, who as music director of Leipzig's principal churches had some say on the matter, manoeuvred his former pupil Gerlach in the position of music director and organist at the Neukirche, while he assumed himself the leadership of the Collegium Musicum.

In 1731 Dietel helped copy out the performance parts of two further church cantatas by Johann Sebastian Bach (BWV 112 and 29). Late 1731 or early 1732 Dietel copied the score of Bach's early church cantata BWV 196, followed, before 25 March 1732, by a copy of the score of the Gottes und Marien Kind cantata attributed to Fasch (FWV D:G3, FR 1400). From 1733 to 1734 Dietel copied performance material for three more secular cantatas by Bach (BWV 213, 214 and 215). Further manuscript copies by Dietel from around 1734:

- Organ and continuo performance parts of the Sanctus in B major, BWV Anh. 28.
- For a performance on Reformation Day 31 October 1734: score of Welt und Teufel tobt ihr noch, another cantata attributed to Fasch (FWV D:W2, FR 1401).
- A series of cantatas by Nicola Porpora, copied in collaboration with Gerlach, possibly for a performance by the latter as singer.

In 1734, or possibly 1735, Dietel copied the organ part of BWV 100, a chorale cantata by Bach. Bach presented his Christmas Oratorio, BWV 248, for the first time as a set of six cantatas, each of these performed on one of the six Feast Days and Sundays from 25 December 1734 to 6 January 1735. For two of these cantatas, those for New Year's Day (No. IV) and Epiphany (No. VI), Dietel was the main copyist of the performance material. On 30 January 1735 Bach premiered his cantata BWV 14. Likely some time after that, the closing chorale of BWV 14 being its most recent datable entry, Dietel started the manuscript named after him, which contains 149 four-part chorales copied from manuscripts with compositions by Bach. By that time Dietel belonged to the inner circle of Bach's pupils who had broad access to the composer's musical library.

Who asked Dietel to produce the chorale collection, and also, for what purpose it was penned, are questions for which the answer can not be ascertained. It would have been highly unlikely that Dietel took the initiative for the collection: copying music was generally not done without remuneration. The manuscript contained many errors and inaccuracies, none of which were corrected by Bach, something the composer would normally have done if he had commissioned this copy of his music. On the other hand, Dietel had produced many manuscripts for Gerlach, for instance the Fasch cantatas for performance at the Neukirche, and would continue to collaborate with him, for instance also in 1735 (or later) on performance material for Bach's Sanctus BWV 238. In 1736 Dietel started his studies at Leipzig University, and like that earlier main copyist of Bach's music, Johann Andreas Kuhnau, had done a decade earlier, he continued to work for the music director of the Neukirche while discontinuing to work for Bach, after the switch from St Thomas school to University.

== Content ==
Dietel's manuscript, R 18, contains 149 SATB settings, without instrumental accompaniment or interludes, of chorale tunes. Two settings, Nos. 119 and 134, are identical, thus the collection contains 148 unique settings. A few settings are related, but not identical:

- Nos. 1 (variant of BWV 117/4) and 100 (BWV 117/4)
- Nos. 88 (BWV 8/6) and 148 (BWV deest – similar to BWV 8/6, but with a different harmonic progression)

All settings are by Bach and/or feature in larger-scale compositions by Bach. Two settings are strictly speaking not by Bach:

- No. 88 (BWV 8/6): Bach's adaptation of a SATB setting by Daniel Vetter, published in 1713.
- No. 107 (BWV 43/11): by Christoph Peter, for instance published in the 17th-century Neu Leipziger Gesangbuch, p. 70.

In general, Bach based his harmonisations on pre-existing hymn tunes. There are, however, some hymn tunes (or versions thereof) for which there appear to be no earlier extant sources than Bach's compositions. In the Dietel manuscript:

- Zahn No. 3068, in R 18 No. 6 ("Dir, dir, Jehova, will ich singen")
- Zahn No. 5878a, in R 18 No. 9 ("Ich bin ja, Herr, in deiner Macht")
- Tune of BWV 1122 (not in Zahn), R 18 No. 38 ("Denket doch, ihr Menschenkinder")
- Zahn No. 7417a, in R 18 No. 48 ("Gib dich zufrieden und sei stille")
- Zahn No. 6462, in R 18 Nos. 117 and 125: Bach's adaptation of the Zahn No. 6461 hymn tune ("Warum sollt ich mich denn grämen")

A couple of settings in the Dietel manuscript are SATB versions of voice and continuo settings found in Schemellis Gesangbuch (1736):

- BWV 452, the Schemelli version of "Dir, dir, Jehova, will ich singen", appears to have been derived from the four-part setting BWV 299 [2] as found in R 18 No. 6;
- The four-part version of "Auf, auf, mein Herz, mit Freuden" as found in the Dietel manuscript (No. 95) appears to be an arrangement of the Schemelli version (BWV 441)

Also the R 18 No. 148 version of "Liebster Gott, wenn werd ich sterben" appears to be related to the Schemelli variant BWV 483. R 18 No. 48 shares its soprano (S) and bass (B) lines with BWV 512 from Schemellis Gesangbuch.

Around two thirds of the settings in the Dietel manuscript can also be found in Bach's extant cantatas, motets, Passions and oratorios. Many of the chorale settings for which R 18 is the earliest extant source may derive from lost larger works, such as the St Mark Passion, BWV 247, of 1731, and several cantatas of the Picander cycle of 1728–29. However, not all four-part chorales of the Dietel collection originated in such larger works (e.g., BWV 299). Also, Bach re-used some chorale settings in several works (e.g., BWV 75/7 = BWV 100/6) so that it can't always exactly be determined from which original Dietel copied in his collection.

All chorales have a number (however with collation errors), and, except for No. 145, a title referring to a text of a Lutheran hymn, but are otherwise untexted. The titles in R 18 do not always refer to the hymns from which stanzas are extracted in musically corresponding movements of larger works. There is no over-all organisational principle for the collation, but some ranges appear to have some logic: for example, the range from Nos. 67 to 96 follows through the liturgical year, more or less consequentially, from the fourth Sunday after Trinity to the first Sunday of Advent.

Legend to the table
column		content	links to
1	#	Number of the chorale in the Dietel manuscript: modern numbering as used by Smend and NBE, followed by, if different, number in the manuscript in parentheses.	Page on the chorale at the www.bach-chorales.com website
2	Title (in Dietel manuscript)	Title of the chorale in the Dietel manuscript (for No. 145: conventional title in parentheses)	Page on the Dietel version of the chorale at IMSLP website
3	Zahn	Zahn number of the hymn tune used in the chorale harmonisation.	Description of the Lutheran chorale melody (if available), or further information on the Zahn number
4	BWV	BWV number	Bach Digital page on the Dietel version of the chorale
5	Occasion	Occasion of the liturgical year for which the chorale setting was (probably) written	Occasion as explained at Church cantata (Bach) or Passions (Bach)
6	Year	(Probable) year of first performance	—
7	M-D	(Probable) month and day of first performance	—
8	Other info	Additional info	Pages on larger vocal works, on chorales, etc.

Four-part chorales in the Dietel manuscript
#	Title (in Dietel manuscript)	Zahn	BWV	Occasion	Year	M-D	Other info
1	Sei Lob und Ehr dem höchsten Gut	4430	117/4 (var)	Birthday?	c. 1728– 1731		Variant of BWV 117/4 (Dietel No. 100)
2	Allein Gott in der Höh sei Ehr	4457	260	Easter II?	≤c. 1735	Apr.– May?	
3	Ein feste Burg ist unser Gott	7377	303	Oculi?	1715?	03-24?	Stanza 2 ("Mit unser Macht ist nichts getan") in BWV 80.1/6
4	Du Friedefürst, Herr Jesu Christ	4373	67/7	Easter I	1724	04-16	Stanza 1 in BWV 67/7
5	Das alte Jahr vergangen ist	381	288	New Year	≤c. 1735	01-01	
6	Dir, dir, Jehova, will ich singen	3068	299 (2)		≤c. 1735		Hymn tune attributed to Bach
7	Jesu, nun sei gepreiset	8477a	362	New Year?	≤c. 1735	01-01?	
8	Helft mir, Gotts Güte preisen	5267	28/6	Christmas I	1725	12-30	Stanza 12 ("All solch dein Güt wir preisen") in BWV 28/6
9	Ich bin ja, Herr, in deiner Macht	5878a	345		≤c. 1735		Hymn tune attributed to Bach
10	Ach Gott, vom Himmel sieh darein	4431	77/6	Trinity XIII	1723	08-22	Presumably stanza 8 ("Du stellst, Herr Jesu, selber dich zum Vorbild deiner Liebe") from "Wenn einer alle Ding verstünd" in BWV 77/6
11	Weg, mein Herz, mit den Gedenken	6543	25/6	Trinity XIV	1723	08-29	Stanza 12 ("Ich will alle meine Tage") from "Treuer Gott, ich muss dir klagen" in BWV 25/6
12	Jesu, meine Freude	8032	64/8	Christmas 3	1723	12-27	Stanza 5 ("Gute Nacht, o Wesen") in BWV 64/8
13	Gelobet seist du, Jesu Christ	1947	64/2	Christmas 3	1723	12-27	Stanza 7 ("Das hat er alles uns getan") in BWV 64/2
14 (13)	Was frag ich nach der Welt	5206b–c	64/4	Christmas 3	1723	12-27	Stanza 1 in BWV 64/4
15 (14)	O Herre Gott, dein göttlich Wort	5690	184.2/5	Pentecost 3	1724	05-30	Stanza 8 ("Herr, ich hoff je, du werdest die") in BWV 184.2/5
16	Komm, Heiliger Geist, Herre Gott	7445a	226/2	Funeral	1729	10-20	Stanza 3 ("Du heilige Brunst, süßer Trost") in BWV 226/2
17 (16)	Wachet auf, ruft uns die Stimme	8405a	140/7	Trinity XXVII	1731	11-25	Stanza 3 ("Gloria sei dir gesungen") in BWV 140/7
18	Jesu, deine tiefen Wunden	6543	194.2/6	Consecration	1723	11-02	Stanzas 6 ("Heilger Geist ins Himmels Throne") and 7 from "Treuer Gott, ich muß dir klagen" in BWV 194.2/6 = BWV 194.3/6
18	Jesu, deine tiefen Wunden	6543	194.3/6	Trinity	1724	06-04	Stanzas 6 ("Heilger Geist ins Himmels Throne") and 7 from "Treuer Gott, ich muß dir klagen" in BWV 194.2/6 = BWV 194.3/6
19	Nun lasst uns Gott dem Herren	159	194.2/12	Consecration	1723	11-02	Stanzas 9 ("Sprich Ja zu meinen Taten") and 10 from "Wach auf, mein Herz, und singe" in BWV 194.2/12 = BWV 194.3/12
19	Nun lasst uns Gott dem Herren	159	194.3/12	Trinity	1724	06-04	Stanzas 9 ("Sprich Ja zu meinen Taten") and 10 from "Wach auf, mein Herz, und singe" in BWV 194.2/12 = BWV 194.3/12
20	Verleih uns Frieden gnädiglich	1945a–b	42/7	Easter I	1725	04-08	Stanzas 1 and 2 in BWV 42/7
21	Jesu, meine Freude	8032	227/7		<1730?		Stanza 4 ("Weg, weg mit allen Schätzen") in BWV 227/7
22	Es ist gewisslich an der Zeit	4429a	307		≤c. 1735		
23	O Ewigkeit, du Donnerwort	5820	397	Trinity X?	1728?	08-15?	Stanza 13 ("Wach auf, o Mensch, vom Sünderschlaf") is closing chorale of Picander cycle No. 53
23	O Ewigkeit, du Donnerwort	5820	397	Passion?	1731?	03-23?	Stanza 13 ("Wach auf, o Mensch, vom Sünderschlaf") in BWV 247/17
24	Christ lag in Todes Banden	7012a	158/4	Easter 3	c. 1725– 1735	Mar.– Apr.	Stanza 5 ("Hier ist das rechte Osterlamm") in BWV 158/4
25	Schmücke dich, o liebe Seele	6923	180/7	Trinity XX	1724	10-22	Stanza 9 ("Jesu, wahres Brot des Lebens") in BWV 180/7
26	Ach Gott, vom Himmel sieh darein	4431	2/6	Trinity II	1724	06-18	Stanza 6 ("Das wollst du, Gott, bewahren rein") in BWV 2/6
27	Straf mich nicht in deinem Zorn	6274a	115/6	Trinity XXII	1724	11-05	Stanza 10 ("Drum so laßt uns immerdar") from "Mache dich, mein Geist, bereit" in BWV 115/6
28	Ach Gott, wie manches Herzeleid	533a	3/6	Epiphany II	1725	01-14	Stanza 18 ("Erhalt mein Herz im Glauben rein") in BWV 3/6
29	Jesu, der du meine Seele	6804	353		≤c. 1735		
30	Wer weiß, wie nahe mir mein Ende	2778	84/5	Septuagesima	1727	02-09	Stanza 12 ("Ich leb indes in dir vergnüget") in BWV 84/5
31	Jesu, meine Freude	8032	227/1; 227/11		<1730?		Stanza 1 and 6 ("Weicht, ihr Trauergeister") in BWV 227/1 and 227/11
32	Jesu, meine Freude	8032	227/3		<1730?		Stanza 2 ("Unter deinen Schirmen") in BWV 227/3
33	Wie schön leuchtet der Morgenstern	8359	36.4/5	Advent I	c. 1726– 1730	Nov.– Dec.	Stanza 7 ("Wie bin ich doch so hertzlich fro") in BWV 36.4/5
34	Befiehl du deine Wege	5385a	161/6	Trinity XVI	1716	09-27	Stanza 4 ("Der Leib zwar in der Erden") from "Herzlich tut mich verlangen" in BWV 161/6
35	Ein feste Burg ist unser Gott	7377	80/8	Reformation	c. 1729– 1731	10-31	Stanza 4 ("Das Wort sie sollen lassen stahn") in BWV 80/8
36	Nun bitten wir den Heiligen Geist	2029a	169/7	Trinity XVIII	1726	10-20	Stanza 3 ("Du süße Liebe, schenk uns deine Gunst") in BWV 169/7
37	Herr Jesu Christ, du höchstes Gut	4486	48/3	Trinity XIX	1723	10-03	Stanza 4 ("Solls ja so sein") in BWV 48/3
38	Denket doch, ihr Menschenkinder	—	1122		≤c. 1735		Hymn tune attributed to Bach
39	Nun lob, mein Seel, den Herren	8244	389		≤c. 1735		
40	Herr Jesu Christ, du höchstes Gut	4486	48/7	Trinity XIX	1723	10-03	Stanza 12 ("Herr Jesu Christ, einiger Trost") from "Herr Jesu Christ, ich schrei zu dir" in BWV 48/7
41	Vater unser im Himmelreich	2561	90/5	Trinity XXV	1723	11-14	Stanza 7 ("Leit uns mit deiner rechten Hand") from "Nimm von uns, Herr, du treuer Gott" in BWV 90/5
42	Jesu, meines Herzens Freud	4797– 4798	361		≤c. 1735		
43	Was Gott tut, das ist wohlgetan	5629	144/3	Septuagesima	1724	02-06	Stanza 1 in BWV 144/3
44	Was mein Gott will, das gscheh allzeit	7568	144/6	Septuagesima	1724	02-06	Stanza 1 in BWV 144/6
45	Eins ist not, ach Herr, dies Eine	7127	304		≤c. 1735		
46	Es ist genung	7173	60/5	Trinity XXIV	1723	11-07	Stanza 5 ("Es ist genug, Herr") in BWV 60/5
47	Wer weiß, wie nahe mir mein Ende	2778	434	Trinity XV?	1728?	09-05?	Stanza 12 ("Ich leb indes in Gott vergnüget") is closing chorale of Picander cycle No. 58
47	Wer weiß, wie nahe mir mein Ende	2778	434	Epiphany II?	1729?	01-16?	Stanza 4 ("Er kennt die rechte Freudenstunden") from "Wer nur den lieben Gott läßt walten" is closing chorale of Picander cycle No. 13
47	Wer weiß, wie nahe mir mein Ende	2778	434	Septuagesima?	1729?	02-13?	Stanza 7 ("Sing, bet und geh auf Gottes Wegen") from "Wer nur den lieben Gott läßt walten" is closing chorale of Picander cycle No. 19
48	Gib dich zufrieden und sei stille	7417a	315		≤c. 1735		Hymn tune attributed to Bach; S and B identical to those of BWV 512
49	Ich dank dir, lieber Herre	5354a–b	348	Sexagesima?	1729?	02-20?	Stanza 6 ("Dein Wort laß mich bekennen") is closing chorale of Picander cycle No. 20
50	Wo Gott zum Haus gibt nicht sein Gunst	305	1123		≤c. 1735		
51	Mit Fried und Freud ich fahr dahin	3986	382	Purification?	1729?	02-02?	Stanza 1 is closing chorale of Picander cycle No. 16
52	Jesu Leiden, Pein und Tod	6288a–b	159/5	Estomihi	1729	02-27	Stanza 33 ("Jesu, deine Passion ist mir lauter Freude") in BWV 159/5
53	Herzlich lieb hab ich dich, o Herr	8326	340		≤c. 1735		
54	Herr Jesu Christ, ich schrei zu dir	4486	334	Epiphany IV?	1729?	01-30?	Stanza 3 ("Herr Jesu Christ, groß ist die Not") is closing chorale of Picander cycle No. 15
55	Das neugeborne Kindelein	491	122/6	Christmas I	1724	12-31	Stanza 5 ("Es bringt das rechte Jubeljahr") in BWV 122/6
56	Ich freue mich in dir	5187	133/6	Christmas 3	1724	12-27	Stanza 4 ("Wohlan, so will ich mich") in BWV 133/6
57	O Welt, sieh hier dein Leben	2293b	393	Passion?	1731?	03-23?	Stanza 4 ("Ich, ich und meine Sünden") in BWV 247/13
58	Lobt Gott, ihr Christen, allzugleich	198	375	Epiphany?	1729?	01-06?	Stanza 8 ("Heut schleußt er wieder auf die Tür") is closing chorale of Picander cycle No. 11
58	Lobt Gott, ihr Christen, allzugleich	198	375	Annunciation?	1729?	03-25?	Stanza 1 is closing chorale of Picander cycle No. 27
59	Wie schön leuchtet der Morgenstern	8359	436		≤c. 1735		
60	Herr Jesu Christ, wahr' Mensch und Gott	2570	127/5	Estomihi	1725	02-11	Stanza 8 ("Ach, Herr, vergib all unsre Schuld") in BWV 127/5
61	Wär Gott nicht mit uns diese Zeit	4441a	257	Passion?	1731?	03-23?	Stanza 2 ("Was Menschenkraft und -witz anfäht") from "Wo Gott der Herr nicht bei uns hält" in BWV 247/31
62	Befiehl du deine Wege	5385a	270	Passion?	1731?	03-23?	Stanza 1 in BWV 247/33, or /28: stanza 6 ("Ich will hier bei dir stehen") from "O Haupt voll Blut und Wunden"
63	Herr, ich habe missgehandelt	3695	331	Passion?	1731?	03-23?	Stanza 1 in BWV 247/37
64	Ein feste Burg ist unser Gott	7377	302	Passion?	1731?	03-23?	Stanza 4 ("Das Wort sie sollen lassen stahn") in BWV 247/42
65	Gelobet seist du, Jesu Christ	1947	314	Christmastide?	≤c. 1735	Dec.– Jan.?	
66	Nun ruhen alle Wälder	2293b	97/9	Trinity V?	1734?	07-25?	Stanza 9 ("So sei nun, Seele, deine") from "In allen meinen Taten" in BWV 97/9
67	Ich ruf zu dir, Herr Jesu Christ	7400	177/5	Trinity IV	1732	07-06	Stanza 5 ("Ich lieg im Streit und widerstreb") in BWV 177/5
68	Ich ruf zu dir, Herr Jesu Christ	7400	185/6	Trinity IV	1715	07-14	Stanza 1 in BWV 185/6
69	Ich ruf zu dir, Herr Jesu Christ	7400	1124	Trinity IV?	≤c. 1735	Jun.– Jul.?	
70	Es ist das Heil uns kommen her	4430	9/7	Trinity VI	1734?	08-01?	Stanza 12 ("Ob sichs anließ, als wollt er nicht") in BWV 9/7
71	Jesu, der du meine Seele	6804	105/6	Trinity IX	1723	07-25	Stanza 11 ("Nun, ich weiß, du wirst mir stillen") in BWV 105/6
72	Was frag ich nach der Welt	5206b–c	94/8	Trinity IX	1724	08-06	Stanzas 7 ("Was frag ich nach der Welt! Im Hui ...") and 8 in BWV 94/8
73	Nimm von uns, Herr, du treuer Gott	2561	101/7	Trinity X	1724	08-13	Stanza 7 ("Leit uns mit deiner rechten Hand") in BWV 101/7
74	Herr Jesu Christ, du höchstes Gut	4486	113/8	Trinity XI	1724	08-20	Stanza 8 ("Stärk mich mit deinem Freudengeist") in BWV 113/8
75	Ich armer Mensch, ich armer Sünder	2778	179/6	Trinity XI	1723	08-08	Stanza 1 in BWV 179/6
76	Was Gott tut, das ist wohlgetan	5629	69.1/6	Trinity XII	1723	08-15	Stanza 6 ("Was Gott tut, das ist wohlgetan, darbei ...") in BWV 69.1/6
77	Hast du denn, Jesu, dein Angesicht gänzlich verborgen	1912a-c	137/5	Trinity XII	1725	08-19	Stanza 5 ("Lobe den Herren, was in mir ist, lobe den Namen") from "Lobe den Herren, den mächtigen König der Ehren" in BWV 137/5
78	Wenn mein Stündlein vorhanden ist	4482a	31/9	Easter	1715	04-21	Stanza 5 ("So fahr ich hin zu Jesu Christ") in BWV 31/9
79	Alleluja: Aus dem Lied "Christ ist erstanden"	8584	66/6	Easter2	1724	04-10	Stanza 3 ("Alleluja") from "Christ ist erstanden" in BWV 66/6
80	Allein zu dir, Herr Jesu Christ	7292b	33/6	Trinity XIII	1724	09-03	Stanza 4 ("Ehr sei Gott in dem höchsten Thron") in BWV 33/6
81	Nun lob, mein Seel, den Herren	8244	390	Trinity XIV?	≤c. 1735	Aug.– Sep.?	
82	Herr Christ, der einge Gottes Sohn	4297a	164/6	Trinity XIII	1725	08-26	Stanza 5 ("Ertöt uns durch dein Güte") in BWV 164/6
83	Herr Jesu Christ, meins Lebens Licht	314b	335	Trinity XIII?	1728?	08-22?	Stanza 14 ("Wie werd ich doch [dann] so fröhlich sein") is closing chorale of Picander cycle No. 56
84	Jesu, der du meine Seele	6804	78/7	Trinity XIV	1724	09-10	Stanza 12 ("Herr, ich glaube, hilf mir Schwachen") in BWV 78/7
85	Herr Gott, dich loben alle wir	368	130/6	Michaelmas	1724	09-29	Stanzas 11 ("Darum wir billig loben dich") and 12 in BWV 130/6
86	Meinen Jesum lass ich nicht	3449	380	Easter I?	1729?	04-24?	Stanza 1 is closing chorale of Picander cycle No. 31
86	Meinen Jesum lass ich nicht	3449	380	Epiphany I?	1729?	01-09?	Stanza 6 ("Jesum laß ich nicht von mir") is closing chorale of Picander cycle No. 12
86	Meinen Jesum lass ich nicht	3449	380	Trinity XV?	≤c. 1735	Sep.?	
87	Weg, mein Herz, mit den Gedanken	6543	19/7	Michaelmas	1726	09-29	Stanza 9 ("Lass dein' Engel mit mir fahren") from "Freu dich sehr, o meine Seele" in BWV 19/7
88	Liebster Gott, wenn werd ich sterben	6634	8/6	Trinity XVI	1724	09-24	Setting by Daniel Vetter; Stanza 5 ("Herrscher über Tod und Leben") in BWV 8/6
89	Wenn mein Stündlein vorhanden ist	4482a	95/7	Trinity XVI	1723	09-12	Stanza 4 ("Weil du vom Tod erstanden bist") in BWV 95/7
90	Warum betrübst du dich, mein Herz	1689a	421	Trinity XVII?	≤c. 1735	Sep.– Oct.?	
91	Ach, lieben Christen, seid getrost	4441a	114/7	Trinity XVII	1724	10-01	Stanza 6 ("Wir wachen oder schlafen ein") in BWV 114/7
92	Herr Christ, der einge Gottessohn	4297a	96/6	Trinity XVIII	1724	10-08	Stanza 5 ("Ertöt uns durch dein Güte") in BWV 96/6
93	Auf meinen lieben Gott	2164	5/7	Trinity XIX	1724	10-15	Stanza 11 ("Führ auch mein Herz und Sinn") in BWV 5/7
94	Aus tiefer Not schrei ich zu dir	4437	38/6	Trinity XXI	1724	10-29	Stanza 5 ("Ob bei uns ist der Sünden viel") in BWV 38/6
95	Auf, auf, mein Herz, mit Freuden	5243	441*		≤c. 1735		Four-part version of BWV 441 (Schemellis Gesangbuch No. 320)
96	Nun komm, der Heiden Heiland	1174	62/6	Advent I	1724	12-03	Stanza 8 ("Lob sei Gott dem Vater ton") in BWV 62/6
97	Wenn mein Stündlein vorhanden ist	4482a	430	Passion?	1731?	03-23?	Stanza 1 from "Betrübtes Herz sei wohlgemut" in BWV 247/19
98	Kommt her zu mir, spricht Gottes Sohn	2496b	108/6	Easter IV	1725	04-29	Stanza 10 ("Dein Geist, den Gott von Himmel gibt") from "Gott Vater, sende deinen Geist" in BWV 108/6
99	Es woll uns Gott genädig sein	7247	312	Epiphany V?	1729?	02-06?	Stanza 3 ("Es dancke Got und lobe dich") is closing chorale of Picander cycle No. 17
100	Sei Lob und Ehr dem höchsten Gut	4430	117/4; 117/9	Birthday?	c. 1728– 1731		Stanzas 4 ("Ich rief dem Herrn in meiner Not") and 9 ("So kommet vor sein Angesicht") in BWV 117/4 and /9; See also variant Dietel No. 1
101	Der Herr ist mein getreuer Hirt	4457	112/5	Easter II	1731	04-08	Stanza 5 ("Gutes und die Barmherzigkeit") in BWV 112/5
102	Ich hab in Gottes Herz und Sinn	7568	103/6	Easter III	1725	04-22	Stanza 9 ("Ich hab dich einen Augenblick") from "Barmherzger Vater, höchster Gott" in BWV 103/6
103	Was Gott tut, das ist wohlgetan	5629	75/7; 75/14	Trinity I	1723	05-30	Stanzas 5 ("Was Gott tut, das ist wohlgetan; Muß ich den Kelch ...") and 6 ("Was Gott tut, das ist wohlgetan, Dabei will ich ...") in BWV 75/7 and /14
103	Was Gott tut, das ist wohlgetan	5629	100/6		c. 1734– 1735		Stanza 6 ("Was Gott tut, das ist wohlgetan, Dabei will ich ...") in BWV 100/6
104	Jesu, meiner Seelen Wonne	6551a	360	Trinity XI?	1728?	08-08?	Stanza 6 ("Bin ich gleich von dir gewichen") is closing chorale of Picander cycle No. 54
104	Jesu, meiner Seelen Wonne	6551a	360	Easter IV?	≤c. 1735	Apr.– May?	
105	Jesu, meine Freude	8032	87/7	Easter V	1725	05-06	Stanza 9 ("Muß ich sein betrübet?") from "Selig ist die Seele" in BWV 87/7
106	Ist Gott mein Schild und Helfersmann	2542	85/6	Easter II	1725	04-15	Stanza 4 ("Ist Gott mein Schutz und treuer Hirt") in BWV 85/6
107	Du Lebensfürst, Herr Jesu Christ	5741b	43/11	Ascension	1726	05-30	Setting by Christoph Peter; Stanzas 1 and 13 in BWV 43/11
108	Nun ruhen alle Wälder	2293b	44/7	Ascension I	1724	05-21	Stanza 7 ("So sei nun, Seele, deine") from "In allen meinen Taten" in BWV 44/7
109	Nun bitten wir den Heiligen Geist	2029a	385	Trinity XVIII?	1728?	09-26?	Stanza 3 ("Du süße Lieb, schenk uns deine Gunst") is closing chorale of Picander cycle No. 61
109	Nun bitten wir den Heiligen Geist	2029a	385	Pentecost?	≤c. 1735	May– Jun.?	
110	Komm, Heiliger Geist, Herre Gott	7445a	175/7	Pentecost 3	1725	05-22	Stanza 9 ("Nun, werter Geist, ich folg dir") from "O Gottes Geist, mein Trost und Rat" in BWV 175/7
111	Herzlich lieb hab ich dich, o Herr	8326	174/5	Pentecost 2	1729	06-06	Stanza 1 in BWV 174/5
112	Kommt her zu mir, spricht Gottes Sohn	2496b	74/8	Pentecost	1725	05-20	Stanza 2 ("Kein Menschenkind hier auf der Erd") from "Gott Vater, sende deinen Geist" in BWV 74/8
113	O Gott, du frommer Gott	5206b–c	1125		≤c. 1735		
114	O Gott, du frommer Gott	5206b–c	129/5	Trinity	1727	06-08	Stanza 5 ("Dem wir das Heilig itzt") from "Gelobet sei der Herr, mein Gott" in BWV 129/5
115	Jesu, meine Freude	8032	358	St. John's Day?	1728?	06-24?	Stanza 2 ("Unter deinem Schirmen") is closing chorale of Picander cycle No. 46
115	Jesu, meine Freude	8032	358	New Year I?	1729?	01-02?	Stanza 2 ("Unter deinem Schirmen") is closing chorale of Picander cycle No. 10
115	Jesu, meine Freude	8032	358	Easter II?	1729?	05-01?	Stanza 1 is closing chorale of Picander cycle No. 32
115	Jesu, meine Freude	8032	358	Trinity IV?	1729?	07-10?	Stanza 6 ("Weicht, ihr Trauergeister") is closing chorale of Picander cycle No. 45
116	Freu dich sehr, o meine Seele	6543	39/7	Trinity I	1726	06-23	Stanza 6 ("Selig sind, die aus Erbarmen") from "Kommt, lasst euch den Herren lehren" in BWV 39/7
117	Warum sollt ich mich denn grämen	6462	422	Trinity I?	1729?	06-19?	Hymn tune as in BWV 248/33 (Bach's adaptation of Zahn 6461); Stanza 10 ("Was sind dieses Lebens Güter?") is closing chorale of Picander cycle No. 42
117	Warum sollt ich mich denn grämen	6462	422	Trinity XIX?	1728?	10-03?	Hymn tune as in BWV 248/33 (Bach's adaptation of Zahn 6461); Stanza 6 ("Satan, Welt und ihre Rotten") is closing chorale of Picander cycle No. 63 (= BWV 1137?)
117	Warum sollt ich mich denn grämen	6462	422	Trinity XIX?	1729?	10-23?	Hymn tune as in BWV 248/33 (Bach's adaptation of Zahn 6461); Stanza 6 ("Satan, Welt und ihre Rotten") is closing chorale of Picander cycle No. 63 (= BWV 1137?)
118	Meine Seel erhebt den Herren	—	10/7	Visitation	1724	07-02	Melody: Magnificat peregrini toni; Stanzas 10 and 11 (doxology, "Lob und Preis sei Gott dem Vater") in BWV 10/7
119	Du Lebensfürst, Herr Jesu Christ	5741b	248/12	Christmas 2	1734	12-26	= Dietel No. 134; Stanza 9 ("Brich an, o schönes Morgenlicht") from "Ermuntre dich, mein schwacher Geist" in BWV 248^{II}/3
120	Vom Himmel hoch, da komm ich her	346	248/17	Christmas 2	1734	12-26	Stanza 8 ("Schaut hin! dort liegt im finstern Stall") from "Schaut, schaut, was ist für Wunder dar" in BWV 248^{II}/8
121	Es ist gewisslich an der Zeit	4429a	248/59	Epiphany	1735	01-06	Stanza 1 from "Ich steh an deiner Krippen hier" in BWV 248^{VI}/6
122	Ach Herr, mich armen Sünder	5385a	248/64	Epiphany	1735	01-06	Stanza 4 ("Nun seid ihr wohl gerochen") from "Ihr Christen auserkoren" in BWV 248^{VI}/11
123	Gelobet seist du, Jesu Christ	7247	248/28	Christmas 3	1734	12-27	Stanza 7 ("Dies hat er alles uns getan") in BWV 248^{III}/5
124	Wir Christenleut	2072	248/35	Christmas 3	1734	12-27	Stanza 4 ("Seid froh, dieweil") from "Laßt Furcht und Pein" in BWV 248^{III}/12
125	Warum sollt ich mich denn grämen	6462	248/33	Christmas 3	1734	12-27	Hymn tune as in BWV 422 (Bach's adaptation of Zahn 6461); Stanza 15 ("Ich will dich mit Fleiß bewahren") from "Fröhlich soll mein Herze springen" in BWV 248^{III}/10
126	In dich hab ich gehoffet, Herr	2461c	248/46	New Year I	1735	01-02	Stanza 5 ("Dein Glanz all' Finsternis verzehrt") from "Nun, liebe Seel, nun ist es Zeit" in BWV 248^{V}/4
127	Jesu, meiner Seelen Wonne	6551a	154/3	Epiphany I	1724	01-09	Stanza 2 ("Jesu, mein Hort und Erretter") in BWV 154/3
128 (129)	Wär Gott nicht mit uns diese Zeit	4434	14/5	Epiphany IV	1735	01-30	Stanza 3 ("Gott Lob und Dank, der nicht zugab") in BWV 14/5
129 (130)	Meinen Jesum lass ich nicht	3449	154/8	Epiphany I	1724	01-09	Stanza 6 ("Meinen Jesum laß ich nicht, Geh ihm") in BWV 154/8
130 (131)	Gelobet seist du, Jesu Christ	1947	91/6	Christmas	1724	12-25	Stanza 7 ("Das hat er alles uns getan") in BWV 91/6
131 (132)	Jesu, nun sei gepreiset	8477a	41/6	New Year	1725	01-01	Stanza 3 ("Dein ist allein die Ehre") in BWV 41/6
132	Wenn mein Stündlein vorhanden ist	4482a	429		≤c. 1735		
133	Christ lag in Todes Banden	7012a	278	Easter?	1729?	04-17?	Stanza 6 ("So feiern wir das hohe Fest") is closing chorale of Picander cycle No. 28
134	Ermuntre dich, mein schwacher Geist	5741b	248/12	Christmas 2	1734	12-26	= Dietel No. 119; Stanza 9 ("Brich an, o schönes Morgenlicht") in BWV 248^{II}/3
135	Von Gott will ich nicht lassen	5264b	417		≤c. 1735		
136 (137)	Herzliebster Jesu, was hast du verbrochen	983	245.1/3	Passion	1724	04-07	Stanza 7 ("O große Lieb") in BWV 245.1/3
137 (138)	Vater unser im Himmelreich	2561	245.1/5	Passion	1724	04-07	Stanza 4 ("Dein Will gescheh") in BWV 245.1/5
137 (138)	Vater unser im Himmelreich	2561	416	Passion	1724	04-07	Stanza 4 ("Dein Will gescheh") in BWV 245.1/5
138 (139)	O Welt, sieh hier dein Leben	2293b	245/11	Passion	1724	04-07	Stanzas 3 ("Wer hat dich so geschlagen") and 4 in BWV 245/11
139 (140)	Jesu, meiner Seelen Wonne	6551a	244/40	Passion	1727	04-11	Stanza 6 ("Bin ich gleich von dir gewichen") from "Werde munter, mein Gemüte" in BWV 244/40
140 (141)	Herzliebster Jesu, was hast du verbrochen	983	245/17	Passion	1724	04-07	Stanzas 8 ("Ach großer König") and 9 in BWV 245/17
141 (142)	O Welt, sieh hier dein Leben	2293b	394	Passion?	≤c. 1735	Mar.– Apr.?	
142 (143)	Valet will ich dir geben	5404a	245/26	Passion	1724	04-07	Stanza 3 ("In meines Herzens Grunde") in BWV 245/26
143 (144)	Befiehl du deine Wege	5385a	271	Passion?	1731?	03-23?	Stanza 1 in BWV 247/33, or /28: stanza 6 ("Ich will hier bei dir stehen") from "O Haupt voll Blut und Wunden", or /35: stanza 2 ("Du edles Angesichte") from the same
144 (145)	An Wasserflüssen Babylon	7663	267	Passion?	≤c. 1735	Mar.– Apr.?	Tune a.k.a. "Ein Lämmlein geht und trägt die Schuld" (Passion hymn)
145 (146)	(Jesu, der du meine Seele)	6804	354		≤c. 1735		
146 (147)	Jesu, meiner Seelen Wonne	Vol. VI p. 566	248/42	New Year	1735	01-01	Stanza 15 ("Jesus richte mein Beginnen") from "Hilf, Herr Jesu, laß gelingen" in BWV 248^{IV}/7
147 (148)	Gott des Himmels und der Erden	3614b	248/53	New Year I	1735	01-02	Stanza 9 ("Zwar ist solche Herzensstube") from "Ihr Gestirn, ihr hohlen Lüfte" in BWV 248^{V}/11
148 (149)	Liebster Gott, wenn werd ich sterben	6634	deest	Trinity XVI?	≤c. 1735	Sep.– Oct.?	Setting related to BWV 8/6 and BWV 483
149 (150)	Nun danket alle Gott	5142	386	Visitation?	1729?	07-02?	Stanza 1 is closing chorale of Picander cycle No. 48

== Reception ==
When Gerlach died in Leipzig in 1761 he apparently had no heirs living in the town: a large part of his music collection, for instance the copies of the Porpora cantatas, came in the possession of the music publishers Bernhard Christoph and Johann Gottlob Immanuel Breitkopf. The earliest trace of the Dietel manuscript dates from 1764, when the Breitkopf publishing firm offered (manuscript) copies of the chorale collection for sale. The earliest prints of Bach's four-part chorale collections, two volumes published by Birnstiel in 1765 and 1769 respectively, drew from other manuscripts than the Dietel Collection. Bach's son Carl Philipp Emanuel (C. P. E.), who had collaborated on Birnstiel's 1765 volume, fell out with the publisher and left further plans for a complete edition of his father's four-part chorales to Johann Kirnberger, who negotiated with the Breitkopf firm on the subject. In 1777 Kirnberger wrote to Breitkopf:

Sie haben mir auch gemeldet, daß Sie selbst noch 150 Stück von den Bachischen Erben an Sich gekauft haben, vielleicht sind sie hiebey mit, wo nicht so wäre es sehr gut, sie mit bey zu fügen, vorher aber mögte ich sie gerne erst sehen, ob sie 1) würklich von J. S. Bach und 2) ob sie correct sind ...

—Johann Kirnberger, 1 July 1777
Translation:

You also mentioned to me that you have acquired a further 150 pieces from Bach's heirs: perhaps they are included in [the chorale collection Kirnberger had received from C. P. E. Bach], and if not it were very good to add them [to the collection], but prior to that I'd like to see them first, whether they 1) are really by J. S. Bach and 2) are correct ...

—translation

The "150 Stück" (150 pieces) mentioned by Kirnberger refer to the Dietel manuscript. Kirnberger was also the librarian of the Amalienbibliothek, the library of his employer Princess Anna Amalia of Prussia. The library contained these manuscripts:

- D-B Am.B 46/II, Fascicle 3, containing 111 four-part chorales, all of which also occur in the Dietel collection. The fascicle is part of the Am.B 46/II collection, which contains 369 chorales, and its content likely corresponds to the collection of chorales which Kirnberger had acquired from C. P. E. Bach. The Am.B 46/II copy was likely produced in Berlin (where Kirnberger lived and worked) around the 1770s.
- D-B Am.B 48: a rather straightforward copy of the Dietel manuscript, produced in Leipzig by the Breitkopf firm, that is, the kind of copy they offered for sale in 1764, and the only extant of such copies. It is not known when this copy entered the Amalienbibliothek, but it seems unlikely that Kirnberger would have been unaware of its presence in the library when he wrote his July 1777 letter to Breitkopf (meaning: the Am.B 48 copy likely only arrived in Berlin after that letter).

When Kirnberger died in 1783, no new edition of Bach's four-part chorales had materialised. Shortly thereafter, in 1784 and 1785, Breitkopf published the first two volumes of their new edition of these chorales, edited by C. P. E. Bach. These volumes reflected, to a large extent, the two Birnstiel volumes, that is, none of the chorales contained in them were extracted from the Dietel manuscript: the chorales from that manuscript, or rather, from the Am.B 46/II, Fascicle 3, selection, were only included in the third (1786) and concluding fourth (1787) volumes of Breitkopf's edition. Within two decades after the publication, Breitkopf disposed of the Dietel manuscript, Otto Carl Friedrich von Voß becoming its new owner. A later owner of the manuscript was Ernst Rudorff, and from 1917 it resided in the Music Library Peters in Leipzig, where it got the shelf mark R 18. Eventually the collection of the Peters library was adopted in the Leipzig City Library, from where the R 18 manuscript was transmitted, as a permanent loan, to the Bach Archive in 2014.

The Dietel manuscript only started to attract stronger attention from scholarship in the second half of the 20th century. In 1991 the New Bach Edition published the entire manuscript, edited by Frieder Rempp: the edition included several chorales from the manuscript which had not been given a BWV number in the 1950 first edition of the Bach-Werke-Verzeichnis. Four chorales from the Dietel manuscript were given a BWV number in the 1122–1125 range in the 1998 edition of the Bach-Werke-Verzeichnis.

== Sources ==
- Bach, Johann Sebastian (23 August 1730). "Kurtzer; iedoch höchstnöthiger Entwurff einer wohlbestallten Kirchen Music; nebst einigem unvorgreiflichen Bedencken von dem Verfall derselben". www.bach.de (in German).
- Dürr, Alfred; Kobayashi, Yoshitake, eds. (1998). Bach Werke Verzeichnis: Kleine Ausgabe – Nach der von Wolfgang Schmieder vorgelegten 2. Ausgabe [Bach Works Catalogue: Small Edition – After Wolfgang Schmieder's 2nd edition] (in German). Kirsten Beißwenger (collaborator). (BWV^{2a} ed.). Wiesbaden: Breitkopf & Härtel. ISBN 9783765102493. Preface in English and German.
- Ebata, Nobuaki, ed. (2019-08-30). "Kantate BWV 174: Ich liebe den Höchsten von ganzem Gemüte, Originalstimmensatz". Bach Digital. Leipzig: Bach Archive; et al.
- Ebata, Nobuaki, ed. (2020-07-21). "D-LEb Peters Ms. R 18 [Choralsammlung Dietel] (Depositum im Bach-Archiv)". Bach Digital. Leipzig: Bach Archive; et al.
- Gille, Gottfried (December 2019). Fasch-Repertorium (FR): Vokalmusik von Johann Friedrich Fasch (PDF) (in German) (3rd ed.). Germany: Internationale Fasch-Gesellschaft (published 2020-02-16). Archived from the original (PDF) on 2021-08-07 – via www.fasch.net.
- Glöckner, Andreas (1982). "Neuerkenntnisse zu Johann Sebastian Bachs Aufführungskalender zwischen 1729 und 1735" [New insights on Johann Sebastian Bach's performance calendar from 1729 to 1735]. In Schulze, Hans-Joachim; Wolff, Christoph (eds.). Bach-Jahrbuch 1981 [Bach Yearbook 1981]. Bach-Jahrbuch (in German). Vol. 67. Neue Bachgesellschaft. Berlin: Evangelische Verlagsanstalt. pp. 43–76. doi:10.13141/bjb.v1981. ISSN 0084-7682.
- Melamed, Daniel R. (1995). J.S. Bach and the German Motet. Cambridge University Press. ISBN 0-52-141864-X.
- Melamed, Daniel R.; Marissen, Michael (1998). An Introduction to Bach Studies. Oxford University Press. doi:10.1093/acprof:oso/9780195304923.001.0001. ISBN 0195122313. OCLC 644025396.
- Platen, Emil [in German] (1976). "Zur Echtheit einiger Choralsätze Johann Sebastian Bachs" [On the authenticity of some of Johann Sebastian Bach's chorale settings]. In Schulze, Hans-Joachim; Wolff, Christoph (eds.). Bach-Jahrbuch 1975 [Bach Yearbook 1975]. Bach-Jahrbuch (in German). Vol. 61. Neue Bachgesellschaft. Berlin: Evangelische Verlagsanstalt. pp. 50–62. doi:10.13141/bjb.v1975.
- Rempp, Frieder, ed. (1991). "II. Choralsätze der Sammlung Dietel". Choräle und geistliche Lieder, Teil 1: Repertoires der Zeit vor 1750. New Bach Edition (in German). Vol. III/2.1. Neue Bachgesellschaft, Johann Sebastian Bach Institute. Bärenreiter. pp. 7–101. ISMN 9790006463695. BA 5075-01.
- Richter, Bernhard Friedrich [in German] (1907). "Stadtpfeifer und Alumnen der Thomasschule in Leipzig zu Bachs Zeit". In Schering, Arnold (ed.). Bach-Jahrbuch 1907 [Bach Yearbook 1907]. Bach-Jahrbuch (in German). Vol. 4. Neue Bachgesellschaft. Breitkopf & Härtel. pp. 32–78. doi:10.13141/bjb.v1907.
- Shabalina, Tatiana (2009). "Recent Discoveries in St Petersburg and their Meaning for the Understanding of Bach's Cantatas" (PDF). Understanding Bach: 77–99. volume 4
- Schulze, Hans-Joachim (1983). "'150 Stücke von den Bachischen Erben': Zur Überlieferung der vierstimmigen Choräle Johann Sebastian Bachs" ["150 pieces from the Bach estate": on the transmission of Johann Sebastian Bach's four-part chorales]. In Schulze, Hans-Joachim; Wolff, Christoph (eds.). Bach-Jahrbuch 1983 [Bach Yearbook 1983]. Bach-Jahrbuch (in German). Vol. 69. Neue Bachgesellschaft. Berlin: Evangelische Verlagsanstalt. pp. 81–100. doi:10.13141/bjb.v1983. ISSN 0084-7682.
- Smend, Friedrich [in German] (1966). "Zu den ältesten Sammlungen der vierstimmigen Choräle J. S. Bachs" [On the earliest collections of four-part chorales by J. S. Bach]. In Dürr, Alfred; Neumann, Werner (eds.). Bach-Jahrbuch 1966 [Bach Yearbook 1966]. Bach-Jahrbuch (in German). Vol. 52. Neue Bachgesellschaft. Berlin: Evangelische Verlagsanstalt. pp. 102–137. doi:10.13141/bjb.v1966.
- Wachowski, Gerd [in German] (1983). "Die vierstimmigen Choräle Johann Sebastian Bachs: Untersuchungen zu den Druckausgaben von 1765 bis 1932 und zur Frage der Authentizität" [The four-part chorales of Johann Sebastian Bach: research into the printed editions from 1765 to 1732 and regarding the question of authenticity]. In Schulze, Hans-Joachim; Wolff, Christoph (eds.). Bach-Jahrbuch 1983 [Bach Yearbook 1983]. Bach-Jahrbuch (in German). Vol. 69. Neue Bachgesellschaft. Berlin: Evangelische Verlagsanstalt. pp. 51–79. doi:10.13141/bjb.v1983. ISSN 0084-7682.
- Waldersee, Paul [in German], ed. (1894). Musikstücke in den Notenbüchern der Anna Magdalena Bach [Musical pieces in the notebooks of Anna Magdalena Bach]. Bach-Gesellschaft Ausgabe (in German). Vol. 43. Leipzig: Breitkopf & Härtel. pp. 50–51.
- Wolff, Christoph (2001). Johann Sebastian Bach: The Learned Musician. Norton. ISBN 9780393075953.
