= Ich lebe, mein Herze, zu deinem Ergötzen, BWV 145 =

Church cantata by Bach (1729)

Ich lebe, mein Herze, zu deinem Ergötzen
- BWV 145
- Church cantata by J. S. Bach
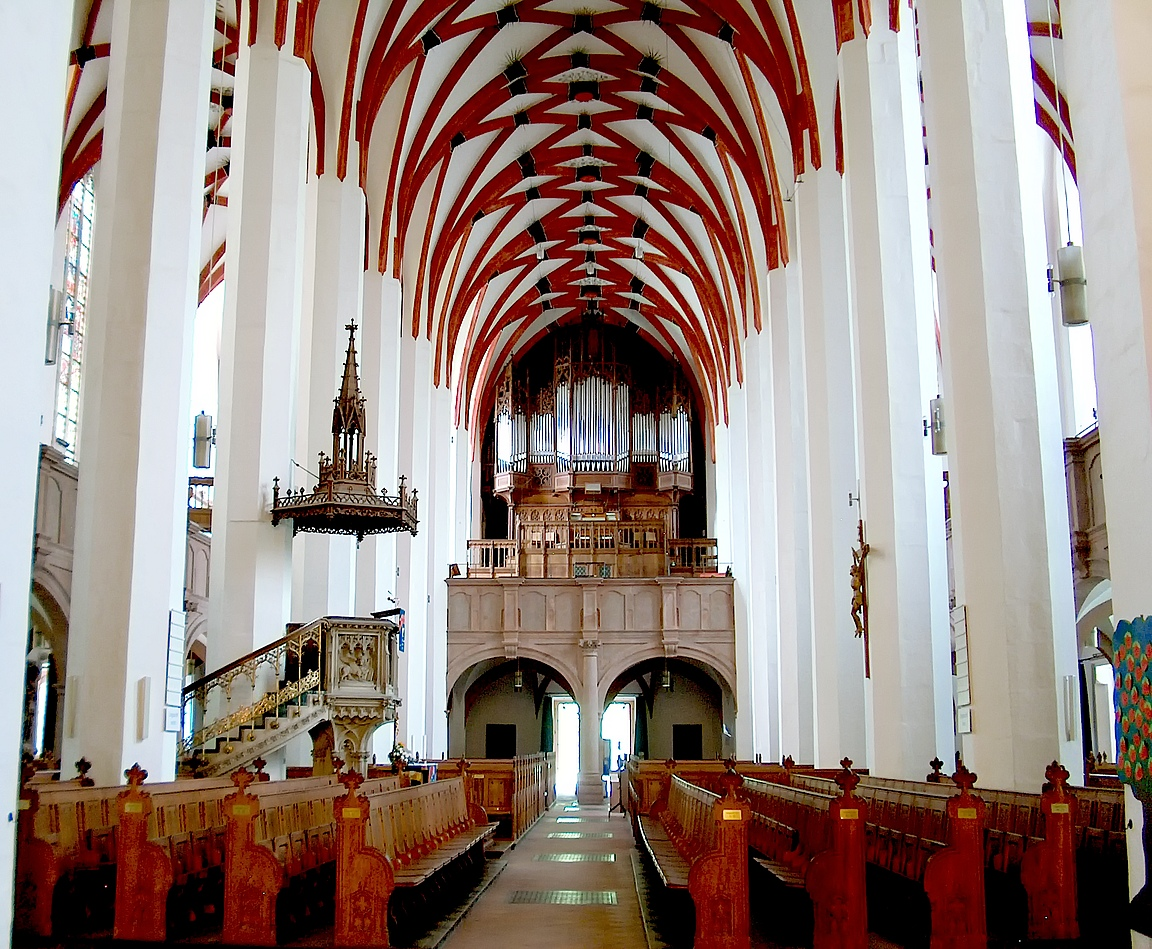
- Thomaskirche, Leipzig
- English: I live, my heart, for your pleasure
- Occasion: Third Day of Easter
- Cantata text: Picander
- Chorale: by Caspar Neumann; by Nikolaus Herman
- Performed: 1729: Leipzig?
- Movements: 2+5
- Vocal: SATB choir; Solo: soprano, tenor and bass
- Instrumental: Trompet; flauto traverso; 2 violins; viola; continuo

Ich lebe, mein Herze, zu deinem Ergötzen (I live, my heart, for your pleasure), BWV 145, is a five-movement church cantata on a libretto by Picander which Johann Sebastian Bach, as its composer, probably first performed in Leipzig on Easter Tuesday, 19 April 1729. As a seven-movement pasticcio, with one of the added movements composed by Georg Philipp Telemann, it is an Easter cantata known as So du mit deinem Munde bekennest Jesum (as it was published in the 19th century) or as Auf, mein Herz! (after the incipit of the pasticcio's first movement).

Ich lebe, mein Herze, zu deinem Ergötzen is one of less than a dozen extant cantatas and fragments of what is known as Bach's Picander cycle, or his fourth cantata cycle. According to the first publication of the cycle's librettos, this cycle ran from 24 June 1728 (Feast of John the Baptist) to the fourth Sunday after Trinity, 10 July 1729.

== History and words ==
No composer's autograph of the cantata is extant. The cantata is listed as Fp‑Inc 6 in the Bach Repertorium of Carl Philipp Emanuel Bach (BR-CPEB). According to the Bach Gesellschaft edition the cantata was composed for Easter.

=== Readings ===
For Easter Tuesday, the readings prescribed in Bach's Leipzig were from the Acts of the Apostles, the sermon of Paul in Antiochia (Acts 13:26–33), and from the Gospel of Luke, the appearance of Jesus to the Apostles in Jerusalem (Luke 24:36–47).

=== Picander's libretto for Easter Tuesday 19 April 1729 ===
The Ich lebe, mein Herze, zu deinem Ergötzen libretto for a cantata for the Third Feast-day of Easter ("Am dritten Oster-Feyertage") was published in Picander's 1728–29 year-cycle of cantata librettos, which was first issued starting with a cantata for an occasion some three months after Easter. If first performed according to the plan of Picander's original publication of the cycle's librettos, BWV 145 premiered on 19 April 1729.

The closing chorale is the fourteenth and final stanza of Nikolaus Herman's Easter hymn "Erschienen ist der herrlich Tag".

=== Preceding movements a and b ===
The five movements on Picander's text seem rather short for the purpose, therefore Alfred Dürr suggests that Bach might have added a sinfonia, as in two cantatas of the period, BWV 174 and 188, admitting that there is no source to substantiate it. Instead, in 19th-century manuscripts of the cantata, the five Picander movements are preceded by two movements:

- BWV 145/a: a four-part setting of the first stanza of Caspar Neumann's hymn "Auf, mein Herz, des Herren Tag" (ca. 1700)
- BWV 145/b: the first movement from the cantata TWV 1:1350 by Georg Philipp Telemann, "So du mit deinem Munde bekennest Jesum", a paraphrase of Romans 10:9.

The two movements may have been added after Bach's death to make the cantata fit to be performed on Easter Sunday. Picander did not refer to the specific readings for the Third Day of Easter in his text. According to Klaus Hofmann, Carl Philipp Emanuel Bach expanded the cantata by the two additional movements in Hamburg (after 1768) and set the first movement himself. In 1787 Carl Philipp Emanuel Bach published the music of that movement as composed by his father (No. 337 in the Breitkopf edition of J. S. Bach's four-part chorales). According to Günther Zedler this sufficiently confirms that the movement was composed by the father. According to Christoph Wolff, the cantata may have been compiled by Carl Friedrich Zelter for the Sing-Akademie zu Berlin.

== Scoring and structure ==
The cantata is scored for three vocal soloists (soprano, tenor and bass), a four-part choir, trumpet, flauto traverso, two oboe d'amore, two violins, viola and basso continuo.

1. Chorale: "Auf, mein Herz, des Herren Tag"
2. Chorus: "So du mit deinem Munde bekennest Jesum" (Telemann)
1. Aria (tenor, soprano): Ich lebe, mein Herze, zu deinem Ergötzen
2. Recitative (tenor): Nun fordre, Moses, wie du willt
3. Aria (bass): Merke, mein Herze, beständig nur dies
4. Recitative (soprano): Mein Jesus lebt
5. Chorale: Drum wir auch billig fröhlich sein

== Music ==
The first added movement is a four-part setting of the chorale stanza. The Telemann movement is in two parts, a duet and a choral fugue, with strings and instruments colla parte and a partly independent trumpet. In Telemann's cantata, it was preceded by an instrumental introduction on the same theme.

The first movement on Picander's text is a duet with obbligato violin. The tenor expresses the position of Jesus "Ich lebe, mein Herze, zu deinem Ergötzen" (I live, my heart, for your pleasure), whereas the soprano answers as the believer: "Du lebest, mein Jesu, zu meinem Ergötzen" (You live, my Jesus, for my pleasure). The movement resembles duets of Bach's secular cantatas and is possibly the parody of an unknown work. It is unusual that Bach has the tenor represent the voice of Jesus. The following secco recitative ends as an arioso to stress the words "Mein Herz, das merke dir!" (My heart, take note!), a thought picked up in the following bass aria, the movement with the richest instrumentation, all instruments but the viola. It has the character of a dance in even periods and may also be a parody of a secular work. The cantata is closed by a four-part setting of the last stanza of the Easter hymn "Erschienen ist der herrlich Tag".

== Recordings ==
- J. S. Bach: Das Kantatenwerk – Sacred Cantatas Vol. 6, Nikolaus Harnoncourt, Tölzer Knabenchor, Concentus Musicus Wien, soloist of the Tölzer Knabenchor, Kurt Equiluz, Thomas Hampson, Teldec 1983
- Die Bach Kantate Vol. 23, Helmuth Rilling, Gächinger Kantorei, Bach-Collegium Stuttgart, Costanza Cuccaro, Adalbert Kraus, Andreas Schmidt, Hänssler 1984
- Bach Edition Vol. 12 – Cantatas Vol. 6, Pieter Jan Leusink, Holland Boys Choir, Netherlands Bach Collegium, Ruth Holton, Nico van der Meel, Bas Ramselaar, Brilliant Classics 1999
- J. S. Bach: Cantatas for the 3rd Sunday of Epiphany, John Eliot Gardiner, Monteverdi Choir, English Baroque Soloists, Angharad Gruffydd Jones, James Gilchrist, Stephen Varcoe, Soli Deo Gloria 2000
- J. S. Bach: Complete Cantatas Vol. 12, Ton Koopman, Amsterdam Baroque Orchestra & Choir, Johannette Zomer, Christoph Prégardien, Klaus Mertens, Antoine Marchand 2000
- J. S. Bach: Cantatas Vol. 32 – BWV 111, 123, 124, 125, Masaaki Suzuki, Bach Collegium Japan, Hana Blažíková, Gerd Türk, Peter Kooy, BIS 2011

== Sources ==
- Ich lebe, mein Herze, zu deinem Ergötzen, BWV 145: Scores at the International Music Score Library Project
- Ich lebe, mein Herze, zu deinem Ergötzen BWV 145; BC A 60; BR‑CPEB Fp‑Inc 6 / Sacred cantata Leipzig University
- Cantata BWV 145 Ich lebe, mein Herze, zu deinem Ergötzen history, scoring, sources for text and music, translations to various languages, discography, discussion, Bach Cantatas Website
- BWV 145 Ich lebe, mein Herze, zu deinem Ergötzen English translation, University of Vermont
- BWV 145 Ich lebe, mein Herze, zu deinem Ergötzen text, scoring, University of Alberta
