= Picander cycle of 1728–29 =

Church cantata cycle

Picander's cycle of 1728–29 is a cycle of church cantata librettos covering the liturgical year. It was published for the first time in 1728 as Cantaten auf die Sonn- und Fest-Tage durch das gantze Jahr (Cantatas for the Sun- and feastdays throughout the year). Johann Sebastian Bach set several of these librettos to music, but it is unknown whether he covered a substantial part of the cycle. This elusive cycle of cantata settings is indicated as the composer's fourth Leipzig cycle, or the Picander cycle (German: Picander Jahrgang).

== Picander's librettos ==
A few questions regarding the collaboration between Bach and Picander regularly return in the scholarly literature on the subject. A first question is when they started to collaborate actively: that may have been as early as 1723 or as late as 1729. Another one is how many Picander texts were set by Bach: apparently as good as nothing from Picander's 1724–25 cycle, and from all other settings, including the St Matthew Passion, no more than around a dozen settings are extant. Finally: how did Bach and Picander get along? Picander was primarily a satirist producing lighthearted poetry, how come that his spiritual poetry, deemed without particular intrinsic qualities, led, when set by Bach, to sacred masterpieces? The collaboration seems unlikely: the serious Bach and the jocular librettist.

According to Bach's biographer Spitta, the composer chose Picander among other poets producing sacred poetry, such as Erdmann Neumeister and Salomon Franck, because Picander had few talents apart from having a swift pen and some affinity with music, that is, he could develop almost anything into lyrics, and so was amenable to producing texts tailored to the composer's expectations. A supposedly cordial relationship between the poet and the composer is illustrated by the fact that Picander's wife became a sponsor to Bach's daughter Johanna Carolina, born in 1737.

Besides, Bach may have been grave in religious matters, he had a humorous side too, for instance illustrated by the quodlibets on popular tunes he produced early in his career (BWV 524) as well as later on (BWV 988/31, 1741). When producing secular cantatas such as Hercules auf dem Scheidewege (1731), the Coffee Cantata, and the 1742 Peasant Cantata, the composer and satirist seem to have been likeminded.

=== Before June 1728 ===
As a student in Leipzig, Picander started to publish satirical poetry in 1722. The earliest evidence of Bach setting part of a text by Picander appears to date from September 1723, for the cantata Bringet dem Herrn Ehre seines Namens, BWV 148, although dating of the cantata is uncertain.

From Advent 1724 Picander started publishing spiritual poetry for the occasions of the liturgical year in weekly installments, some of it however rather secular in content, with a satirical undertone or indulging in self-pity. He continued such publications until the last Sunday after Trinity the next year, at which point he bundled this year cycle of poetry in Sammlung Erbaulicher Gedanken (collection of elevating thoughts), which included lyrics for 68 chorale melodies, and the libretto for a Passion oratorio known as Erbauliche Gedanken auf den Grünen Donnerstag und Charfreitag über den Leidenden Jesum (BWV Anh. 169, not set by Bach). The collection also contained a substantially different version of the libretto of BWV 148.

For the church year 1724–25 Bach was presenting the second half of his second Leipzig cantata cycle and the first half of his third cantata cycle, apparently using none of the Erbauliche Gedanken poetry, nor for his cantatas, nor for his St John Passion, the second version of which he had composed for Good Friday 1725.

One of Picander's secular cantata librettos, Entfliehet, verschwindet, entweichet, ihr Sorgen, however appears to have been set by Bach for presentation in Weißenfels on 23 February 1725 (BWV 249a, a.k.a. Shepherds' Cantata). The lost music of this cantata was linked to the earliest version of Bach's Easter Oratorio, and Picander may have provided the parody text for this music for Easter first performed in 1725. The libretto for that Easter cantata is however unrelated to the poetry for the occasion of Easter published in Picander's 1724–25 cycle.

In August 1725 Bach set another of Picander's secular librettos, Zerreißet, zersprenget, zertrümmert die Gruft, BWV 205, a.k.a. Der zufriedengestellte Aeolus. Later that month Bach set the council election cantata Wünschet Jerusalem Glück, BWV Anh. 4, to a libretto by Picander, but the music of that cantata is lost. Another Picander libretto for a secular cantata is known to have been set by Bach and performed in Kothen, Steigt freudig in die Luft, BWV 36a. This was probably performed in 1726, but the libretto also exists in an earlier version, Schwingt freudig euch empor, BMV 36c, presumably also by Picander.

In 1726 Bach set further librettos by Picander: a secular cantata, Verjaget, zerstreuet, zerrüttet, ihr Sterne, BWV 249b and a church cantata for Michaelmas, Es erhub sich ein Streit, BWV 19. For that sacred work Picander had published a libretto in 1725, but the text used by Bach for his 1726 cantata is an extensively reworked version of the 1725 print. Early 1727 the composer and the librettist appear to have collaborated on further cantatas, and possibly the St Matthew Passion. Later in 1727, and in early 1728, there are two further secular cantatas composed by Bach on a Picander libretto.

=== First publication of the 1728–29 cycle ===
In June 1728 Picander produced the first installment of his 1728–29 cycle of cantata librettos. In its introduction he invited Bach to set the texts. No response of Bach has been recorded to this first set of 16 cantatas. If he set any of the librettos, the music has been completely lost.

Contrary to his 1724–25 cycle the installments were now in quarterly submissions of 16 to 19 cantata librettos each. These also include cantata text not usable in a Leipzig context (cantatas for the periods of Advent and Lent when in Leipzig a tempus clausum was observed), and cantatas for occasions not occurring in the period for which the cycle was planned (e.g. Christmas I and Epiphany VI).

The start of the cycle was exceptional: the publication opened with a libretto for St. John's Day, 24 June 1728, followed by a cantata text for Trinity V, which in 1728 fell on 27 June. Only from the second installment, with cantata texts for occasions from St. Michael's Day (29 September) to the end of the year a few settings by Bach are extant, the oldest of these a setting for Trinity XXI (17 October 1728). Bach's setting of the first cantata of the second installment was only premiered in 1729. In total, for the complete cycle of 70 cantata librettos, nine settings by Bach are known, and only six of these fully extant.

In Lent 1729 at the latest Bach and Picander were collaborating on the St Matthew Passion libretto, which for some movements derived from Picander's 1725 Erbauliche Gedanken publication. It is not known whether the St Matthew Passion was premiered in 1727 or 1729.

=== Further publications and republications ===
From 1727 Picander was publishing his Ernst-Schertzhaffte und Satyrische Gedichte, large collections of serious, jocular and satirical poetry. All of its volumes, most of these reprinted several times, and reworked editions, up to its fifth and last volume published in 1751, contained poetry set by Bach, both sacred and secular compositions.

The complete 1728–29 cantata cycle was republished in Volume III of the Ernst-Schertzhaffte und Satyrische Gedichte, pp. 79–188, but now starting with the cantata libretto for Advent I, and with 1729 as the year indicated for the cycle. The volume contained several texts set by Bach, including secular cantatas and the libretto for the St Mark Passion, BWV 247, which Bach had set in 1731. Volume III was reprinted in 1737. After the early 1730s there is only one extant Bach composition with a libretto that also appeared in one of Picander's poetry collections: the Peasant Cantata of 1742.

== Cantatas ==
An ideal cycle including all cantatas for Advent and Lent, but without counting Passion music for Good Friday nor music for the installation of a new council, would have 73 cantatas. Picander's 1728–29 cycle has 70. The difference is accounted for thus:

- No separate cantata for Palm Sunday: for this feast day Picander proposes to use the same cantata text as for Advent I.
- No (separate) cantata for Reformation Day. In the cycle proposed for 1728–29 the feast of Reformation Day coincided with Trinity XXIII (31 October 1728), however without Picander making any reference to that feast day in the title of the cantata for that Sunday.
- No cantata for Trinity XXVII, which didn't occur in 1728.

For all other possible occasions from St. John's Day 24 June 1728 to Trinity IV 4 July 1729 Picander provided a specific cantata text, whether or not the occasion occurred in the intended period, and whether or not providing music for the occasion was customary in Leipzig. Apart from the text for the Annunciation cantata which was placed after the text for Judica Sunday as last libretto for the third section, the sequence of cantata texts as printed in 1728 follows the occurrence of occasions for this period, with the Christmas I and Epiphany VI cantatas inserted at appropriate points.

	Occasion	Libretto	1728–29	1732	BWV BDW
1	Advent I	Machet die Thore weit (Psalm 24:7)	II/10 (28 November 1728)	79–81	
2	Advent II	Erwache doch mein Herze	II/11 (5 December 1728)	81–82	
3	Advent III	Alle Plagen, alle Pein	II/12 (12 December 1728)	83–84	
4	Advent IV	Vergiß es, doch, mein Herze, nicht	II/13 (19 December 1728)	84–85	
5	Christmas	Ehre sey Gott in der Höhe (Luke 2:14) "Ehre sei Gott in der Höhe"	II/14 – 25 December 1728	85–87	197a 00245
6	Christmas 2	Kehret wieder, kommt zurücke	II/15 (26 December 1728)	87–89	
7	Christmas 3	Ich bin in dich entzündt	II/16 (27 December 1728)	89–90	
8	Christmas I	Niemand kan die Lieb ergründen	II/17 (28–31 December)	90–91	
9	New Year	Gott, wie dein Nahme, so ist auch dein Ruhm (Psalm 48:11) "Gott, wie dein Name, so ist auch dein Ruhm"	III/1 – 1 January 1729	92–93	171; 00206
10	New Year I	Steh auf, mein Herz	III/2 (2 January 1729)	93–95	
11	Epiphany	Dieses ist der tag (Psalm 118:24–25)	III/3 (6 January 1729)	95–97	
12	Epiphany I	Ich bin betrübt	III/4 (9 January 1729)	97–99	
13	Epiphany II	Ich hab in mir ein fröhlich Herze	III/5 (16 January 1729)	99–100	
14	Epiphany III	Ich steh mit einem Fuß im Grabe (Psalm 48:11) "Ich steh mit einem Fuß im Grabe"	III/6 – 23 January 1729	100–102	156; 00190
15	Epiphany IV	Wie bist du doch in mir	III/7 (30 January 1729)	102–103	
16	Purification	Herr, nun lässest du deinen Diener in Friede fahren (Luke 2:29)	III/8 (2 February 1729)	104–105	
17	Epiphany V	Erwache, du verschlaffnes Herze	III/9 (6 February 1729)	105–106	
18	Epiphany VI	Valet will ich dir geben	III/10 —	106–108	
19	Septuagesima	Ich bin vergnügt mit meinem Stande	III/11 (13 February 1729)	108–110	
20	Sexagesima	Sey getreu biß in den Tod	III/12 (20 February 1729)	110–111	
21	Estomihi	Sehet! Wir gehen hinauf, gen Jerusalem "Sehet, wir gehn hinauf gen Jerusalem"	III/13 – 27 February 1729	111–113	159; 00193
22	Invocabit	Weg, mein Herz, mit den Gedanken	III/14 (6 March 1729)	114–115	
23	Reminiscere	Ich stürme den Himmel mit meinem Gebethe	III/15 (13 March 1729)	115–116	
24	Oculi	Schliesse dich, mein Herze zu	III/16 (20 March 1729)	116–118	
25	Laetare	Wer nur den lieben Gott läßt walten	III/17 (27 March 1729)	118–119	
26	Judica	Böse Welt, schmäh immerhin	III/18 (3 April 1729)	119–120	
27	Annunciation	Der Herr ist mit mir, darum fürchte ich mich nicht (Psalm 118:6)	III/19 (25 March 1729)	120–121	
1	Palm Sunday	Machet die Thore weit (Psalm 24:7)	— (10 April 1729)	121	
28	Easter	Es hat überwunden der Löwe, der Held	IV/1 (17 April 1729)	122–123	
29	Easter 2	Ich bin ein Pilgrim auf der Welt "Ich bin ein Pilgrim auf der Welt"	IV/2 – 18 April 1729	123–124	Anh. 190; 01501
30	Easter 3	Ich lebe, mein Herze, zu deinem Ergötzen "Ich lebe, mein Herze, zu deinem Ergötzen"	IV/3 – 19 April 1729	125–126	145; 00177
31	Quasimodogeniti	Welt, behalte du das deine	IV/4 (24 April 1729)	126–127	
32	Misericordias Domini	Ich kan mich besser nicht versorgen	IV/5 (1 May 1729)	128–129	
33	Jubilate	Faße dich betrübter Sinn	IV/6 (8 May 1729)	129–131	
34	Cantate	Ja! Ja! Ich bin nun ganz verlassen	IV/7 (15 May 1729)	131–133	
35	Rogate	Ich Schreye laut mit meiner Stimme	IV/8 (22 May 1729)	133–134	
36	Ascension	Alles, alles Himmel-werts	IV/9 (26 May 1729)	134–136	
37	Exaudi	Quäle dich nur nicht, mein Herz	IV/10 (29 May 1729)	136–137	
38	Pentecost	Raset und brauset ihr hefftigen Winde	IV/11 (5 June 1729)	138–139	
39	Pentecost 2	Ich liebe den Höchsten von ganzen Gemüthe "Ich liebe den Höchsten von ganzem Gemüte"	IV/12 – 6 June 1729	139–140	174; 00212
40	Pentecost 3	Ich klopff an deine Gnaden-Thüre	IV/13 (7 June 1729)	141–142	
41	Trinity	Gott will mich in den Himmel haben	IV/14 (12 June 1729)	142–143	
42	Trinity I	Welt, dein Purpur stinckt mich an	IV/15 (19 June 1729)	143–145	
43	Trinity II	Kommt, eilet, ihr Gäste, zum seligen Mahle	IV/16 (26 June 1729)	145–146	
44	Trinity III	Wohin? mein Herz	IV/17 (3 July 1729)	147–148	
45	Trinity IV	Laß sie spotten, laß sie lachen	IV/18 (10 July 1729)	148–150	
46	Johannis	Gelobet sey der Herr (Luke 1:68–69)	I/1 (24 June 1728)	150–151	
47	Trinity V	In allen meinen thaten	I/2 (27 June 1728)	152–153	
48	Visitation	Meine Seele erhebt den Herrn (Luke 1:47)	I/3 (2 July 1728)	153–155	
49	Trinity VI	Gott, gieb mir ein versöhnlich Herze	I/4 (4 July 1728)	155–156	
50	Trinity VII	Ach Gott! ich bin von dir	I/5 (11 July 1728)	156–158	
51	Trinity VIII	Herr, stärcke meinen schwachen Glauben	I/6 (18 July 1728)	158–160	
52	Trinity IX	Mein Jesu, was meine	I/7 (25 July 1728)	160–161	
53	Trinity X	Laßt meine Thränen euch bewegen	I/8 (1 August 1728)	161–162	
54	Trinity XI	Ich scheue mich	I/9 (8 August 1728)	163–164	
55	Trinity XII	Ich bin wie einer, der nicht höret	I/10 (15 August 1728)	164–165	
56	Trinity XIII	Können meine nasse Wangen	I/11 (22 August 1728)	165–167	
57	Trinity XIV	Schöpffer aller Dinge	I/12 (29 August 1728)	167–169	
58	Trinity XV	Arm, und dennoch frölich seyn	I/13 (5 September 1728)	169–170	
59	Trinity XVI	Schließet euch, ihr müden Augen	I/14 (12 September 1728)	170–172	
60	Trinity XVII	Stolz und Pracht	I/15 (19 September 1728)	172–173	
61	Trinity XVIII	Ich liebe Gott vor allen Dingen	I/16 (26 September 1728)	173–174	
62	Michaelis	Man singet mit Freuden vom Sieg (Psalm 118:15–16) "Man singet mit Freuden vom Sieg"	II/1 (29 September 1728); 29 September 1729	175–176	149/1a?; 149; 01509; 00183
63	Trinity XIX	Gott, du Richter der Gedancken	II/2 (3 October 1728); 23 October 1729?	176–178	1137? 01309
64	Trinity XX	Ach ruffe mich bald	II/3 (10 October 1728)	178–179	
65	Trinity XXI	Ich habe meine Zuversicht "Ich habe meine Zuversicht"	II/4 – 17 October 1728	179–181	188; 00228
66	Trinity XXII	Gedult, mein Gott, Gedult	II/5 (24 October 1728)	181–182	
67	Trinity XXIII (Reformation Day)	Schnöde Schönheit dieser Welt	II/6 (31 October 1728)	182–184	
68	Trinity XXIV	Küsse mein Herze, mit Freuden die Ruthe	II/7 (7 November 1728)	184–185	
69	Trinity XXV	Eile, rette deine Seele	II/8 (14 November 1728)	185–187	
70	Trinity XXVI	Kömmt denn nicht mein Jesus bald?	II/9 (21 November 1728)	187–188	
—	Trinity XXVII	—	—	—	

Known settings of the cycle's librettos by Bach (or his son Carl Philipp Emanuel) in the 1728–29 period:

- 17 October 1728 (for Trinity XXI): Ich habe meine Zuversicht, BWV 188
- 25 December 1728 (for Christmas): Ehre sei Gott in der Höhe, BWV 197a (incomplete)
- 1 January 1729 (for New Year): Gott, wie dein Name, so ist auch dein Ruhm, BWV 171. At least three movements are parodies.
- 23 January 1729 (for Epiphany III): Ich steh mit einem Fuß im Grabe, BWV 156
- 27 February 1729 (for Estomihi): Sehet, wir gehn hinauf gen Jerusalem, BWV 159
- 18 April 1729 (for Easter Monday): Ich bin ein Pilgrim auf der Welt, BWV Anh. 190. Fragment of a setting of No. 4 (Aria) of this libretto by J. S. or C. P. E. Bach.
- 19 April 1729 (for Easter Tuesday): Ich lebe, mein Herze, zu deinem Ergötzen, BWV 145. Composed by J. S. or C. P. E. Bach. Contains a chorus by Telemann, TWV 1:1350.
- 6 June 1729 (for Whit Monday): Ich liebe den Höchsten von ganzem Gemüte, BWV 174.
- 29 September 1729 (for St. Michael's Day): Man singet mit Freuden vom Sieg, BWV 149. Composed a year after the date intended for the cantata text in Picanders first print. BWV 149/1a (formerly BWV Anh. 198), an instrumental sinfonia for an abandoned cantata, is seen as Bach's first attempt to set Picander's libretto for St. Michael's Day as included in the cycle.
- 23 October 1729? (for the 19th Sunday after Trinity): a draft of six bars, BWV 1137 (formerly BWV Anh. 2), is maybe all that is left of Bach's setting of the Gott, du Richter der Gedanken libretto Picander wrote for that occasion.

None of Bach's extant settings of the cycle's librettos are for occasions not occurring in the period intended for the cycle (24 June 1728 to 4 July 1729), nor are there any settings by Bach from the cycle's texts for cantatas falling in Leipzig's tempus clausum. For the period from St. John's Day 1728 to Trinity IV 1729 there also appear to be no settings by Bach of cantatas for the liturgical year on texts outside Picander's cycle. In the same period Bach collaborated with Picander on several other projects, such as the secular cantata O angenehme Melodei, BWV 210a (12 January 1729), the wedding cantata Der Herr ist freundlich dem, der auf ihn harret, BWV Anh. 211 (18 January 1729) and Klagt, Kinder, klagt es aller Welt, BWV 244a a cantata for a memorial service of Leopold, Prince of Anhalt-Köthen (performed a few months after the Prince's death on 24 March 1729). It remains however uncertain whether the St Matthew Passion, with some of its music overlapping with that commemorative cantata and composed on a libretto by Picander, was premiered or performed on Good Friday 15 April 1729.

== Reception ==
Reconstructions and completions based on extant music by Bach include:

- (Judica): Böse Welt, schmäh immerhin, based on BWV 209 by Gustav Adolf Theill, published in 1983 (OCLC 159405685).

Known settings by other composers:

- (Septuagesima): Ich bin vergnügt mit meinem Stande, first three movements set by C. P. E. Bach, c.1733–34 (BDW 09341)
- (Pentecost): Raset und brauset ihr hefftigen Winde, set by Johann Friedrich Doles in 1740, when a student of Bach.
- (Epiphany): Diß ist der tag, den der Herr gemacht hat, RoemV 154, by Johann Theodor Roemhildt.

== Sources ==
- Pfau, Marc-Roderich (2008). "Ein unbekanntes Leipziger Kantatentextheft aus dem Jahr 1735: Neues zum Thema Bach und Stölzel" [An unknown Leipzig cantata text publication from the year 1735: News regarding Bach and Stölzel]. In Wollny, Peter (ed.). Bach-Jahrbuch 2008 [Bach Yearbook 2008]. Bach-Jahrbuch (in German). Vol. 94. Neue Bachgesellschaft. Leipzig: Evangelische Verlagsanstalt. pp. 99–122. doi:10.13141/bjb.v2008. ISBN 978-3-374-02668-5. ISSN 0084-7682.

Church cantatas by Johann Sebastian Bach by chronology
Preceded by Bach's third cantata cycle	Bach's fourth cantata cycle 1728–29	Succeeded by Bach's later cantatas
