= Es erhub sich ein Streit, BWV 19 =

Church cantata by Johann Sebastian Bach

Es erhub sich ein Streit
- BWV 19
- Church cantata by J. S. Bach
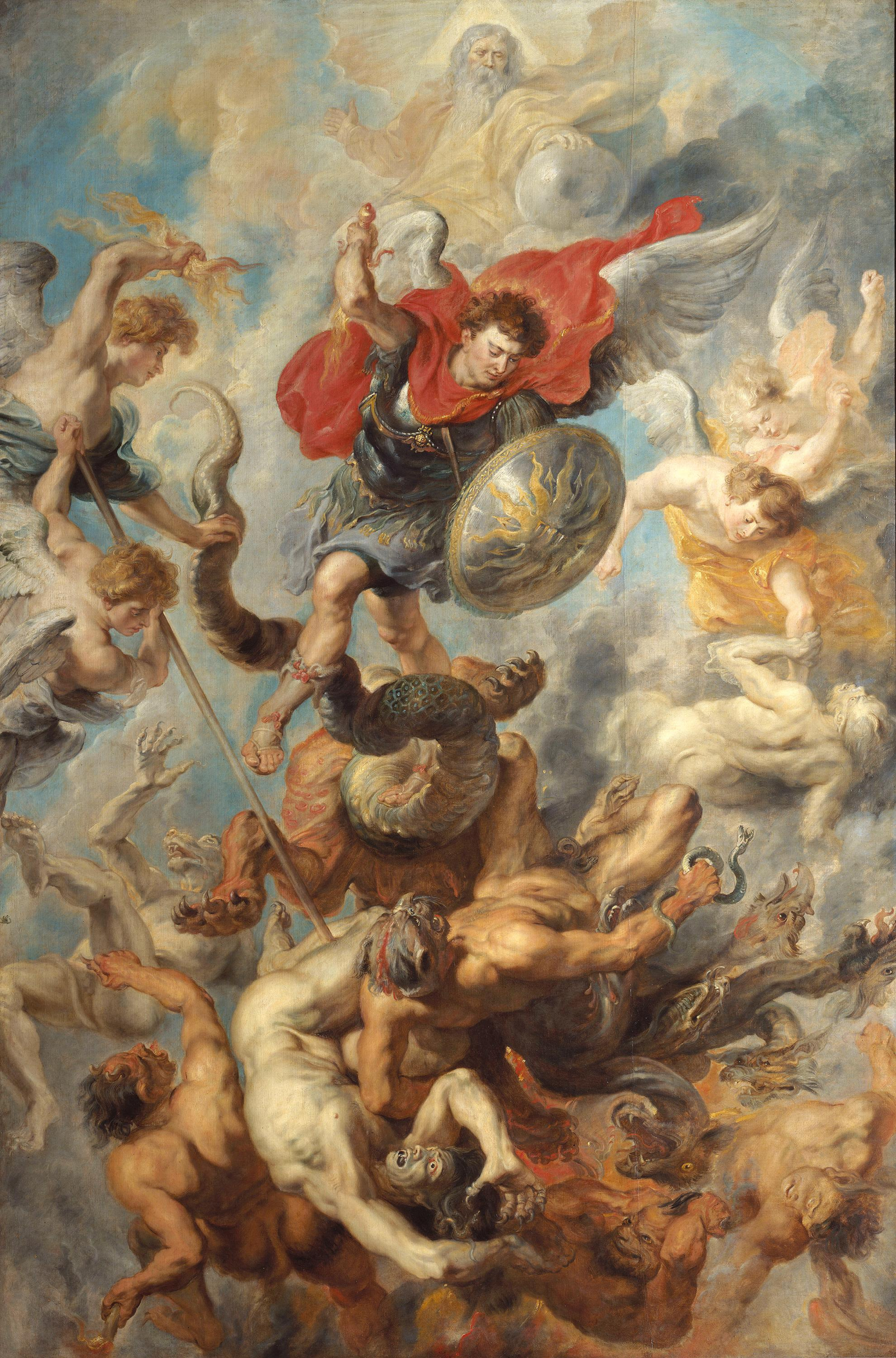
- The Fall of the Rebel Angels, 17th century
- Occasion: Feast of Saint Michael
- Cantata text: Picander, revised
- Chorale: "Herzlich lieb hab ich dich, o Herr"; "Freu dich sehr, o meine Seele"
- Performed: 29 September 1726: Leipzig
- Movements: 7
- Vocal: SATB
- Instrumental: 3 trombe; timpani; 2 oboes; oboe da caccia; 2 oboes d'amore; 2 violins; viola; continuo

Es erhub sich ein Streit (A struggle arose), BWV 19, is a church cantata by Johann Sebastian Bach. He composed it in Leipzig in 1726 for the Feast of Saint Michael and first performed it on 29 September that year. It is the second of his three extant cantatas for this feast, which also marked the start of an annual trade fair in Leipzig.

The text was originally written by Picander and published in Leipzig in 1725. The expanded text that Bach actually used appeared in a 1728 cantata collection by Christoph Birkmann in Nuremberg. The cantata is structured in seven movements, with two choral movements framing a sequence of alternating recitatives and arias. The closing chorale is taken from the hymn "Freu dich sehr, o meine Seele". The cantata is scored for soprano, tenor and bass vocal soloists, a four-part choir, and a Baroque instrumental ensemble of three trumpets and timpani, three kinds of oboes, strings and basso continuo. The opening chorus begins with immediacy without an instrumental introduction and depicts in its opening and closing section an agitated battle. The cantata's longest movement is a tenor aria as a pensive response, to which a trumpet plays the complete melody of Martin Schalling's hymn "Herzlich lieb hab ich dich, o Herr". A chorale in a dance-like triple meter closes the work. Bach's sons Wilhelm Friedemann Bach and Carl Philipp Emanuel Bach later performed parts of the cantata.

== History and words ==
Bach took up his position in Leipzig in 1723. His first two years in the city were particularly productive in terms of cantatas for the church calendar. St. Michael's Day was important in Leipzig both as a high Christian holiday, like Christmas and Easter, but also as the start of one of the city's annual trade fairs.

The prescribed readings for the day were from the Book of Revelation, Michael fighting the dragon (Revelation 12:7–12), and from the Gospel of Matthew, heaven belongs to the children, the angels see the face of God (Matthew 18:1–11). The text of the cantata is based on a poem in seven stanzas by Christian Friedrich Henrici, better known as Picander, who published it in Leipzig in 1725 in his collection Sammlung Erbaulicher Gedancken über und auf die gewöhnlichen Sonn- und Fest-Tage Leipzig. Picander had become by then a regular collaborator of the composer, who had also provided the libretto for a previous St. Michael's Day cantata. The text that Bach actually used for the cantata, expands this model and appears in a cantata collection by Christoph Birkmann in Nuremberg in 1728, Gott-geheiligte Sabbaths-Zehnden; Birkmann may have been the poet who made the changes. The text has two new movements in the beginning that paraphrase the prescribed reading. The third movement alludes to the rescue of Elisha. The first line of the fourth movement is taken from Psalm 8:4 and a similar idea in Psalm 144:3. The last three movements are prayers for angelic help at the end of life, with an allusion to Elijah's chariot. The closing chorale is the ninth stanza from the hymn "Freu dich sehr, o meine Seele", published by Christoph Demantius in 1620. The cantata is regarded as part of Bach's third cantata cycle.

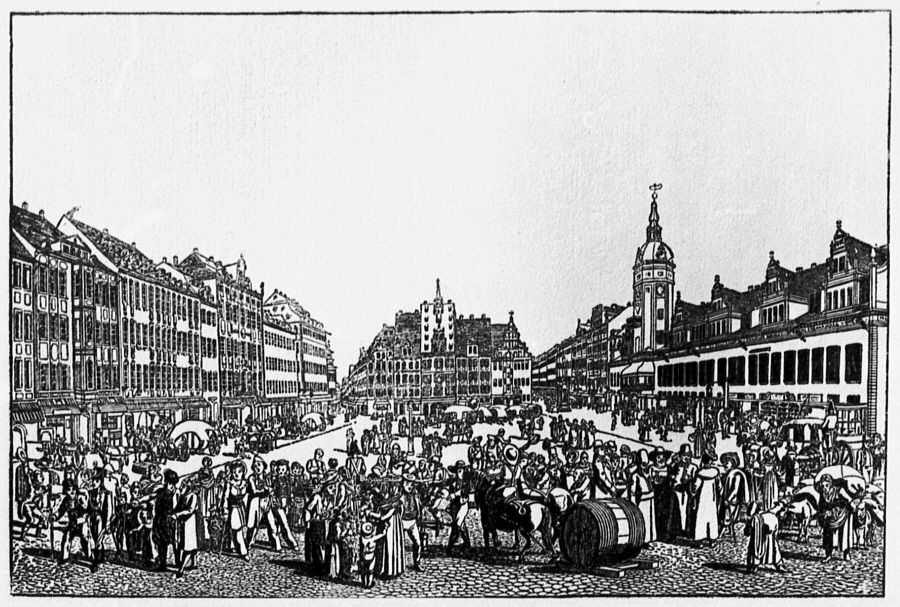
Leipzig fair at the market square next to the Nikolaikirche, c. 1800

Bach led the Thomanerchor in the first performances on 29 September 1726, a morning service at the Nikolaikirche, with a sermon given by Friedrich Wilhelm Schütz, and a vespers service at the Thomaskirche where Urban Gottfried Sieber held the sermon. In the first performances, movements 4 and 5 were possibly not performed, because they are in brackets in all parts, and the bass is not figured.

Further performances by Bach are not documented because the carefully revised material made no changes necessary. The cantata was popular in the 18th century; Bach's son Wilhelm Friedemann Bach conducted a performance in Halle around 1752, with a revised third movement. Bach's son Carl Philipp Emanuel Bach used parts of it, omitting the arias, for a pastiche that he performed in Hamburg first in 1770. Several copies of the opening movement from the 18th and 19th centuries are extant.

== Music ==
=== Structure and scoring ===
Es erhub sich ein Streit is scored for three vocal soloists (soprano (S), tenor (T), and bass (B)), a four-part choir, and a Baroque instrumental ensemble of three trumpets (Tr), timpani, two oboes (Ob), two oboes d'amore (Oa), taille (Ta), two violins (Vl), viola (Va), and basso continuo. During Bach's time in Leipzig, he always used the largest orchestra available for the celebrations of the Feast of St Michael. All complete Bach cantatas for this occasion include trumpet and timpani. The Bach scholar Alfred Dürr gave the duration as c. 22 minutes.

Bach structured the cantata in seven movements. In the following table, the scoring is based on the Neue Bach-Ausgabe. The keys and time signatures are taken from Dürr, using the symbol for common time (4/4). The continuo, playing throughout, and the timpani, playing always with the trumpets, are not listed.

Movements of Es erhub sich ein Streit
No.	Title	Text	Type	Vocal	Brass	Winds	Key	Time	
1	Es erhub sich ein Streit	Picander	Chorus	SATB	3Tr	2Ob Ta	2Vl Va	C major	6/8
2	Gottlob! der Drache liegt	Picander	Recitative	B					common time
3	Gott schickt uns Mahanaim zu	Picander	Aria	S		2Oa		G major	common time
4	Was ist der schnöde Mensch, das Erdenkind?	Picander	Recitative	T			2Vl Va	E minor	common time
5	Bleibt, ihr Engel, bleibt bei mir!	Picander	Aria	T	Tr		2Vl Va	E minor	6/8
6	Laßt uns das Angesicht	Picander	Recitative	S					common time
7	Laß dein' Engel mit mir fahren	Demantius	Chorale	SATB	3Tr	2Ob Ta	2Vl Va	C major	3/4

== Movements ==
=== 1 ===
Dürr regards the movement "Es erhub sich ein Streit" (A struggle arose), as "one of the most monumental opening choruses in all Bach's cantatas". It begins without an instrumental introduction, creating what the musicologist Julian Mincham terms an "immediate dramatic effect". Dürr points out that Bach set a text paraphrased from the Bible, and therefore did not use motet style as was usually done for Biblical quotation. Instead he chose a da capo form, with a fugal development in the outer sections and more homophonic music in the middle section. Throughout the movement, the instruments play independent thematic material. The conductor Craig Smith suggests that the "vaulting high-energy fugue theme is the perfect illustration of the heroic struggle".

=== 2 ===
A secco recitative for bass, "Gottlob! der Drache liegt" (Praise God! The dragon is prone.), describes in syllabic declamation the victory, but warns that the dragon is conquered but not destroyed.

=== 3 ===
The third movement is a soprano aria with obbligato oboes, "Gott schickt uns Mahanaim zu;" (God sends Mahanaim to us), According to Mincham, it is "an oasis of protective tranquillity" in the major mode. However, elements of the music disturb the peace conveyed by the text: the extended ritornello begins with an "odd three-bar phrasing", leading into a passage of constant momentum between the two oboes. Dürr notes that Bach used figures to illustrate the text, such as long notes for "standing" and "repose", and fast notes for "going".

=== 4 ===
The tenor recitative, "Was ist der schnöde Mensch, das Erdenkind?" (What is foolish humanity, child of the earth?), is again in the minor mode, reflecting the fragility of man. It is accompanied by the strings, but the declamation is syllabic, as in the first recitative.

=== 5 ===
The tenor aria, "Bleibt, ihr Engel, bleibt bei mir!" (Stay, you angels, stay with me!), expresses a personal response to the text. The aria is the longest movement of the cantata, representing a third of the total length of the work. The strings and continuo play a Siciliano that Albert Schweitzer called the "angel rhythm". The trumpet plays the full chorale melody of "Herzlich lieb hab ich dich, o Herr", probably with the third stanza mentioning angels in mind: "Ach, Herr, laß dein lieb Engelein" (Ah, Lord, let your dear little angel), the chorale that concludes Bach's St. John Passion.

=== 6 ===
The penultimate movement, "Laßt uns das Angesicht der frommen Engel lieben" (Let us love the countenance of holy angels), is a brief secco recitative for the soprano that returns to the major mode to prepare the closing chorale.

=== 7 ===
The chorale, "Laß dein' Engel mit mir fahren auf Elias Wagen rot" (Let your angels travel with me on Elijah's red chariot), uses the traditional melody of the hymn, but in a triple metre. It has the feel of a minuet, although there is some tension because of the changing phrase lengths employed by the melody.

== Manuscripts and publication ==
Both the autograph manuscript of the score and a complete set of 19 parts are extant. Unusually for Bach's third cantata cycle, Bach carefully revised the parts. As with almost all Bach cantatas, the music did not appear in print until the 19th century. It was first published in 1852 in the Bach-Gesellschaft Ausgabe (BGA), edited by Moritz Hauptmann. In the Neue Bach Ausgabe (NBA), it was published in 1973, edited by Marianne Helms.

== Recordings ==
The following table is a selection from the Bach Cantatas website, where 37 recordings are listed as of 2026. Instrumental groups playing period instruments in historically informed performances are marked by green background under the header "Instr.".

Recordings of Es erhub sich ein Streit
Title	Conductor / Choir / Orchestra	Soloists	Label	Year	Instr.
J. S. Bach: Cantatas BWV 1 & BWV 19	Fritz Lehmann Berliner Motettenchor Berliner Philharmoniker	Gunthild Weber; Helmut Krebs; Hermann Schey	Deutsche Grammophon	1951	
J. S. Bach: Cantatas BWV 6 & BWV 19	Hans Grischkat Stuttgart Choral Society Bach-Orchester Stuttgart	Agnes Giebel; Klaus Stemann; Bruno Müller	Renaissance X-34	1951	
Les Grandes Cantates de J. S. Bach Vol. 2	Fritz Werner Heinrich-Schütz-Chor Heilbronn Pforzheim Chamber Orchestra	Edith Selig; Georg Jelden; Jakob Stämpfli	Erato	1964	
Die Bach Kantate Vol. 18	Helmuth Rilling Gächinger Kantorei Bach-Collegium Stuttgart	Barbara Rondelli; Adalbert Kraus; Siegmund Nimsgern	Hänssler	1971	
J. S. Bach: Das Kantatenwerk • Complete Cantatas • Les Cantates, Folge / Vol. 5 – BWV 17-20	Nikolaus Harnoncourt: Wiener Sängerknaben; Chorus Viennensis; Concentus Musicus Wien	soloist of the Wiener Sängerknaben; Kurt Equiluz; Max van Egmond	Teldec	1971	Period
Bach Edition Vol. 21 – Cantatas Vol. 12	Pieter Jan Leusink Holland Boys Choir Netherlands Bach Collegium	Ruth Holton; Nico van der Meel; Bas Ramselaar	Brilliant Classics	2000	Period
Bach Cantatas Vol. 74: Ambronay/Bremen	John Eliot Gardiner Monteverdi Choir English Baroque Soloists	Malin Hartelius; James Gilchrist; Peter Harvey	Soli Deo Gloria	2000	Period
J. S. Bach: Complete Cantatas Vol. 17	Ton Koopman Amsterdam Baroque Orchestra & Choir	Sandrine Piau; Jörg Dürmüller; Klaus Mertens	Antoine Marchand	2003	Period
J. S. Bach: Cantatas Vol. 46	Masaaki Suzuki Bach Collegium Japan	Hana Blažíková; Gerd Türk; Peter Kooy	BIS	2009	Period
J. S. Bach: Kantate "Es erhub sich ein Streit", BWV 019 / Michaelisfest	Rudolf Lutz Vocal ensemble of Schola Seconda Pratica Schola Seconda Pratica	Julia Doyle; Georg Poplutz; Daniel Pérez	Gallus Media	2022	Period
J. S. Bach: Es erhub sich ein Streit	Shunske Sato Netherlands Bach Society	Rachel Redmond; Daniel Johannsen; Matthew Baker	Channel Classics Records	2022	Period
