= Man singet mit Freuden vom Sieg, BWV 149 =

Church cantata by Johann Sebastian Bach

Man singet mit Freuden vom Sieg
- BWV 149
- Church cantata by J. S. Bach
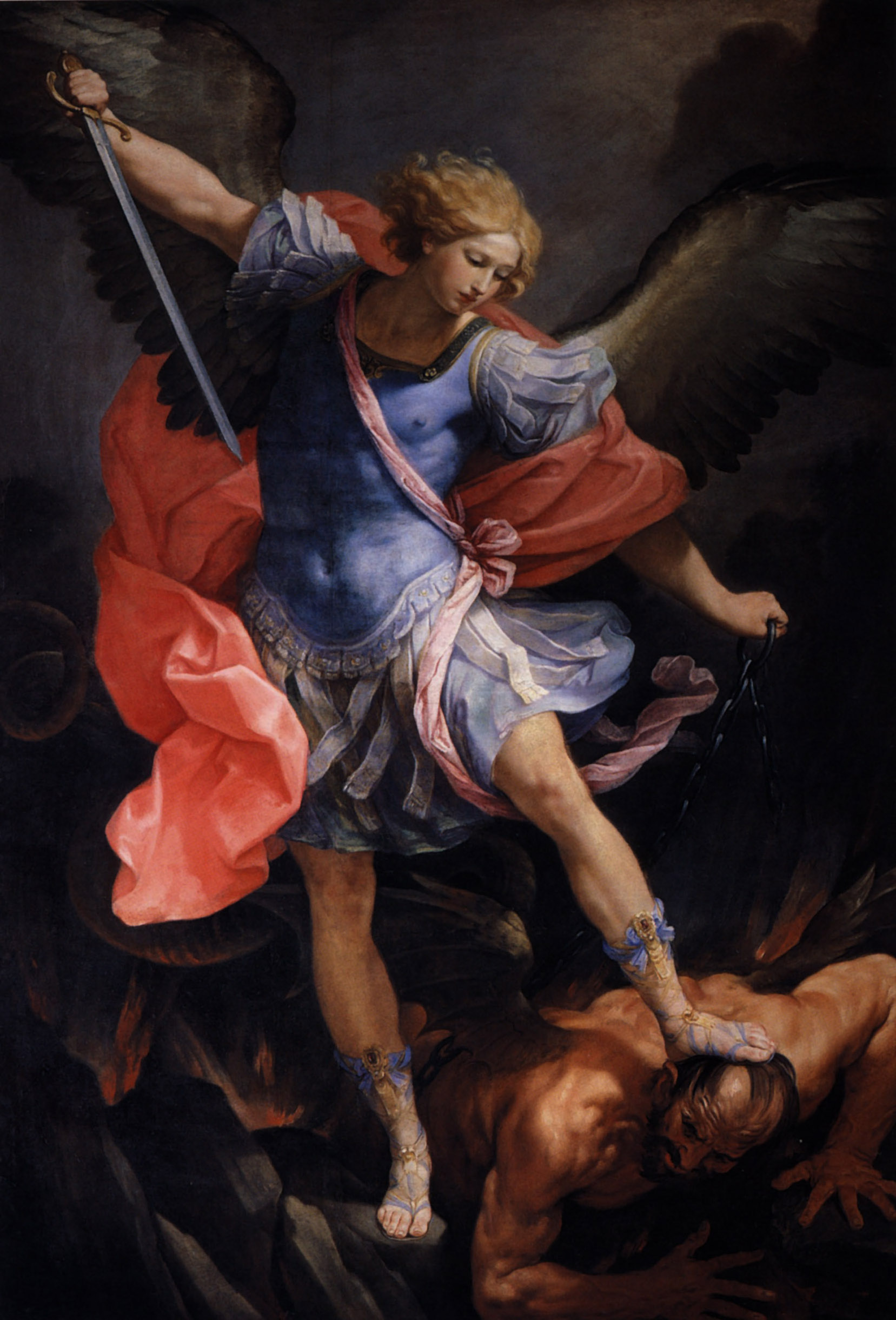
- Michael, the archangel, by Guido Reni, Santa Maria della Concezione, Rome, 1636
- Occasion: Feast of Saint Michael
- Cantata text: Picander
- Bible text: Psalms 118:15–16
- Chorale: "Herzlich lieb hab ich dich, o Herr"
- Performed: 29 September 1728/9: Leipzig
- Movements: 7
- Vocal: SATB choir and solo
- Instrumental: Trumpets; timpani; oboes; bassoon; strings

Man singet mit Freuden vom Sieg (lit.: One sings with joy about victory), BWV 149, is a church cantata by Johann Sebastian Bach. He composed the work in Leipzig for Michaelmas and first performed it in 1728 or 1729. It is the last of his three extant cantatas for the feast.

Picander wrote the cantata's libretto, and published it in a 1728/29 cycle of cantata texts. The libretto opens with two verses from Psalm 118 and closes with the third stanza of Martin Schalling's "Herzlich lieb hab ich dich, o Herr". The topic of the libretto aligns with the prescribed readings for the day from the Book of Revelation, Michael fighting the dragon. The closing Lutheran hymn stanza writes about a "sweet little angel", accompanying a soul in anticipation of the Last Judgment.

The cantata has seven movements, and is scored festively with four vocal parts and a Baroque orchestra of three trumpets, timpani, three oboes, bassoon, strings and continuo. Bach derived the music of the opening chorus from his Hunting Cantata, composed already in 1713.

== History and text ==
Bach composed the cantata in Leipzig for the feast of St. Michael (Michaelmas); it is his third and last of his extant cantatas for the feast, a feast celebrating the archangel and all angels. The prescribed readings for St. Michael's Day were from the Book of Revelation, Michael fighting the dragon (Revelation 12:7–12), and from the Gospel of Matthew, heaven belongs to the children and the angels see the face of God (Matthew 18:1–11). St. Michael, the archangel, has a prominent position in Lutheranism, as in Judaism. John Eliot Gardiner, who conducted all of Bach's church cantatas in 2000 on the Bach Cantata Pilgrimage, notes that the Sanctus, composed for Christmas 1724 in close relation to the text by Isaiah, and much later integrated to Bach's Mass in B minor, shows the relevance of angels for Bach's Lutheranism.

The libretto was written by Christian Friedrich Henrici, better known as Picander, Bach began to work with him in 1725, and they collaborated notably on the major St Matthew Passion. Picander wrote his cantata texts, including this one, with Bach as the composer in mind. The poet included as the first movement two verses from a psalm (Psalms 118:15–16) and as the closing chorale the third stanza of Martin Schalling's hymn "Herzlich lieb hab ich dich, o Herr". The Bach scholar Klaus Hofmann notes that battle scenes were often depicted in art and music. In the opening lines taken from a psalm, the battle of Michael against Satan is already won. Satan is mentioned only in the first movement. A focus of the later sequence of alternating arias and recitatives is on guardian angels seen as "holy watchmen". The libretto was published in the 1728/29 year of his collection Ernstschertzhaffte und satyrische Gedichte / Cantaten auf die Sonn- und Fest-Tage. They appeared in quarterly volumes to help the congregation following the text.

Bach led the Thomanerchor in the first performance of the cantata in Leipzig on 29 September, either in 1728 or 1729.

== Scoring and structure ==
Bach structured the cantata in seven movements and scored it for four vocal soloists (soprano (S), alto (A), tenor (T) and bass (B)), a four-part choir, and a Baroque orchestra of three trumpets (Tr), timpani (Ti), three oboes (Ob), two violins (Vl), violas (Va), bassoon (Fg), violone (Vo), and basso continuo (Bc). The title of the autograph score reads simply: "J.N.J. Festo Michaelis. / Man singet mit Freuden etc. di I.S.Bach."

In the following table of the movements, the scoring and keys follow the Neue Bach-Ausgabe. The time signature is provided using the symbol for common time (4/4). The continuo, playing throughout, is not shown.

Movements of Man singet mit Freuden vom Sieg, BWV 149
No.	Title	Text	Type	Vocal	Brass	Woods	Strings	Key	Time.
1	Man singet mit Freuden vom Sieg	Psalm	Chorus	SATB	3Tr Ti	3Ob Fg	2Vl Va	D major	3/8
2	Kraft und Stärke sei gesungen	Picander	Aria	B			Vo		common time
3	Ich fürchte mich	Picander	Recitative	A					common time
4	Gottes Engel weichen nie	Picander	Aria	S			2Vl Va	A major	3/8
5	Ich danke dir	Picander	Recitative	T					common time
6	Seid wachsam, ihr heiligen Wächter	Picander	Aria	A T		Fg		G major	common time
7	Ach Herr, lass dein lieb Engelein	Schalling	Chorale	SATB	3Tr Ti	3Ob Fg	2Vl Va	C major	common time

== Music ==
=== 1 ===
Bach based the music of the opening chorus, "Man singet mit Freuden vom Sieg" (There are joyful songs of victory), on the final movement of his secular Hunting Cantata, which had been his first cantata using "modern" recitatives and arias in 1713. The polyphonic movement is described by Simon Crouch as being a "high-octane start". Gardiner notes that in comparison to earlier works for the same occasion, this movement is "festive rather than combative". Bach reworked the earlier movement considerably to adjust from the court music context to joyful songs of victory: he replaced two horns with three trumpets and timpani, transposed the music from F major to D major, and expanded it "on every level", as Hofmann notes. The beginning of a different setting of the text hints that the idea to use the early music as a base was not planned from the start.

=== 2 ===
The bass aria, "Kraft und Stärke sei gesungen" (Power and strength be sung), is accompanied by two low instrumental melodies. It examines the conflict between God and Satan, and includes a very active continuo to represent "the fury of the battle". The imagery of a "great voice", as mentioned in the Book of Revelation, is used, announcing the Lamb "that has defeated and banished Satan".

=== 3 ===
A short alto recitative, "Ich fürchte mich vor tausend Feinden nicht" (I don't fear thousand enemies), was described as "tonally unstable".

=== 4 ===
The soprano aria, "Gottes Engel weichen nie" (God's angels never yield), is lyrical and dancing. The string accompaniment uses parallel thirds and sixths. It is stylistically similar to a minuet, and is formally an adapted ternary structure.

=== 5 ===
The tenor recitative, "Ich danke dir" (I thank You), ends with an ascending phrase meant to represent an appeal to heaven.

=== 6 ===
The duet aria for alto and tenor, "Seid wachsam, ihr heiligen Wächter" (Be wakeful, you holy watchers), employs canon technique and a repeated interrupted cadence. Its introduction has been described as "the most athletic of bassoon lines". The tenor and alto voices repeat the opening bassoon figure in canon.

=== 7 ===
The work ends with a harmonically complex four-part setting of the chorale, "Ach, Herr, laß dein lieb Engelein" (Ah, Lord, let Your dear little angel). It is a prayer to be sent an angel to carry the soul in Abraham's Bosom, and a promise to praise God eternally. Bach's setting is remarkable for its final two bars: the trumpets and timpani create a "magnificent blaze of sound". Bach chose the same stanza of Schalling's chorale to end his St John Passion, in the work's first and last version.

== Publication ==
The cantata was first published in 1884 in the Bach-Gesellschaft Ausgabe (BGA).

== Recordings ==
The table is excerpted from the listing on the Bach Cantatas Website. Ensembles playing period instruments in historically informed performances are marked by green background.

Recordings of Man singet mit Freuden vom Sieg, BWV 149
Title	Conductor / Choir / Orchestra	Soloists	Label	Year	Instr.
Les Grandes Cantates de J.S. Bach Vol. 17	Fritz Werner Heinrich-Schütz-Chor Heilbronn Pforzheim Chamber Orchestra	Agnes Giebel; Claudia Hellmann; Georg Jelden; Erich Wenk	Erato Records	1964	Chamber
J. S. Bach: Cantatas BWV 126 & BWV 149	Wolfgang Gönnenwein Süddeutscher Madrigalchor Consortium Musicum	Elly Ameling; Janet Baker; Theo Altmeyer; Hans Sotin	EMI	1967	Chamber
Die Bach Kantate Vol. 32	Helmuth Rilling Gächinger Kantorei Bach-Collegium Stuttgart	Arleen Augér; Mechthild Georg; Aldo Baldin; Philippe Huttenlocher	Hänssler	1984	
Bach Edition Vol. 20 – Cantatas Vol. 9	Pieter Jan Leusink Holland Boys Choir Netherlands Bach Collegium	Ruth Holton; Sytse Buwalda; Knut Schoch; Bas Ramselaar	Brilliant Classics	1999	Period
Bach Cantatas Vol. 7: Ambronay / Bremen / For the 14th Sunday after Trinity / For the Feast of St Michael and All Angels	John Eliot Gardiner: Monteverdi Choir; Choir of Clare; Choir of Trinity College; English Baroque Soloists	Malin Hartelius; Richard Wyn Roberts; James Gilchrist; Peter Harvey	Soli Deo Gloria	2000	Period
J. S. Bach: Complete Cantatas Vol. 20	Ton Koopman Amsterdam Baroque Orchestra & Choir	Sandrine Piau; Bogna Bartosz; Christoph Prégardien; Klaus Mertens	Antoine Marchand	2003	Period
J. S. Bach: Cantatas Vol. 50 – Man singet mit Freuden, Cantatas · 49 · 145 · 149 · 174 (Cantatas from Leipzig 1726–29)	Masaaki Suzuki Bach Collegium Japan	Hana Blažíková; Robin Blaze; Gerd Türk; Peter Kooy	BIS	2011	Period

== See also ==
- BWV 149/1a, formerly BWV Anh. 198 – "Concerto", an abandoned sketch for an alternative setting of the Cantata's opening movement?

== Sources ==
- Man singet mit Freuden vom Sieg, BWV 149: Scores at the International Music Score Library Project
- BWV 149 Man singet mit Freuden vom Sieg: English translation, University of Vermont
- Luke Dahn: BWV 149.7 bach-chorales.com
