= Meel =

Meel may refer to:

- Indian club
- Nico van der Meel
- Raul Meel (born 1941), Estonian artist and concrete poet
