= Martin Schalling the Elder =

Martin Schalling the Elder (died 27 February 1552 in Strasbourg) was a Protestant theologian and reformer.

== Life ==
Schalling was born in Ortenberg but as a friend of Martin Bucer he came to Strabsbourg. In 1537 he became a deacon in Jung-St. Peter and in 1542 he became a pastor in Wolfach. The Count of Fürstenberg summoned him to Donaueschingen. He was an annual visitor to the county's parishes alongside Caspar Hedio.

Since he had been appointed for life, he could have stayed there even after the Augsburg Interim, but before 1549 he moved back to Strasbourg. From there he led the Reformation in Weitersweiler. In 1550 he wrote the treatise De corpore et sanguine Christi in Eucharistia institutio (On Christ's body and blood in the institution of the Eucharist), for his son Martin Schalling the Younger and at the suggestion of Martin Bucer. Twenty five years later, in 1576, the text was adopted and published in Wittenberg.

== Sources ==
- Joh. Schneider: Schalling, Martin. In: Allgemeine Deutsche Biographie (ADB). Band 30, Duncker & Humblot, Leipzig 1890, S. 566–569.
- F. Medicus: Geschichte der evangelischen Kirche im Königreich Bayern. Erlangen 1863
- Ph. Wackernagel: Bibliographie. Leipzig 1855, S. 368
- K. Schottenloher: Die Widmungsvorrede des 16. Jhs. Reformationsgeschichtliche Studien und Texte 76/77. Münster 1953, S. 143
