= Mer hahn en neue Oberkeet, BWV 212 =

Secular cantata by Johann Sebastian Bach

Mer hahn en neue Oberkeet BWV 212
- Secular cantata by J. S. Bach
- Other name: Peasant Cantata, Bauern-Kantate
- Occasion: Birthday of Carl Heinrich von Dieskau
- Text: by Picander
- Performed: 30 August 1742

Mer hahn en neue Oberkeet (We have a new governor), BWV 212, is a secular cantata by Johann Sebastian Bach. It was entitled the "Cantate burlesque" by Bach himself, but is now popularly known as the Peasant Cantata. It is the last definitely dated Bach cantata.

== History and text ==
This cantata's libretto was written by Christian Friedrich Henrici, known as Picander, and was written for performance on 30 August 1742 at Rittergut Kleinzschocher near Leipzig. On that day the hereditary feudal lord and Kreishauptmann, Carl Heinrich von Dieskau, chamberlain to the Elector of Saxony, celebrated his thirty-sixth birthday with a huge fireworks display and, as was customary, took homage from the peasants on the same occasion. It is thought that Picander asked Bach to set his poetry to music.

The text describes how an unnamed farmer laughs with the farmer's wife Mieke about the tax collector's machinations while praising the economy of Dieskau's wife, ending by especially cheering on Dieskau. In places it uses the dialect of Upper Saxon German ("Guschel" for mouth, "Dahlen" for love-games, "Ranzen" for belly and "Neu-Schock" for a 60 Groschen piece).

== Scoring and structure ==
The cantata is scored for two voices: the farmer (bass) and Mieke (soprano). The instrumentation includes a string trio of violin, viola and basso continuo, accompanied by a flute, horn and second violin respectively.

The piece has 24 movements, more than any other Bach cantata:

1. Overture (A major- A minor- A major)
2. Duet aria: Mer hahn en neue Oberkeet (A major)
3. Duet recitative: Nu, Mieke, gib dein Guschel immer her (A major)
4. Aria (soprano): Ach, es schmeckt doch gar zu gut (A major)
5. Recitative (bass): Der Herr ist gut: Allein der Schösser (D major)
6. Aria (bass): Ach, Herr Schösser, geht nicht gar zu schlimm (D major)
7. Recitative (soprano): Es bleibt dabei (B minor)
8. Aria (soprano): Unser trefflicher (B minor)
9. Duet recitative: Er hilft uns allen, alt und jung
10. Aria (soprano): Das ist galant (G major)
11. Recitative (bass): Und unsre gnädge Frau
12. Aria (bass): Fünfzig Taler bares Geld (B-flat major)
13. Recitative (soprano): Im Ernst ein Wort!
14. Aria (soprano): Klein-Zschocher müsse (A major)
15. Recitative (bass): Das ist zu klug vor dich
16. Aria (bass): Es nehme zehntausend Dukaten (G major)
17. Recitative (soprano): Das klingt zu liederlich
18. Aria (soprano): Gib, Schöne (D major)
19. Recitative (bass): Du hast wohl recht
20. Aria (bass): Dein Wachstum sei feste und lache vor Lust! (A major)
21. Duet recitative: Und damit sei es auch genung
22. Aria (soprano): Und dass ihr's alle wisst (B minor)
23. Duet recitative: Mein Schatz, erraten!
24. Chorus: Wir gehen nun, wo der Dudelsack (F major)

== Music ==
In accordance with the nature of the text, Bach kept the musical phrases short and the accompaniment mostly simple. He repeatedly drew on popular dance forms, folk and popular melodies (such as La Folia); for the duet recitative "Nu, Mieke, gib dein Guschel immer her" (Saxon dialect for "Now, Mary, give me your mouth"), he quoted the fast part of the tune of "Großvatertanz" for the orchestra following the girl's words, "If it were only that! I know you already, you ruffian, you want always more after that." knowing that the audience was aware of the omitted words, "with you and me into the featherbed". He also used excerpts from his own pieces (BWV Anh. 11 and BWV 201, No. 7).

== Recordings ==
- Rudolf Ewerhart, Württemberg Chamber Orchestra. Bach Cantatas. Vox 1965
- Nikolaus Harnoncourt, Concentus Musicus Wien. J. S. Bach: Cantatas BWV 211 & BWV 212. Telefunken 1967
- Peter Schreier, Kammerorchester Berlin. Bach Made in Germany Vol. VII – Secular Cantatas VII, Eterna 1975
- Rosmarie Hofmann, Gregory Reinhadt, Linde-Consort, Hans-Martin Linde. J. S. Bach: Bauern-Kantate; Kaffee-Kantate. EMI Reflexe 1984
- Emma Kirkby, David Thomas, Academy of Ancient Music, Christopher Hogwood. J. S. Bach: Coffee Cantata / Peasant Cantata. L'Oiseau-Lyre 1987
- Helmuth Rilling, Bach-Collegium Stuttgart. Edition Bachakademie Vol. 67 – Secular Cantatas. Hänssler 1996
- Ton Koopman, Amsterdam Baroque Orchestra. J. S. Bach: Complete Cantatas Vol. 5. Antoine Marchand 1996
- Masaaki Suzuki, Bach Collegium Japan. J. S. Bach: BWV 203, 209, 212. BIS 2016
- Bach: Kantaten No. 32, Orchester der J. S. Bach-Stiftung, Rudolf Lutz, J. S. Bach-Stiftung, 2020
