= Ich liebe den Höchsten von ganzem Gemüte, BWV 174 =

Church cantata by Johann Sebastian Bach

Ich liebe den Höchsten von ganzem Gemüte
- BWV 174
- Church cantata by J. S. Bach
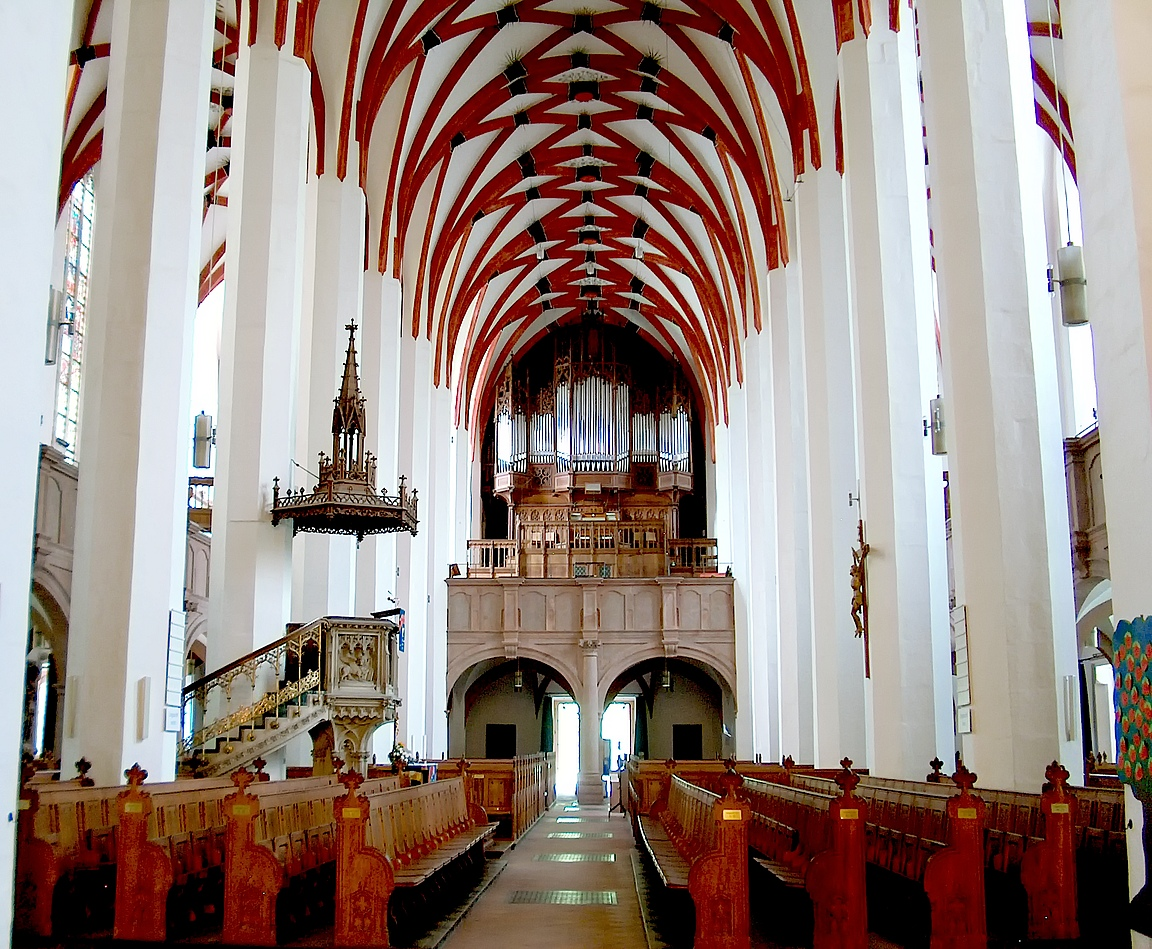
- Thomaskirche, Leipzig
- Occasion: Pentecost Monday
- Cantata text: Picander
- Chorale: Herzlich lieb hab ich dich, o Herr
- Performed: 6 June 1729: Leipzig
- Movements: 6
- Vocal: SATB choir; solo: alto, tenor and bass
- Instrumental: 2 corni da caccia; 2 oboes; taille; 3 violins; 3 violas; 3 cellos; continuo

Ich liebe den Höchsten von ganzem Gemüte (I love the Highest with my entire being), BWV 174, is a church cantata by Johann Sebastian Bach. He composed the cantata in Leipzig for the second day of Pentecost and first performed it on 6 June 1729.

== History and words ==
Bach wrote the cantata in Leipzig for Pentecost Monday. The prescribed readings for the feast day were from the Acts of the Apostles, the sermon of Peter for Cornelius (Acts 10:42–48), and from the Gospel of John, "God loved the world so much ..." from the meeting of Jesus and Nicodemus (John 3:16–21). The cantata text was written by Picander and published in his collection of cantata texts for a year in 1728. Picander had written in the preface that he hoped "the lack of poetic elegance would be compensated for by the sweetness of the incomparable Kapellmeister Bach, and that these songs will be sung Lieder in the main churches of devout Leipzig." Nine of Bach's cantatas on his texts in that volume are extant. If Bach composed more, they are lost. In the first aria the poet considers the beginning of the gospel, "Also hat Gott die Welt geliebt ..." (For God so loved the world, that he gave his only begotten Son, that whosoever believeth in him should not perish, but have everlasting life), and concludes that the Christian owes love to God in return for God's love. The gospel word is quoted and reflected in the following recitative. The last aria urges the congregation to seize the salvation offered by God's love. The closing chorale is the first stanza of Martin Schalling's hymn "Herzlich lieb hab ich dich, o Herr", expressing love for God.

For the opening Sinfonia, Bach added parts to a movement from his Brandenburg Concerto No. 3. He could employ many players as he had started to direct a Collegium Musicum, a Bürgervereinigung (an association of musically inclined burghers) who played his church music as well. Bach first performed the cantata on 6 June 1729; the year is noted in the original parts.

== Scoring and structure ==
The cantata in five movements is "lavishly scored" for the feast day, for three soloists, alto, tenor and bass, a four-part choir only in the chorale, two corni da caccia, two oboes, taille (tenor oboe), three solo violins, three solo violas, three solo cellos and basso continuo.

1. Sinfonia
2. Aria (alto): Ich liebe den Höchsten von ganzem Gemüte
3. Recitative (tenor): O Liebe, welcher keine gleich
4. Aria (bass): Greifet zu, faßt das Heil
5. Chorale: Herzlich lieb hab ich dich, o Herr

== Music ==
The cantata begins with a Sinfonia, which Bach derived from the first movement of his Brandenburg Concerto No. 3, possibly composed already in Weimar. For the cantata, he added to the nine string parts two new parts for corno da caccia and a ripieno trio of oboe I and violin I, oboe II and violin II, taille and viola, parts that are also new, but reinforcing existing parts. John Eliot Gardiner hears in the result the addition of "new-minted sheen and force to the original concerto movement, its colours and rhythms even sharper than before".

In the first aria, two obbligato oboes in imitation introduce themes which the voice picks up. "Gently rocking siciliano melodies, expressing spiritual tranquillity and compassion" appear in extended ritornellos. The recitative is accompanied by three upper string parts, similar to the original Brandenburg concerto movement. In the second aria, the violins and violas are combined to an obbligato part, "whose 'knocking' motif of repeated notes insistently underlines the urgency of the text". The cantata is closed by a four-part chorale setting of the well-known melody which Bach used to conclude his St John Passion with the third stanza, "Ach Herr, laß dein lieb Engelein".

== Recordings ==
- Die Bach Kantate Vol. 5, Helmuth Rilling, Gächinger Kantorei, Bach-Collegium Stuttgart, Julia Hamari, Aldo Baldin, Wolfgang Schöne, Hänssler 1984
- J. S. Bach: Das Kantatenwerk · Complete Cantatas · Les Cantates, Folge / Vol. 40, Nikolaus Harnoncourt, Tölzer Knabenchor, Concentus Musicus Wien, soloist of the Tölzer Knabenchor, Kurt Equiluz, Robert Holl, Teldec 1987
- Bach Cantatas Vol. 26: Long Melford For Whit Sunday For Whit Monday, John Eliot Gardiner, Monteverdi Choir, English Baroque Soloists, Nathalie Stutzmann, Christoph Genz, Panajotis Iconomou, Soli Deo Gloria 2000
- Bach Edition Vol. 21 – Cantatas Vol. 12, Pieter Jan Leusink, Holland Boys Choir, Netherlands Bach Collegium, Sytse Buwalda, Nico van der Meel, Bas Ramselaar, Brilliant Classics 2000
- J. S. Bach: Complete Cantatas Vol. 19, Ton Koopman, Amsterdam Baroque Orchestra & Choir, Bogna Bartosz, Christoph Prégardien, Klaus Mertens, Antoine Marchand 2003
- J. S. Bach: Cantatas Vol. 50 – Man singet mit Freuden, Cantatas · 49 · 145 · 149 · 174 (Cantatas from Leipzig 1726–29), Masaaki Suzuki, Bach Collegium Japan, Robin Blaze, Gerd Türk, Peter Kooy, BIS 2011

== Sources ==
- Ich liebe den Höchsten von ganzem Gemüte, BWV 174: Scores at the International Music Score Library Project
- Ich liebe den Höchsten von ganzem Gemüte BWV 174; BC A 87 / Sacred cantata (2nd Day of Pentecost) Leipzig University
- Cantata BWV 174 Ich liebe den Höchsten von ganzem Gemüte: history, scoring, sources for text and music, translations to various languages, discography, discussion, Bach Cantatas Website
- BWV 174 Ich liebe den Höchsten von ganzem Gemüte: English translation, University of Vermont
- BWV 174 Ich liebe den Höchsten von ganzem Gemüte: text, scoring, University of Alberta (in German)
- Julian Mincham (2010). "Chapter 43 BWV 174 Ich liebe den Höchsten von ganzem Gemüte". The Cantatas of Johann Sebastian Bach.
