= Freu dich sehr, o meine Seele =

Lutheran hymn by Christoph Demantius

- Lutheran hymn
- Cover of variations by Pachelbel
- English: Rejoice greatly, O my soul
- Text: by Christoph Demantius
- Language: German
- Melody: by Louis Bourgeois
- Published: 1620

"Freu dich sehr, o meine Seele" ("Rejoice greatly, O my soul") is a German Lutheran hymn for the dying, with lyrics published by Christoph Demantius in 1620, sung to a melody from the Genevan Psalter. J. S. Bach used stanzas from the hymn in several cantatas. The hymn appears in the Protestant hymnal Evangelisches Gesangbuch.

== History ==
Christoph Demantius published "Freu dich sehr, o meine Seele" in 1620 in Freiberg in the collection Threnodiae, as number 115. It is a song for the dying, entitled "Spiritual joy after the Eternal Joy".

The hymn is sung to a melody from the Genevan Psalter. The song appears in the Protestant hymnal Evangelisches Gesangbuch as EG 542, and in other hymnals and songbooks.

== Melodies and settings ==
The hymn is sung to a melody in a triple metre assigned to Psalm 42, "Wie nach einer Wasserquelle", in the Genevan Psalter that Louis Bourgeois published in 1551. This tune has been used for several hymns, in both even metre and triple metre. Several composers, such as Johann Pachelbel, Max Reger and Naji Hakim wrote chorale preludes and other compositions on the tune. Robert Schumann wrote a harmonisation for his Album für die Jugend to which Maurice Ravel composed variations.

Johann Sebastian Bach used stanzas from the hymn in cantatas, the tenth and final stanza to close Wachet! betet! betet! wachet! BWV 70, in 1723 and the ninth stanza in Es erhub sich ein Streit, BWV 19, in 1726. He also composed chorale preludes. Bach used the tune more often with other texts.
