= Ehre sei Gott in der Höhe, BWV 197a =

Christmas song by Johann Sebastian Bach

Ehre sei Gott in der Höhe
- BWV 197.1 · 197a
- Christmas cantata by J. S. Bach
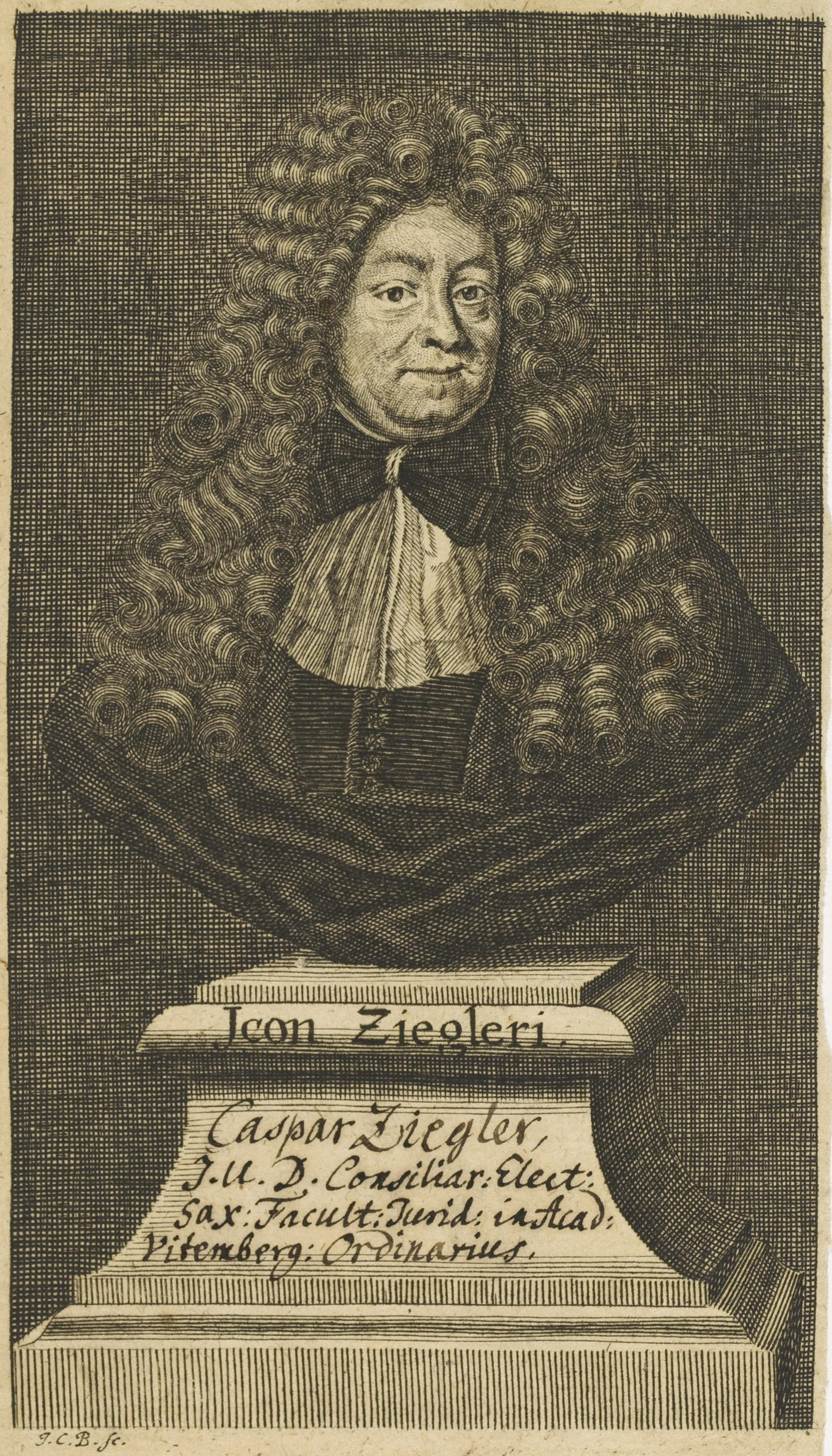
- Caspar Ziegler, the author of the chorale
- Performed: Christmas Day 1728/1729

Ehre sei Gott in der Höhe (Glory be to God in the Highest), BWV 197a (197.1), is a Christmas cantata by Johann Sebastian Bach. He composed it in Leipzig for the First Day of Christmas in 1728 or 1729.

== History and text ==
Bach composed the work in Leipzig for Christmas Day in 1728 or 1729. The prescribed readings for the feast day were from the Epistle of Titus, "God's mercy appeared" (Titus 2:11–14) or from Isaiah, "Unto us a child is born" (Isaiah 9:2–7), and from the Gospel of Luke, the Nativity, Annunciation to the shepherds and the angels' song (Luke 2:1–14). The text of the cantata is by Picander. The chorale is from the 1697 hymn "Ich freue mich in dir" by Caspar Ziegler. Bach later revised the piece into Gott ist unsre Zuversicht, BWV 197.2.

== Scoring and structure ==
The cantata is scored for solo alto and bass voices, a four-part choir, two flutes, oboe d'amore, two violins, viola, bassoon, cello, and continuo.

The piece has seven movements (although there may also have been an opening sinfonia):

1. Chorus: Ehre sei Gott in der Höhe
2. Aria: Erzählet, ihr Himmel, die Ehre Gottes
3. Recitative: O! Liebe, der kein Lieben gleich
4. Aria: O du angenehmer Schatz
5. Recitative: Das Kind ist mein
6. Aria: Ich lasse dich nicht
7. Chorale: Wohlan! so will ich mich

== Music ==
Only the last four movements of the piece are extant.

The nineteen surviving bars of the fourth movement, an alto aria, demonstrate a rare bassoon obbligati and assume a combined ritornello-ternary form.

The fifth movement is a bass recitative with only continuo accompaniment. It is a "harmonically adventurous", "forceful little movement marked by a robust melodic line".

The following bass aria is accompanied by oboe d'amore and continuo, and is a "jaunty, pastoral dance" in 6/8 time and ritornello-ternary form. The movement is notable for a long rising melisma omitted from the reworked version in BWV 197/2.

Musicologist Julian Mincham suggests that the chorale is "one of the sturdiest in the repertoire".

== Recordings ==
The recordings are taken from the listing on Bach-Cantatas:

- Gächinger Kantorei / Bach-Collegium Stuttgart, Helmuth Rilling. Edition Bachakademie Vol. 140. Hänssler, 1999.
- Bach Collegium Japan, Masaaki Suzuki. J. S. Bach: Cantatas Vol. 54. BIS, 2012.
