= Picander =

German poet (1700–1764)

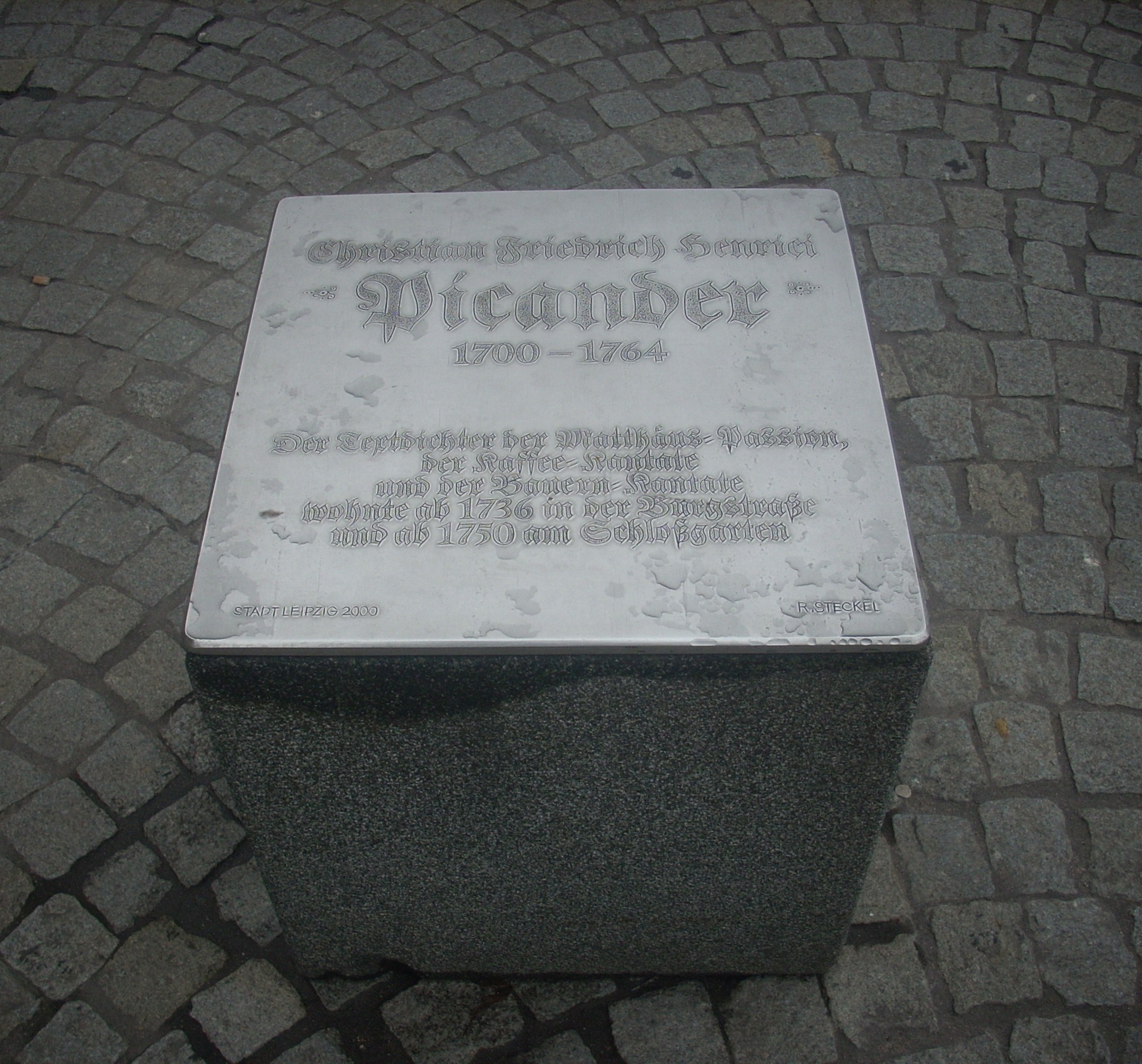
- Plaque in Leipzig
- Born: Christian Friedrich Henrici; 14 January 1700; Stolpen
- Died: 10 May 1764 (aged 64); Leipzig
- Writing career
- Pen name: Picander

Christian Friedrich Henrici (14 January 1700 – 10 May 1764), writing under the pen name Picander, was a German poet and librettist for many works by Johann Sebastian Bach, notably the St Matthew Passion of 1727.

== Life and career ==
Henrici was born in Stolpen. He studied law at Wittenberg and Leipzig. He wrote to supplement his income from tutoring and continued even after obtaining regular employment as a civil servant.

=== Librettist for Bach ===
Bach moved to Leipzig in 1723. There is uncertainty as to who was writing the libretti he set during his first years in the city. The authors of the libretti for the Chorale cantata cycle of 1724/25 are anonymous. By 1725, Henrici and Bach were working together, resulting in two related compositions, the Shepherd Cantata and an Easter cantata, which became the Easter Oratorio. Their best-known collaboration was the St Matthew Passion of 1727. They worked together on other cantatas, secular (such as the Coffee Cantata, the Peasant Cantata and The Contest between Phoebus and Pan) and religious.

=== Sammlung Erbaulicher Gedanken ===
For a year from the start of Advent 1724, Picander had published spiritual poetry in weekly editions, which he collected in 1725 as Sammlung Erbaulicher Gedanken. This caught Bach's eye, and he started using Picander's poetry for his cantatas from 1725 and used poems from Picander's first collection in his St Matthew Passion.

=== Ernst-Schertzhaffte und Satyrische Gedichte ===
All volumes of Picander's Ernst-schertzhaffte und satyrische Gedichte (Leipzig, 1727–51) contain texts set to music by J. S. Bach, including those for the St Matthew Passion and an associated funeral music for Prince Leopold of Anhalt-Cöthen (Klagt, Kinder, klagt es aller Welt, BWV 244a).

Volumes and editions:

- Vol. I: 1727, reprinted in 1732 and 1736.
- Vol. II: 1729, reprinted in 1734.
- Vol. III: 1732, reprinted in 1737. This volume contained texts published in 1728 as Cantaten auf die Sonn- und Fest-Tage durch das gantze Jahr.
- Vol. IV: 1737.
- Reworked fourth edition, containing a selection of previous editions, in two volumes: 1748.
- Vol. V: 1751.

=== Lost scores and reconstructions ===
In some cases, Henrici's texts have survived, and Bach's settings have not. The lost scores include cases where the music has vanished without trace and others where there are clues as to what music Bach used to set the words, allowing the possibility of reconstruction.

==== Lost scores ====
In the preface to the third volume (1732) Picander claimed that J. S. Bach set a whole cycle of his cantata texts in 1729. As only nine of Bach's settings are known to have survived (they include the cantatas for Christmas Ehre sei Gott in der Höhe, BWV 197a, New Year Gott, wie dein Name, so ist auch dein Ruhm, BWV 171, Whit Monday Ich liebe den Höchsten von ganzem Gemüte, BWV 174, and the feast of St Michael Man singet mit Freuden vom Sieg, BWV 149) the statement made in the preface has been debated.

==== Reconstructed scores ====
Examples of reconstructions include:

- Entfliehet, verschwindet, entweichet, ihr Sorgen, a 1725 secular cantata (BWV 249a) also known as the Shepherd Cantata. This can be reconstructed using the music of the Easter Oratorio
- Klagt, Kinder, klagt es aller Welt, 1729 funeral music for Prince Leopold (BWV 244a). Bach used music from an earlier funeral ode (to a text by Johann Christoph Gottsched) and music from the St Matthew Passion (to a text by Picander),
- the St Mark Passion, a passion performed in 1731 (BWV 247)

In these cases, Bach's music can be reconstructed because it is known to have been used in surviving pieces. Bach sometimes returned to compositions commissioned for one-off occasions and recycled the music. Picander was able to help the composer in this process by providing metrically similar new texts, effectively setting words to Bach's music. In the case of the Shepherd Cantata, there was not much of a gap between this work and a religious version, suggesting that the composer may have envisaged a double use of the music from the outset.

== Sources ==
- (in German) Paul Flossman. Picander (Christian Friedrich Henrici). Leipzig: Liebertwolkwitz (1899)
