= Martin Schalling the Younger =

German theologian (1532–1608)

Martin Schalling the Younger (21 April 1532 – 29 December 1608) was a Protestant theologian, reformer and hymnwriter. He was the son of Martin Schalling the Elder.

== Life ==
Schalling was born in Strasbourg in 1532. He studied in Wittenberg and became a magister in 1554. He moved to Regensburg as a deacon, but came into conflict with Nicolaus Gallus and moved on to Amberg. As Frederick III was seeking to introduce the Reformation to his lands with the assistance of Caspar Olevian, Schalling defied him and sought advice from Wittenberg. Schalling had to leave Amberg and next went to Vilseck. Only during the reign of Louis VI was he able to return to Amberg as a court preacher and superintendent. He worked at the 'Konkordienbemühungen', backing his tutor Philipp Melanchthon, but later withdrew. In 1585 he was a pastor in Nuremberg and continued working for twenty years. Schalling died in Nuremberg in 1608.

His best-known work as a hymn-writer is "Herzlich lieb hab ich dich, o Herr" (What hearty love I have for you, oh Lord, EG 397), which has been set by several composers, including Heinrich Schütz (in his Geistlichen Chormusik), Dietrich Buxtehude (cantata, BuxWV 41) and Johann Sebastian Bach (at the close of the St John Passion). He drafted its text on 2 July 1569 ("the day of the Visitation of Mary") as a closing prayer for a sermon (a facsimile of the manuscript is in Eckert 1969, Taf. II-IV, nach S. 216).

== Sources ==
- A. Eckert: "Martin Schalling. 1532-1608." In: Zeitschrift für bayerische Kirchengeschichte 38 (1969), S. 204-242.
- F. Medicus: Geschichte der evangelischen Kirche im Königreich Bayern. Erlangen 1863.
- Joh. Schneider: Schalling, Martin. In: Allgemeine Deutsche Biographie (ADB). Band 30, Duncker & Humblot, Leipzig 1890, S. 566–569.
- K. Schottenloher: Die Widmungsvorrede des 16. Jhs. Reformationsgeschichtliche Studien und Texte 76/77. Münster 1953, S. 143.
- Joachim Stalmann: Schalling, Martin. In: Biographisch-Bibliographisches Kirchenlexikon (BBKL). Band 8, Bautz, Herzberg 1994, ISBN 3-88309-053-0, Sp. 1583–1585.
- Ph. Wackernagel: Bibliographie. Leipzig 1855, S. 368
