= Nico van der Meel =

Dutch tenor

Nico van der Meel is a Dutch tenor, born in 1956 in The Hague. He made his debut with the Concertgebouw Orchestra during the 1987/1988 season and made a recording of Bach's St John Passion, conducted by Sigiswald Kuijken. Between 1989 and 1996, he made several tours and recordings of Bach's Mass in B minor and St Matthew Passion. He has since performed with conductors such as Nikolaus Harnoncourt, John Eliot Gardiner, Gustav Leonhardt, Peter Schreier, Jan Willem de Vriend, Helmuth Rilling, Michel Corboz and Sir Colin Davis. He has also performed in a number of operatic roles, including Alfred in Die Fledermaus by Johann Strauss, Sellem in Igor Stravinsky's The Rake's Progress, Pedrillo in Mozart's Die Entführung aus dem Serail under Christopher Hogwood, among others. He is a member of the group Camerata Trajectina and conducts the William Byrd Vocal Ensemble, which specializes in a cappella music from the 16th to the 20th century.
