= O heilges Geist- und Wasserbad, BWV 165 =

Church cantata for Trinity Sunday by Johann Sebastian Bach

O heilges Geist- und Wasserbad
- BWV 165
- Church cantata by J. S. Bach
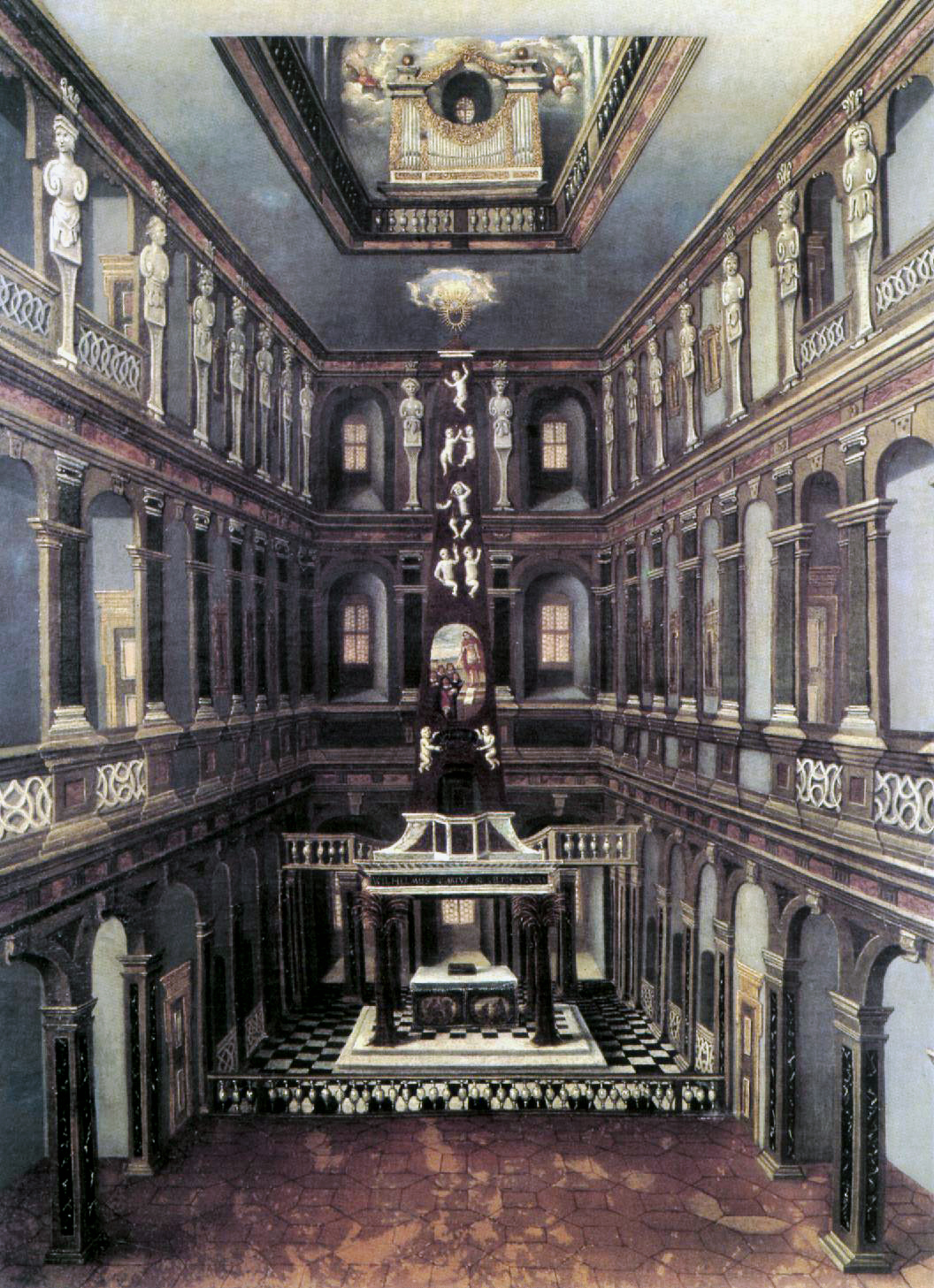
- The Schlosskirche in Weimar
- Occasion: Trinity
- Cantata text: Salomon Franck
- Chorale: "Nun laßt uns Gott dem Herren" by Ludwig Helmbold
- Performed: 16 June 1715: Weimar
- Movements: 6
- Vocal: SATB choir and solo
- Instrumental: 2 violins; viola; cello; bassoon; continuo

O heilges Geist- und Wasserbad (O holy bath of Spirit and water (Note: Although grammatically heiliges agrees with Bad instead of Geist, Dellal translates "O bath of Holy Spirit and of water, and W. Murray Young "O Holy Ghost and water bath" (as cited at Bach Cantatas Website))), BWV 165, is a church cantata by Johann Sebastian Bach. He composed it in Weimar for Trinity Sunday and led the first performance on 16 June 1715.

Bach had taken up regular cantata composition a year before when he was promoted to concertmaster at the Weimar court, writing one cantata per month to be performed in the Schlosskirche, the court chapel in the ducal Schloss. O heilges Geist- und Wasserbad was his first cantata for Trinity Sunday, the feast day marking the end of the first half of the liturgical year. The libretto by the court poet Salomo Franck is based on the day's prescribed gospel reading about the meeting of Jesus and Nicodemus. It is close in content to the gospel and connects the concept of the Trinity to baptism.

The music is structured in six movements, alternating arias and recitatives, and scored for a small ensemble of four vocal parts, strings and continuo. The voices are combined only in the closing chorale, the fifth stanza of Ludwig Helmbold's hymn "Nun laßt uns Gott dem Herren", which mentions scripture, baptism and the Eucharist, in a summary of the cantata's topic. Based on the text full of Baroque imagery, Bach composed a sermon in music, especially in the two recitatives for the bass voice, and achieved contrasts in expression. He led the first performance, and probably another on the Trinity Sunday concluding his first year as Thomaskantor in Leipzig on 4 June 1724.

== Background ==
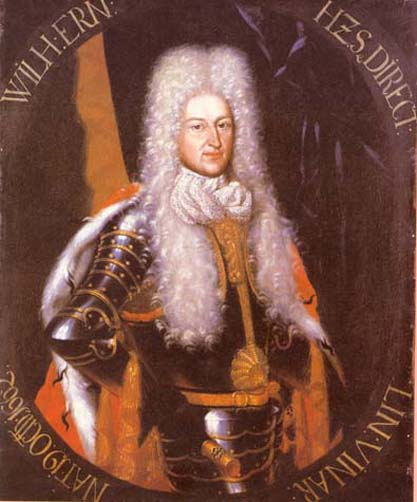
Wilhelm Ernst, Duke of Saxe-Weimar

On 2 March 1714 Bach was appointed Konzertmeister (concert master) of the Weimar Hofkapelle (court chapel) of the co-reigning dukes Wilhelm Ernst and Ernst August of Saxe-Weimar. The position was created for him, possibly on his demand, giving him "a newly defined rank order" according to Christoph Wolff.

From 1695, an arrangement shared the responsibility for church music at the Schlosskirche (court church) between the Kapellmeister Samuel Drese and the Vize-Kapellmeister Georg Christoph Strattner, who took care of one Sunday per month while the Kapellmeister served on three Sundays. The pattern probably continued from 1704, when Strattner was succeeded by Drese's son Johann Wilhelm. When Konzertmeister Bach also assumed the principal responsibility for one cantata a month, the Kapellmeister's workload was further reduced to two Sundays per month.

The performance venue on the third tier of the court church, in German called Himmelsburg (Heaven's Castle), has been described by Wolff as "congenial and intimate", calling for a small ensemble of singers and players. Performers of the cantatas were mainly the core group of the Hofkapelle, formed by seven singers, three leaders and five other instrumentalists. Additional players of the military band were available when needed, and also town musicians and singers of the gymnasium. Bach as the concertmaster probably led the performances as the first violinist, while the organ part was played by Bach's students such as Johann Martin Schubart and Johann Caspar Vogler. Even in settings like chamber music, Bach requested a strong continuo section with cello, bassoon and violone in addition to the keyboard instrument.

=== Monthly cantatas from 1714 to 1715 ===
While Bach had composed vocal music only for special occasions until his promotion, the regular chance to compose and perform a new work resulted in a program into which Bach "threw himself wholeheartedly", as Christoph Wolff notes. In his first cantata of the series, Himmelskönig, sei willkommen, BWV 182, for the double feast of Palm Sunday and Annunciation, he showed his skill in an elaborate work in eight movements, for four vocal parts and at times ten-part instrumental writing, and presenting himself as a violin soloist.

The following table of works performed by Bach as concertmaster between 1714 and the end of 1715 is based on tables by Wolff and Alfred Dürr. According to Dürr, O heilges Geist- und Wasserbad is the eleventh cantata composition of this period. The works contain arias and recitatives, as in contemporary opera, while earlier cantatas had concentrated on biblical text and chorale. Some works, such as Widerstehe doch der Sünde, may have been composed earlier.

Bach's monthly cantatas from 1714 to 1715
Date	Occasion	BWV	Incipit	Text source
25 March 1714	Annunciation, Palm Sunday	182	Himmelskönig, sei willkommen	Franck?
21 April 1714	Jubilate	12	Weinen, Klagen, Sorgen, Zagen	Franck?
20 May 1714	Pentecost	172	Erschallet, ihr Lieder	Franck?
17 June 1714	Third Sunday after Trinity	21	Ich hatte viel Bekümmernis	Franck?
15 July 1714	Seventh Sunday after Trinity	54	Widerstehe doch der Sünde	Lehms
12 August 1714	Eleventh Sunday after Trinity	199	Mein Herze schwimmt im Blut	Lehms
2 December 1714	First Sunday in Advent	61	Nun komm, der Heiden Heiland	Neumeister
30 December 1714	Sunday after Christmas	152	Tritt auf die Glaubensbahn	Franck
24 March 1715 ?	Oculi	80a	Alles, was von Gott geboren	Franck
31 April 1715	Easter	31	Der Himmel lacht! Die Erde jubilieret	Franck
16 June 1715	Trinity	165	O heilges Geist- und Wasserbad	Franck
14 July 1715	Fourth Sunday after Trinity	185	Barmherziges Herze der ewigen Liebe	Franck
6 October 1715 ?	16th Sunday after Trinity	161	Komm, du süße Todesstunde	Franck
3 November 1715 ?	20th Sunday after Trinity	162	Ach! ich sehe, itzt, da ich zur Hochzeit gehe	Franck
24 November 1715	23rd Sunday after Trinity	163	Nur jedem das Seine	Franck

== Topic and text ==
=== Trinity Sunday ===
Bach composed O heilges Geist- und Wasserbad for Trinity Sunday, the Sunday concluding the first half of the liturgical year. The prescribed readings for the day were from the Epistle to the Romans, "What depth of the riches of the wisdom and knowledge of God" (Romans 11:33–36), and from the Gospel of John, the meeting of Jesus and Nicodemus (John 3:1–15).

In Leipzig, Bach composed two more cantatas for the occasion which focused on different aspects of the readings, Höchsterwünschtes Freudenfest, BWV 194, first composed for the inauguration of church and organ in Störmthal on 2 November 1723, Es ist ein trotzig und verzagt Ding, BWV 176 (1725) and the chorale cantata Gelobet sei der Herr, mein Gott, BWV 129 (1726). Scholars debate if Bach performed on Trinity Sunday of 1724, which fell on 4 June, Höchsterwünschtes Freudenfest or O heilges Geist- und Wasserbad or both.

=== Cantata text ===
The libretto was written by the court poet, Salomon Franck, and published in Evangelisches Andachts-Opffer in 1715. The opening refers to Jesus' words in John 3:5: "Except a man be born of water and of the Spirit, he cannot enter into the kingdom of God."(John 3:5) The second movement, a recitative, reflects upon birth in the Spirit as baptism through God's grace: "Er wird im Geist und Wasserbade ein Kind der Seligkeit und Gnade" (In the bath of spirit and water he becomes a child of blessedness and grace). Movement 3, an aria for alto, considers that the bond has to be renewed throughout life, because it will be broken by man, reflected in movement 4. The last aria is a prayer for the insight that the death of Jesus brought salvation, termed "Todes Tod" (death's death). The cantata concludes with the fifth stanza of Ludwig Helmbold's hymn of 1575, "Nun laßt uns Gott dem Herren", mentioning scripture, baptism and the Eucharist. Bach used the eighth and final stanza, "Erhalt uns in der Wahrheit" (Keep us in the truth), to conclude his cantata Gott der Herr ist Sonn und Schild, BWV 79.

Salomon expresses his thought in Baroque style rich in imagery. The image of the serpent is used in several meanings: as the serpent which seduced Adam and Eve to sin in paradise, as the symbol which Moses erected in the desert, and related to the gospel's verse 14: "And as Moses lifted up the serpent in the wilderness, even so must the Son of man be lifted up".

== Performance and publication ==
Bach led the first performance of the cantata on 16 June 1715. The performance material for Weimar is lost. Bach performed the work again as Thomaskantor in Leipzig. Extant performance material was prepared by his assistant Johann Christian Köpping. The first possible revival is the Trinity Sunday of Bach's first year in office, 4 June 1724, also the conclusion of his first year and first Leipzig cantata cycle, because he had assumed the office on the first Sunday after Trinity the year before. Bach made presumably minor changes.

The cantata was published in the Bach-Ausgabe, the first edition of Bach's complete works by the Bach-Gesellschaft, in 1887 in volume 33, edited by Franz Wüllner. In the second edition of the complete works, the Neue Bach-Ausgabe, it appeared in 1967, edited by Dürr, with a Kritischer Bericht (Critical report) following in 1968.

== Music ==
=== Scoring and structure ===
The title on the copy by Johann Christian Köpping is: "Concerto a 2 Violi:1 Viola. Fagotto Violoncello S.A.T.e Basso e Continuo / di Joh:Seb:Bach" (Concerto for 2 violins, 1 viola. Bassoon Cello S.A.T and Bass and Continuo / by Joh:Seb:Bach). The cantata in six movements is scored like chamber music for four vocal soloists (soprano, alto, tenor and bass), a four-part choir (SATB) in the closing chorale, two violins (Vl), viola (Va), bassoon (Fg), cello (Vc) and basso continuo (Bc). The bassoon is called for, but has no independent part. The duration is given as about 15 minutes.

In the following table of the movements, the scoring follows the Neue Bach-Ausgabe, and the abbreviations for voices and instruments the list of Bach cantatas. The keys and time signatures are taken from the Bach scholar Alfred Dürr, using the symbol for common time (4/4). The instruments are shown separately for winds and strings, while the continuo, playing throughout, is not shown.

Movements of O heilges Geist- und Wasserbad
No.	Title	Text	Type	Vocal	Strings	Bass	Key	Time
1	O heilges Geist- und Wasserbad	Franck	Aria	S	2Vl Va	Fg Bc	G major	common time
2	Die sündige Geburt verdammter Adamserben	Franck	Recitative	B		Bc	E minor – A minor	common time
3	Jesu, der aus großer Liebe	Franck	Aria	A		Bc	E minor	12/8
4	Ich habe ja, mein Seelenbräutigam	Franck	Recitative	B	2Vl Va	Fg Bc	B minor – G major	common time
5	Jesu, meines Todes Tod	Franck	Aria	T	2Vl (unis.)		G major	common time
6	Sein Wort, sein Tauf, sein Nachtmahl	Helmbold	Chorale	SATB	2Vl Va	Fg Bc		common time

=== Movements ===
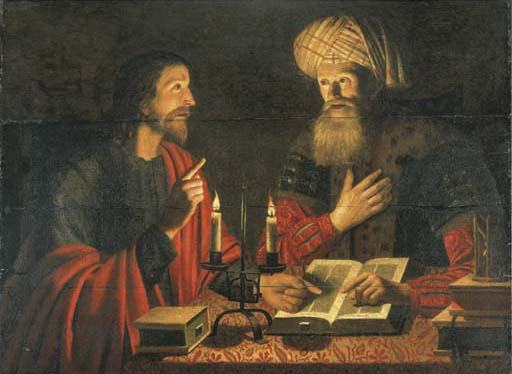
Jesus teaches Nicodemus (seen here in a seventeenth-century painting) was a theme used by both composers and artists.

The cantata consists of solo movements closed by a four-part chorale. Arias alternate with two recitatives, both sung by the bass. John Eliot Gardiner summarizes: "It is a true sermon in music, based on the Gospel account of Jesus' night-time conversation with Nicodemus on the subject of 'new life', emphasising the spiritual importance of baptism." He points out the many musical images of water.

==== 1 ====
In the first aria, "O heilges Geist- und Wasserbad" (O bath of Holy Spirit and of water), the ritornello is a fugue, whereas in the five vocal sections the soprano and violin I are a duo in imitation on the same material. These sections are composed in symmetry, A B C B' A'. The theme of B involves an inversion of material from A, that of C is derived from measure 2 of the ritornello. Dürr writes:

The prominent use made of formal schemes based on the principles of symmetry and inversion is in all probability intentional, serving as a symbol of the inner inversion of mankind — his rebirth in baptism.

==== 2 ====
The first recitative, "Die sündige Geburt verdammter Adamserben" (The sinful birth of the cursed heirs of Adam), is secco, but several phrases are close to an arioso. The musicologist Julian Mincham notes that Bach follows the meaning of the text closely, for example by "rhythmic dislocations for death and destruction", a change in harmony on "poisoned", and "the complete change of mood at the mention of the blessed Christian". He summarizes: "Here anger and resentment at Man’s inheritance of suppurating sin is contrasted against the peace and joy of God-given salvation".

==== 3 ====
The second aria, "Jesu, der aus großer Liebe" (Jesus, who out of great love), accompanied by the continuo, is dominated by an expressive motif with several upward leaps of sixths, which is introduced in the ritornello and picked up by the alto voice in four sections. Mincham notes that "the mood is serious and reflective but also purposeful and quietly resolute".

==== 4 ====
The second recitative, "Ich habe ja, mein Seelenbräutigam" (I have indeed, o bridegroom of my soul), is accompanied by the strings (accompagnato), marked by Bach "Rec: con Stroment" (Recitative: with instruments). The German musicologist Klaus Hofmann notes that the text turns to mysticism, reflecting the Bridegroom, Lamb of God and the serpent in its double meaning. The text is intensified by several melismas, a marking "adagio" on the words "hochheiliges Gotteslamm" (most holy Lamb of God), and by melodic parts for the instruments. Gardiner notes that Bach has images for the serpent displayed in the desert by Moses, and has the accompaniment fade away on the last line "wenn alle Kraft vergehet" (when all my strength has faded).

==== 5 ====
The last aria, "Jesu, meines Todes Tod" (Jesus, death of my death), is set for tenor, accompanied by the violins in unison, marked "Aria Violini unisoni e Tenore". The image of the serpent appears again, described by the composer and musicologist William G. Whittaker: "the whole of the obbligato for violins in unison is constructed out of the image of the bending, writhing, twisting reptile, usually a symbol of horror, but in Bach's musical speech a thing of pellucid beauty".

==== 6 ====
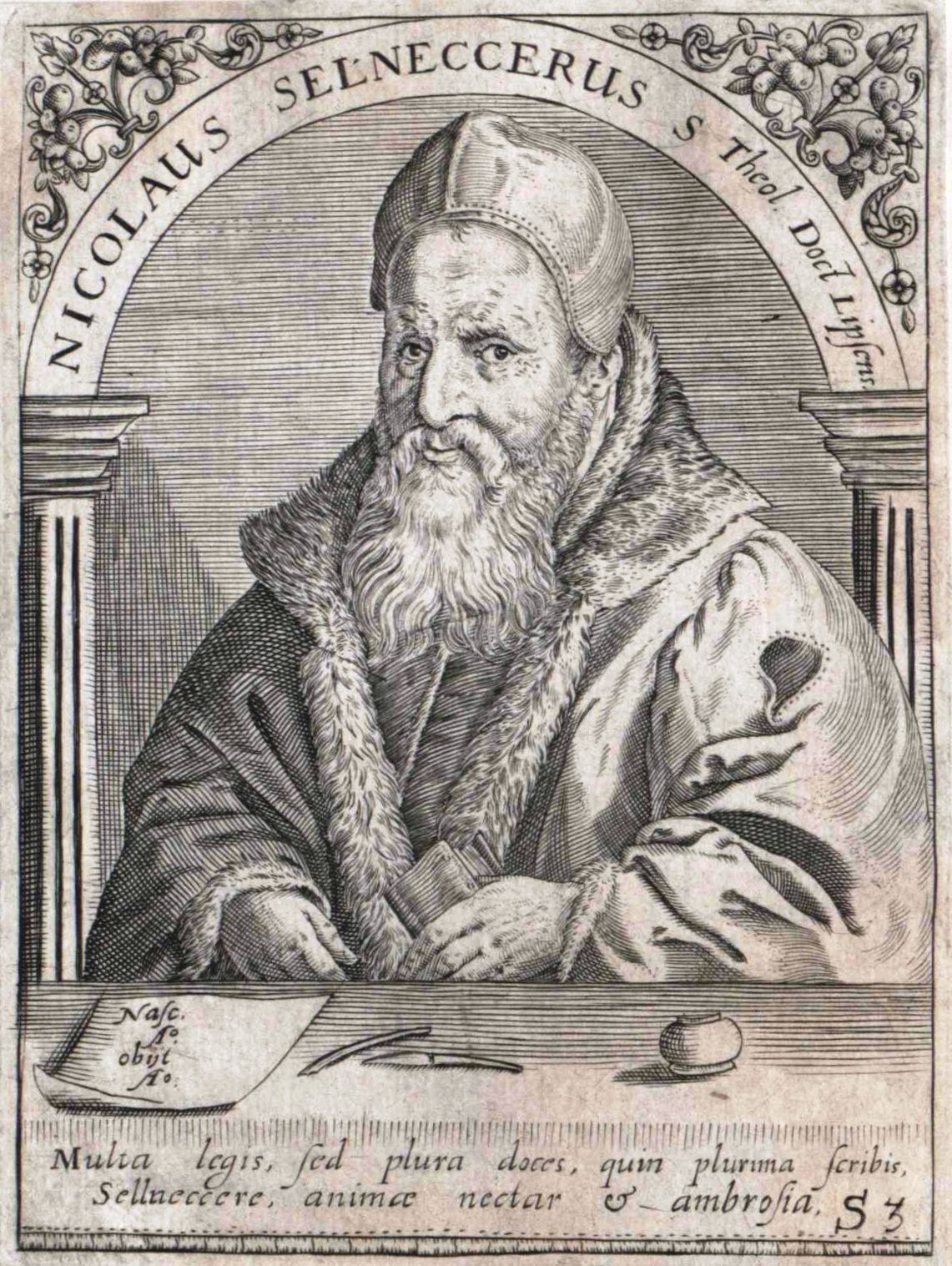
Nikolaus Selnecker, who wrote the hymn tune

The cantata closes with a four-part setting of the chorale stanza, Sein Wort, sein Tauf, sein Nachtmahl (His word, His baptism, His communion). The text in four short lines summarizes that Jesus helps any in need by his words, his baptism and his communion, and ends in the prayer that the Holy Spirit may teach to faithfully trust in this.

Sein Wort, sein Tauf, sein Nachtmahl
Dient wider allen Unfall,
der Heilge Geist im Glauben
lehr uns darauf vertrauen.

Translation:

His Word, His Baptism, His Supper
Serve to protect us against all disaster,
May the Holy Spirit teach us
To rely upon this in faith.

The hymn tune by Nikolaus Selnecker was first published in Leipzig in 1587 in the hymnal Christliche Psalmen, Lieder vnd Kirchengesenge (Christian psalms, songs and church chants). Bach marked the movement: "Chorale. Stromenti concordant", indicating that the instruments play colla parte with the voices.

== Recordings ==
The entries are taken from the listing on the Bach Cantatas Website. Instrumental ensmbles playing period instruments in historically informed performance are marked by green background.

Recordings of O heilges Geist- und Wasserbad
Title	Conductor / Choir / Orchestra	Soloists	Label	Year	Orch. type
Die Bach Kantate Vol. 38	Helmuth Rilling Gächinger Kantorei Bach-Collegium Stuttgart	Arleen Augér; Alyce Rogers; Kurt Equiluz; Wolfgang Schöne	Hänssler	1976	
J. S. Bach: Das Kantatenwerk • Complete Cantatas. Folge / Vol. 39	Gustav Leonhardt Collegium Vocale Gent Leonhardt-Consort	Soloist of the Tölzer Knabenchor; Paul Esswood; Kurt Equiluz; Max van Egmond	Teldec	1987	Period
J. S. Bach: Cantatas Vol. 4 – Man singet mit Freuden, Cantatas • 49 • 145 • 149 • 174 (Cantatas from Leipzig 1726–29)	Masaaki Suzuki Bach Collegium Japan	Aki Yanagisawa; Akira Tachikawa; Makoto Sakurada; Stephan Schreckenberger	BIS	1996	Period
J. S. Bach: Complete Cantatas Vol. 3	Ton Koopman Amsterdam Baroque Orchestra & Choir	Caroline Stam; Elisabeth von Magnus; Paul Agnew; Klaus Mertens	Antoine Marchand	1997	Period
Bach Edition Vol. 5 – Cantatas Vol. 2	Pieter Jan Leusink Holland Boys Choir Netherlands Bach Collegium	Ruth Holton; Sytse Buwalda; Nico van der Meel; Bas Ramselaar	Brilliant Classics	1999	Period
Bach Cantatas Vol. 27: Blythburgh/Kirkwell / For Whit Tuesday / For Trinity Sunday	John Eliot Gardiner Monteverdi Choir English Baroque Soloists	Ruth Holton; Daniel Taylor; Paul Agnew; Peter Harvey	Soli Deo Gloria	2000	Period
J. S. Bach: O heiliges Geist- und Wasserbad, BWV 165	Gotthold Schwarz Thomanerchor Gewandhausorchester	Heike Kumlin; Alexandra Röseler; Martin Krumbiegel; Gotthold Schwarz	MDR, (MDR-Figaro-Reihe Kantate)	2003	

== Bibliography ==
Scores

- O heilges Geist- und Wasserbad, BWV 165: Scores at the International Music Score Library Project
- "O heil'ges Geist- und Wasserbad BWV 165; BC A 90 / Sacred cantata (Trinity Sunday)". Bach Digital. 2014.

Books

- Dürr, Alfred (1971). Die Kantaten von Johann Sebastian Bach (in German). Vol. 1 (4 ed.). Deutscher Taschenbuchverlag. ISBN 3-423-04080-7.
- Dürr, Alfred (2006). The Cantatas of J. S. Bach: With Their Librettos in German-English Parallel Text. Translated by Richard D. P. Jones. Oxford University Press. ISBN 978-0-19-929776-4.
- Wolff, Christoph (2002). Johann Sebastian Bach: The Learned Musician. Oxford University Press. ISBN 978-0-393-32256-9.

Online sources

The complete recordings of Bach's cantatas are accompanied by liner notes from musicians and musicologists; Gardiner commented on his Bach Cantata Pilgrimage, Hofmann wrote for Masaaki Suzuki, and Wolff for Ton Koopman.

- Ambrose, Z. Philip (2012). "BWV 165 O heilges Geist- und Wasserbad". University of Vermont.
- Braatz, Thomas; Oron, Aryeh (2005). "Chorale Melodies used in Bach's Vocal Works / Nun laßt uns Gott dem Herren". Bach Cantatas Website.
- Browne, Francis (2007). "Nun laßt uns Gott dem Herren / Text and Translation of Chorale". Bach Cantatas Website.
- Dahn, Luke (2024). "Nun laßt uns Gott dem Herren / Text and Translation of Chorale". bach-chorales.com.
- Dellal, Pamela (2012). "BWV 165 – O heilges Geist- und Wasserbad". Emmanuel Music.
- Gardiner, John Eliot (2008). Johann Sebastian Bach (1685-1750) / Cantatas Nos 129, 165, 175, 176, 184 & 194 (Media notes). Soli Deo Gloria (at Hyperion Records website).
- Grob, Jochen (2014). "BWV 165 / BC A 90" (in German). s-line.de. Archived from the original on 2015-02-21.
- Hofmann, Klaus (1996). "BWV 165: O heilges Geist- und Wasserbad / (O Holy Spiritual and Water Bath)" (PDF). Bach Cantatas Website.
- Mincham, Julian (2010). "Chapter 62: BWV 165, O heilges Geist- und Wasserbad / Oh sacred spring and spirit". jsbachcantatas.com.
- Oron, Aryeh (2012). "Cantata BWV 165 O heilges Geist- und Wasserbad". Bach Cantatas Website.
- Werthemann, Helene (2015). "Bachkantaten in der Predigerkirche" (in German). Bachkantaten.
