= Bereitet die Wege, bereitet die Bahn, BWV 132 =

Church cantata by Johann Sebastian Bach

Bereitet die Wege, bereitet die Bahn
- BWV 132
- Church cantata by J. S. Bach
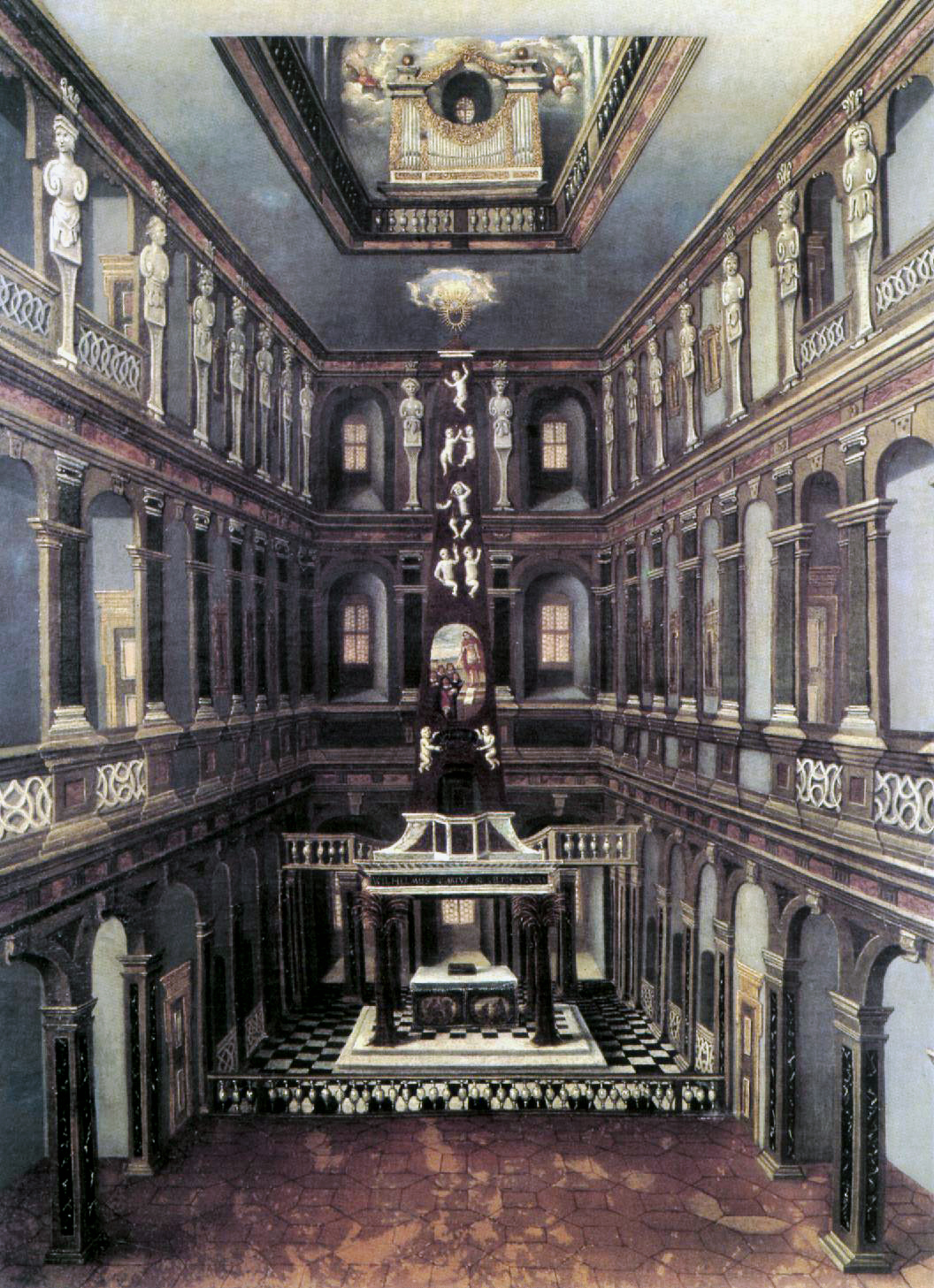
- The Schlosskirche in Weimar
- Occasion: Fourth Sunday in Advent
- Cantata text: Salomon Franck
- Chorale: Elisabeth Cruciger's "Herr Christ, der einig Gotts Sohn"
- Performed: 22 December 1715: Weimar
- Movements: 6
- Vocal: SATB choir and solo
- Instrumental: oboe; 2 violins; viola; cello; continuo

Johann Sebastian Bach composed the church cantata Bereitet die Wege, bereitet die Bahn (Prepare the paths, prepare the road), BWV 132, in Weimar in 1715 for the fourth Sunday of Advent and led the first performance on 22 December 1715.

Bach had taken up regular cantata composition a year before when he was promoted to concertmaster at the Weimar court, writing one cantata per month to be performed in the Schlosskirche, the court chapel in the ducal Schloss. Bereitet die Wege, bereitet die Bahn was his first cantata for the fourth Sunday in Advent. The libretto by the court poet Salomo Franck is related to the day's prescribed gospel reading, the testimony of John the Baptist. Franck derives from it thoughts about baptism as a preparation of the individual Christian who is addressed as a limb of Christ.

Bach structured the music in six movements of alternating arias and recitatives, and scored it for a small ensemble of four vocal parts, oboe, strings and continuo. The voices are combined only in the closing chorale, the fifth stanza of Elisabeth Cruciger's hymn "Herr Christ, der einig Gotts Sohn". The music of the chorale, which was possibly on a different sheet, is lost but can be replaced by a setting of the same stanza in a different cantata. In his composition, Bach follows Franck's Baroque imagery closely, illustrating for example the baptismal water.

== History and words ==
On 2 March 1714 Bach was appointed concertmaster of the Weimar court capelle of the co-reigning dukes Wilhelm Ernst and Ernst August of Saxe-Weimar. As concertmaster, he assumed the principal responsibility for composing new works, specifically cantatas for the Schlosskirche (palace church), on a monthly schedule. He wrote this cantata for the Fourth Sunday in Advent, dating it himself.

The prescribed readings for the Sunday were from the Epistle to the Philippians, "Rejoice in the Lord alway" (Philippians 4:4–7), and from the Gospel of John, the testimony of John the Baptist (John 1:19–28). The cantata text was written by the court poet Salomon Franck, published in the collection Evangelisches Andachts-Opffer in 1715. He included the fifth stanza of Elisabeth Cruciger hymn "Herr Christ, der einig Gotts Sohn" (1524). Franck paraphrases in the first aria the passage from the Book of Isaiah which is quoted in the prescribed gospel, "Bereitet dem Herrn den Weg" (Prepare the path for the Lord, Isaiah 40:3–4). The same passage from Isaiah appears in the beginning of Handel's Messiah. Franck also refers to the baptism as a way of preparation. The individual Christian is addressed as a limb of Christ.

Bach led the first performance of the cantata on 22 December 1715 in the ducal chapel. He could not revive the work in Leipzig because tempus clausum was observed there during Advent. The cantata was first published in 1881 in the Bach Gesellschaft edition, edited by Wilhelm Rust.

== Structure and scoring ==
Bach structured the cantata in six movements, alternating arias and recitatives, concluded by a chorale. As in several other cantatas on words by Franck, it is scored for a small ensemble of four vocal soloists (soprano (S), alto (A), tenor (T) and bass (B)), and a Baroque instrumental ensemble of oboe (Ob), two violins (Vl), viola (Va), cello (Vc) and basso continuo (Bc) including bassoon. A choir is only needed for the chorale, if at all. The title of the autograph score reads: "Dominicâ 4 Adventus Xsti Concerto. / Bereitet die Wege, bereitet die Bahn. / â 9. / 1 Hautbois. / 2 Violini / 1 Viola / Violoncello. / S:A:T:B: / col Basso per l'Organo / di / GSBach". The duration is given as 22 minutes. The music of the chorale is lost; it may have been noted in a simple setting on a separate sheet, as in the similar case of Nur jedem das Seine, BWV 163, composed four weeks earlier. For practical purposes the same verse, closing Ihr, die ihr euch von Christo nennet, BWV 164, in 1725, may be used.

In the following table of the movements, the scoring follows the Neue Bach-Ausgabe, and the abbreviations for voices and instruments the list of Bach cantatas. The keys and time signatures are taken from the Bach scholar Alfred Dürr, using the symbol for common time (4/4). The instruments are shown separately for winds and strings, while the continuo, playing throughout, is not shown.

Movements of Bereitet die Wege, bereitet die Bahn BWV 132
No.	Title	Text	Type	Vocal	Winds	Strings	Key	Time
1	Bereitet die Wege, bereitet die Bahn	Franck	Aria	S	Ob	2Vl Va	A major	6/8
2	Willst du dich Gottes Kind und Christi Bruder nennen	Franck	Recitative	T				common time
3	Wer bist du? Frage dein Gewissen	Franck	Aria	B		Vc	E major	common time
4	Ich will, mein Gott, dir frei heraus bekennen	Franck	Recitative	A		2Vl Va		common time
5	Christi Glieder, ach bedenket	Franck	Aria	A		Vl solo	B minor	common time
6	Ertöt uns durch deine Güte	Cruziger	Chorale	SATB	music lost			common time

== Music ==
=== 1 ===
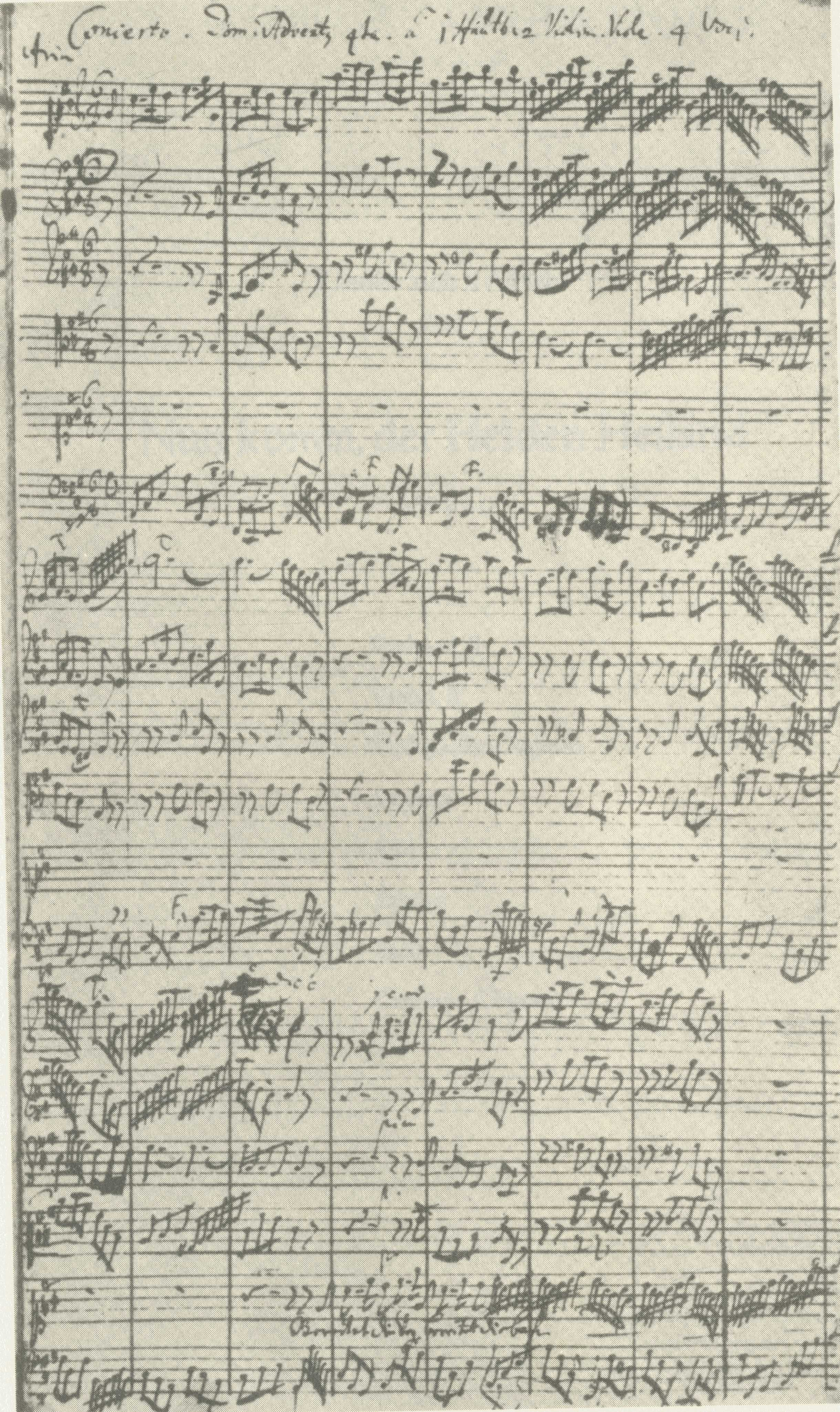
First page of the autograph score, titled "Concerto Dom. Adventus 4ta. â 1 Hautb. 2 Violini. Viola. 4 Voci.".

The first aria, "Bereitet die Wege, bereitet die Bahn!" (Prepare the paths, prepare the road!), is in da capo form in a 6/8 time signature, accompanied by the full ensemble. The soprano renders her calls to prepare the ways in melismas of several measures of semiquavers. John Eliot Gardiner, who conducted the Bach Cantata Pilgrimage in 2000, describes the character of the movement of "insouciant grace and fleet-footed buoyancy befitting a slowish gigue or a French loure." The oboe adds virtuoso figuration and trills, reminiscent of Bach's secular music. The aria is concluded by rejoicing calls: "Messias kömmt an" (The Messiah arrives).

=== 2 ===
The tenor recitative, "Willst du dich Gottes Kind und Christi Bruder nennen" (If you wish to be called God's child and Christ's brother), contains extended arioso passages, to stress "der Christen Kron und Ehre" (the Christians' crown and glory) and "Wälz ab die schweren Sündensteine" (back the heavy stones of sin). The voice and the continuo are at times set in imitation, an image for the Nachfolge (following), as they go together to express the unity achieved, on the words "daß er mit dir im Glauben sich vereine" (so that He may unite Himself to you in faith).

=== 3 ===
In the bass aria, "Wer bist du? Frage dein Gewissen" (Who are you? Ask your conscience), the question "Wer bist du?" (Who are you?), posed by the priests to St. John in the gospel, is given to the bass as the vox Christi, as if Jesus asked the listener this question. The cello often plays a "concertante role". Its first motif expresses the question and is repeated throughout the movement, and the vocal line is derived from it.

=== 4 ===
The expressive declamation of the alto recitative, "Ich will, mein Gott, dir frei heraus bekennen" (I would freely confess to You, my God), is highlighted by chords in the strings.

=== 5 ===
A solo violin accents the alto aria, "Christi Glieder, ach bedenket" (Christ's members, ah, consider), possibly inspired by the words "Christus gab zum neuen Kleide roten Purpur, weiße Seide" (Christ gave as new garments crimson robes, white silk). Gardiner interprets it as "the cleansing effect of baptismal water". The musicologist Julian Mincham supports that, stating: "Bach seldom neglects opportunities of creating musical images of cleansing water when mention is made of the act of baptism. This is the starting point of his invention of the violin obbligato melody".

=== 6 ===
The four-part setting of the closing chorale, "Ertöt uns durch deine Güte" (Mortify us through Your goodness), is lost, but can be taken from Ihr, die ihr euch von Christo nennet, BWV 164, transposed to A major.

== Recordings ==
The listing is taken from the selection on the Bach Cantatas Website. Choirs with one voice per part (OVPP) and instrumental groups playing period instruments in historically informed performances are marked by green background.

Recordings of Bereitet die Wege, bereitet die Bahn BWV 132
Title	Conductor / Choir / Orchestra	Soloists	Label	Year	Choir type	Instr.
J. S. Bach: Cantatas BWV 61 & BWV 132	Helmut Kahlhöfer Kantorei Barmen-Gemarke Deutsche Bachsolisten	Ingeborg Reichelt; Hildegard Rütgers; Theo Altmeyer; Eduard Wollitz	Bach Recordings	1966		
Bach Cantatas Vol. 1 – Advent and Christmas	Karl Richter Münchener Bach-Chor Münchener Bach-Orchester	Edith Mathis, Anna Reynolds; Peter Schreier; Theo Adam	Archiv Produktion	1972		
Die Bach Kantate Vol. 60	Helmuth Rilling Gächinger Kantorei Bach-Collegium Stuttgart	Arleen Augér; Helen Watts; Kurt Equiluz; Wolfgang Schöne	Hänssler	1977		
J. S. Bach: Das Kantatenwerk • Complete Cantatas • Les Cantates, Folge / Vol. 7	Gustav Leonhardt: Knabenchor Hannover; Collegium Vocale Gent; Leonhardt-Consort	Sebastian Hennig (soloist of the Knabenchor Hannover); René Jacobs; Marius van Altena; Max van Egmond	Teldec	1971		Period
J. S. Bach: Complete Cantatas Vol. 2	Ton Koopman Amsterdam Baroque Orchestra & Choir	Barbara Schlick; Kai Wessel; Christoph Prégardien; Klaus Mertens	Antoine Marchand	1995		Period
J. S. Bach: Cantatas Vol. 7	Masaaki Suzuki Bach Collegium Japan	Ingrid Schmithüsen; Yoshikazu Mera; Makoto Sakurada; Peter Kooy	BIS	1997		Period
Bach Edition Vol. 4 – Cantatas Vol. 1	Pieter Jan Leusink Holland Boys Choir Netherlands Bach Collegium	Ruth Holton; Sytse Buwalda; Knut Schoch; Bas Ramselaar	Brilliant Classics	1999		Period
Bach Cantatas Vol. Vol. 13: Köln/Lüneburg / For the 1st Sunday in Advent / For the 4th Sunday in Advent	John Eliot Gardiner Monteverdi Choir English Baroque Soloists	Brigitte Geller; Michael Chance; Jan Kobow; Dietrich Henschel	Soli Deo Gloria	2000		Period
J. S. Bach: Christmas Cantatas	Kevin Mallon Aradia Ensemble	Teri Dunn; Matthew White; John Tessier; Steven Pitkanen; Thomas Goerz	Naxos	2000	OVPP	Period
J. S. Bach: Cantatas for the Complete Liturgical Year Vol. 9	Sigiswald Kuijken La Petite Bande	Gerlinde Sämann; Petra Noskaiová; Christoph Genz; Jan van der Crabben	Accent	2008	OVPP	Period

== Sources ==
- Bereitet die Wege, bereitet die Bahn, BWV 132: Scores at the International Music Score Library Project
- Bereitet die Wege, bereitet die Bahn BWV 132; BC A 6 / Sacred cantata (4th Sunday of Advent) Bach Digital
- BWV 132 Bereitet die Wege, bereitet die Bahn: English translation, University of Vermont
