= Alles nur nach Gottes Willen, BWV 72 =

Church cantata by Johann Sebastian Bach

Alles nur nach Gottes Willen
- BWV 72
- Church cantata by J. S. Bach
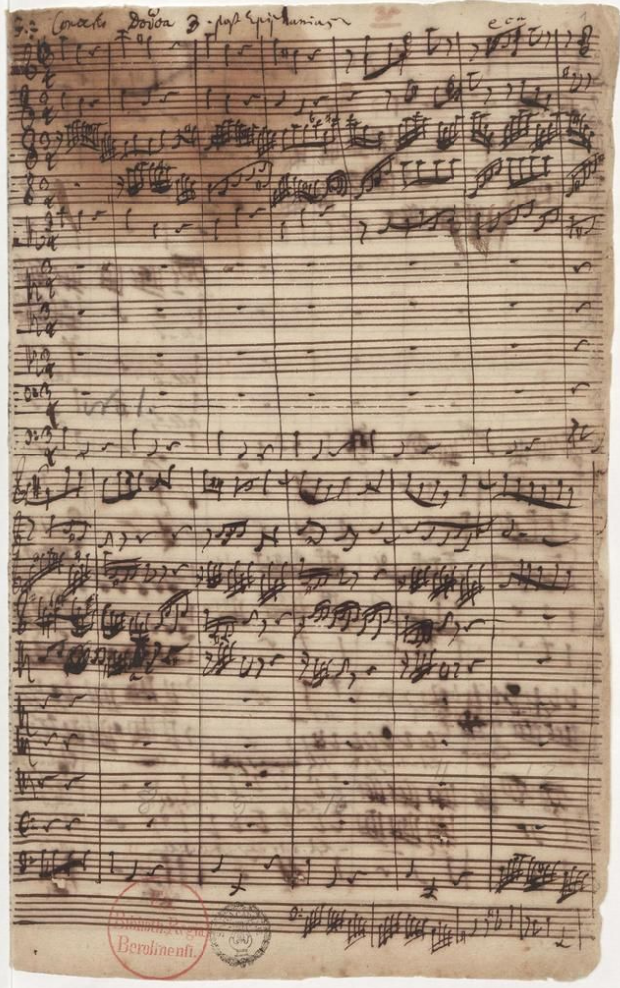
- First page of Bach's autograph score
- Related: basis for Missa, BWV 235
- Occasion: Third Sunday after Epiphany
- Cantata text: Salomon Franck
- Bible text: Matthew 8:2
- Chorale: "Was mein Gott will, das g'scheh allzeit"
- Performed: 27 January 1726: Leipzig
- Movements: 6
- Vocal: SATB choir; solo: soprano, alto and bass
- Instrumental: 2 oboes; 2 violins; viola; continuo

Alles nur nach Gottes Willen ('Everything according to God's will alone'), BWV 72, is a church cantata by Johann Sebastian Bach. He composed it in Leipzig in 1726 for the third Sunday after Epiphany and first performed it on 27 January 1726. It is part of his third cantata cycle and concluded the Christmas season. Bach later used the opening chorus for the Gloria of his Missa in G minor, BWV 235.

Bach composed the cantata in his third year as Thomaskantor, setting a libretto which Salomon Franck, his librettist at the ducal court in Weimar, had published in 1715. It is structured in six movements, an opening chorus, two pairs of recitative and aria, and a closing chorale, taken from "Was mein Gott will, das g'scheh allzeit", published by Albert, Duke of Prussia in 1547. The cantata is scored for three soloists, a four-part choir (SATB), and a Baroque instrumental ensemble of two oboes, strings and basso continuo.

== History and text ==
Bach composed Alles nur nach Gottes Willen in his third year as Thomaskantor (director of church music) in Leipzig for the Third Sunday after Epiphany. The prescribed readings for the Sunday were from the Epistle to the Romans, rules for living (Romans 12:17–21), and from the Gospel of Matthew, the healing of a leper (Matthew 8:1–13).

The cantata text was written by Salomon Franck, who was Bach's librettist during their time at the ducal court in Weimar. Franck published it in Evangelisches Andachts-Opffer in 1715, but Bach composed the music much later. Ulrich Leisinger, who edited the work for Carus, argues that if Bach had already composed it in Weimar, he might have used it in his first year in Leipzig, but he wrote a new cantata for the occasion then, Herr, wie du willt, so schicks mit mir, BWV 73. Bach had turned to older texts for the complete Christmas and Epiphany season of 1725/26, beginning with Unser Mund sei voll Lachens, BWV 110, for Christmas Day setting a text published by Georg Christian Lehms in 1711, and several more texts from the same collection. Ihr, die ihr euch von Christo nennet, BWV 164, is a comparable example of Bach turning to a text by Franck late.

The closing chorale "Was mein Gott will, das g'scheh allzeit" was written by Albert, Duke of Prussia in 1547. The chorale theme (Zahn 7568) by Claudin de Sermisy first appeared in print in the collection of secular songs Trente et quatre chansons in 1528. Bach had used the chorale before as the base for his chorale cantata Was mein Gott will, das g'scheh allzeit, BWV 111, composed for the same occasion in 1725.

Bach led the Thomanerchor in the cantata's first performance on 27 January 1726. He later used the opening chorus for the Gloria of his Missa in G minor, BWV 235.

== Music ==
=== Scoring and structure ===
Bach structured the cantata in six movements. Bach scored the work for three vocal soloists (soprano (S), alto (A) and bass (B)), a four-part choir, and a Baroque instrumental ensemble of two oboes (Ob), two violins (Vl), two obbligato violins (Vs), viola (Va) and basso continuo. The duration of the cantata is given as 20 minutes.

In the following table of the movements, the scoring follows the Neue Bach-Ausgabe. The keys and time signatures are taken from Alfred Dürr, using the symbol for common time (4/4). The continuo, playing throughout, is not shown.

Movements of Alles nur nach Gottes Willen
No.	Title	Text	Type	Vocal	Winds	Strings	Key	Time
1	Alles nur nach Gottes Willen	Franck	Chorus	SATB	2Ob	2Vl Va	A minor	3/4
2	O selger Christ, der allzeit seinen Willen	Franck	Recitative	A				common time
3	Mit allem, was ich hab und bin	Franck	Aria	A		2Vl	D minor	common time
4	So glaube nun	Franck	Recitative	B				common time
5	Mein Jesus will es tun, er will dein Kreuz versüßen	Franck	Aria	S	Ob	2Vl Va	C major	3/4
6	Was mein Gott will, das g'scheh allzeit	Albert, Duke of Prussia	Chorale	SATB	2Ob	2Vl Va	A minor	common time

=== Movements ===
Although Franck had marked the first movement as an aria, Bach composed it as a chorus, opened by a ritornello dominated by two-bar runs in the violins, later also in the continuo. The voices pick up the runs on the word "alles" (all), soprano first, and imitate each other one measure after the other, resulting in a complex image of "all". A rather quiet middle section on the words "Gottes Wille soll mich stillen" (God's will shall calm me) in canonic imitation is accompanied by the orchestra, the following words "bei Gewölk und Sonnenschein" (among clouds or sunshine) are illustrated by runs as at the beginning, but starting in a low range by the bass. The first and last sections end with the choir embedded in the ritornello.

In his arrangement for the Gloria of the Missa, Bach dropped the first ritornello, adapted the words "Gloria in excelsis Deo" to the first section, "Et in terra pax" to the middle section, and "Laudamus te" to the last section.

The first recitative begins as a secco, but develops to an arioso on the words "Herr, so du willt" (Lord, as you will), which are repeated nine times with a different continuo line, culminating in "so sterb ich nicht" (I will not die); the following line is again secco.

The following aria begins immediately with the voice, to ensure a connection between recitative and aria, followed by an unusual ritornello, a fugue with the two violins and the continuo. In the second aria, more like a song-and-dance movement, the instruments play a ritornello and repeat it after a short vocal passage: "Mein Jesus will es tun, er will dein Kreuz versüßen" (My Jesus will do it, He will sweeten Your cross). In the following main section the voice is embedded in the ritornello. The words of the middle section "Obgleich dein Herze liegt in viel Bekümmernissen" (Although your heart lies in many troubles) are sung in the minor mode. After the following ritornello the soloist repeats once more as a final statement, "mein Jesus will es tun!" (my Jesus will do it!).

The closing chorale is a four-part setting.

== Manuscripts and publication ==
The manuscript score are extant, held at the Berlin State Library, but its original title page is lost as well as a replacement that C. P. E. Bach made in 1750. Most original parts survived, also at the Berlin State Library, but a figured bass part is missing. Duplicate violin parts are held by the Berlin University of the Arts, and a figured bass part is kept by the Bach House Eisenach.

The first critical edition of the cantata, edited by Wilhelm Rust, was published by the Bach Gesellschaft in 1870 as part of its complete edition of Bach's works. In the Neue Bach-Ausgabe, the second edition of Bach's works, the cantata was published in 1997, edited by Peter Wollny. Carus published a critical edition in German and English as part of its Stuttgarter Bach-Ausgaben in 1997, edited by Ulrich Leisinger. In the 21st century, Bach Digital published high-resolution facsimile images of the manuscript parts from the first quarter of the 18th century.

== Recordings ==
The entries are taken from the listing on the Bach Cantatas website. Instrumental groups playing period instruments in historically informed performances are marked green under the header Instr..

Recordings of Alles nur nach Gottes Willen
Title	Conductor / Choir / Orchestra	Soloists	Label	Year	Instr.
Bach Made in Germany Vol. 1 – Cantatas III	Günther Ramin Thomanerchor Gewandhausorchester	boy soloists of the Thomanerchor; Hans Hauptmann	Leipzig Classics	1956	
Die Bach Kantate Vol. 24	Helmuth Rilling Figuralchor der Gedächtniskirche Stuttgart Bach-Collegium Stuttgart	Arleen Auger; Hildegard Laurich; Wolfgang Schöne	Hänssler	1972	
Les Grandes Cantates de J. S. Bach Vol. 29	Fritz Werner Heinrich-Schütz-Chor Heilbronn Württembergisches Kammerorchester Heilbronn	Ingeborg Reichelt; Barbara Scherler; Bruce Abel	Erato	1973	
J. S. Bach: Das Kantatenwerk • Complete Cantatas • Les Cantates, Folge / Vol. 4	Nikolaus Harnoncourt Tölzer Knabenchor Concentus Musicus Wien	boy soprano Wilhelm Wiedl; Paul Esswood; Ruud van der Meer	Teldec	1977	Period
Bach Edition Vol. 4 – Cantatas Vol. 1	Pieter Jan Leusink Holland Boys Choir Netherlands Bach Collegium	Ruth Holton; Sytse Buwalda; Bas Ramselaar	Brilliant Classics	1999	Period
J. S. Bach: Cantatas for the 3rd Sunday of Epiphany	John Eliot Gardiner Monteverdi Choir English Baroque Soloists	Joanne Lunn; Sara Mingardo; Stephen Varcoe	Archiv Produktion	2000	Period
J. S. Bach: Complete Cantatas Vol. 19	Ton Koopman Amsterdam Baroque Orchestra & Choir	Sandrine Piau; Bogna Bartosz; Klaus Mertens	Antoine Marchand	2002	Period
J. S. Bach: Cantatas Vol. 42 – BWV 13, 16, 32, 72	Masaaki Suzuki Bach Collegium Japan	Rachel Nicholls; Robin Blaze; Peter Kooy	BIS	2008	Period

== Cited sources ==
Bach Digital

- "Alles nur nach Gottes Willen BWV 72; BC A 37". Bach Digital. 2019.

Books

- Dürr, Alfred; Jones, Richard D. P. (2006). The Cantatas of J. S. Bach: With Their Librettos in German-English Parallel Text. Oxford University Press. pp. 207–210. ISBN 978-0-19-929776-4.
- Leisinger, Ulrich (July 1997). Alles nur nach Gottes Willen / All things be by God's commandment / BWV 72 (PDF). Carus-Verlag. pp. 3–4.

Online sources

- Dahn, Luke (2026). "BWV 72.6". bach-chorales.com.
- Dellal, Pamela (2020). "BWV 72 – Alles nur nach Gottes Willen". Emmanuel Music.
- Oron, Aryed (2026). "Cantata BWV 72 Alles nur nach Gottes Willen". Bach Cantatas.
- Steinitz, Margaret. Bach's Latin Church Music. London Bach Society. Archived from the original on 15 July 2011.
