= Tritt auf die Glaubensbahn, BWV 152 =

Church cantata by Johann Sebastian Bach

Tritt auf die Glaubensbahn
- BWV 152
- Church cantata; Dialogue cantata; by J. S. Bach
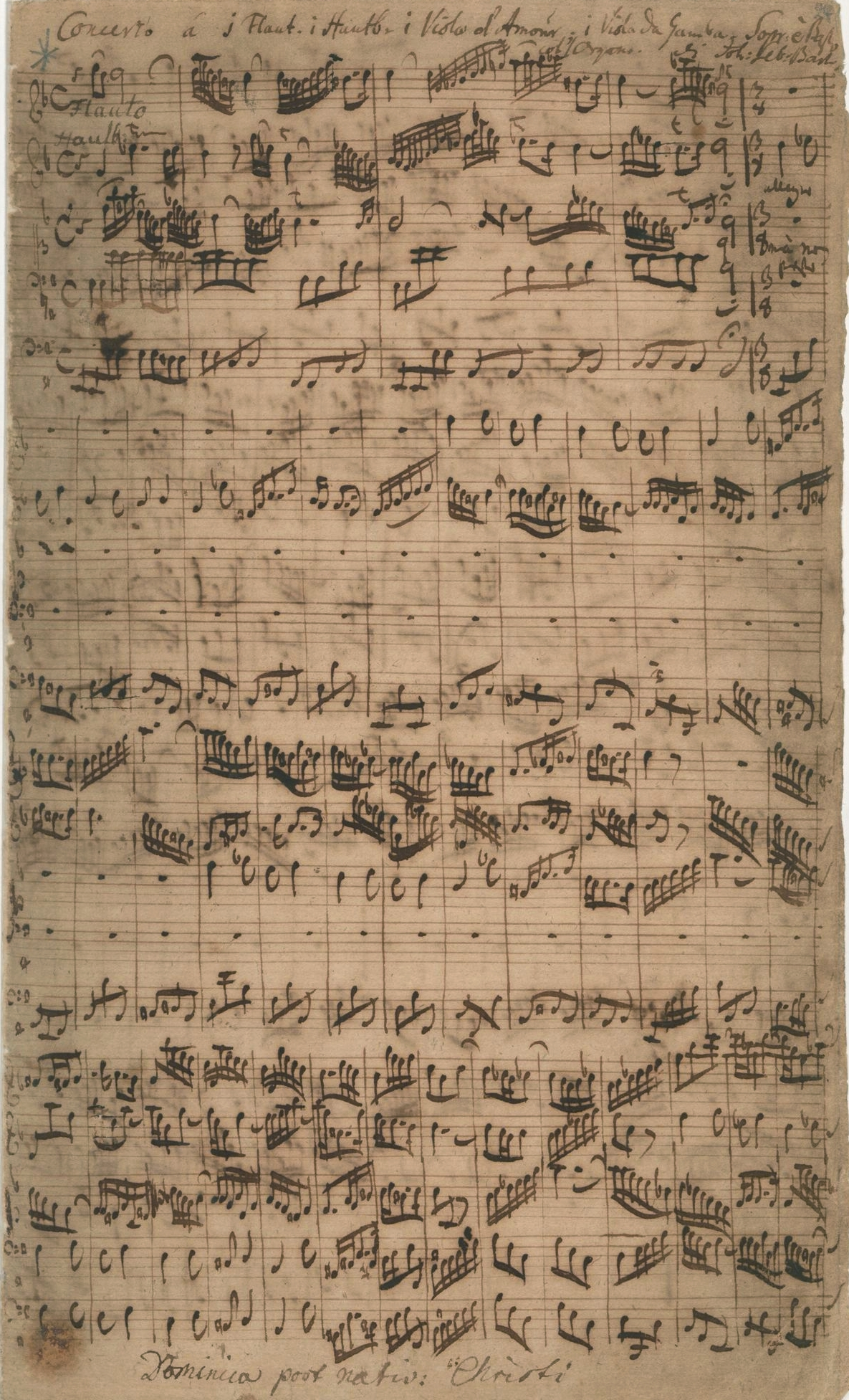
- Autograph manuscript of opening Sinfonia
- Occasion: Sunday after Christmas
- Cantata text: Salomon Franck
- Performed: 30 December 1714: Weimar
- Movements: 6
- Vocal: soprano and bass solo
- Instrumental: recorder; oboe; viola d'amore; viola da gamba; continuo

Tritt auf die Glaubensbahn (Step upon the path of faith), BWV 152, is a church cantata by Johann Sebastian Bach. He composed this dialogue cantata in Weimar for the Sunday after Christmas and first performed it on 30 December 1714.

== History and words ==
On 2 March 1714 Bach was appointed concertmaster of the Weimar court capelle of the co-reigning dukes Wilhelm Ernst and Ernst August of Saxe-Weimar. As concertmaster, he assumed the principal responsibility for composing new works, specifically cantatas for the Schlosskirche (palace church), on a monthly schedule. He composed the cantata for the Sunday after Christmas. The prescribed readings for the Sunday were from the Epistle to the Galatians, through Christ we are free from the law (Galatians 4:1–7), and from the Gospel of Luke, Simeon and Anna talking to Mary (Luke 2:33–40). The gospel is the passage following the canticle of Simeon. The cantata text was written by Salomon Franck, the Weimar court poet, who published it in Evangelisches Andachts-Opffer in 1715. The gospel refers to Isaiah (Isaiah 8:14–15) and Psalm 118 (Psalms 118:22), mentioning "a stone of stumbling and for a rock of offence" and the "stone which the builders refused". The poet refers to it, stating that God laid the stone of foundation, and man should not take offence. Jesus is then addressed as a stone beyond all gems. The cantata text is a dialogue of Jesus and the Soul and concludes with a duet, asking to reject the "world" and follow Jesus. This cantata is the earliest extant example of a dialogue, used again in Bach's third annual cycle of cantatas written in Leipzig.

Bach first performed the cantata on 30 December 1714.

== Scoring and structure ==
The cantata in six movements is scored for two soloists—soprano and bass—and four solo instruments: recorder, oboe, viola d'amore, viola da gamba and basso continuo. Bach himself wrote in the extant score "Concerto à 1 Flaut. 1 Hautb. 1 Viola d'Amour. 1 Viola da Gamba. Sopr. è Baßo coll' Organo." The cantata is Bach's only one using the viola d'amore.

1. Sinfonia
2. Aria (bass): Tritt auf die Glaubensbahn
3. Recitative (bass): Der Heiland ist gesetzt
4. Aria (soprano): Stein, der über alle Schätze
5. Recitative (bass): Es ärgre sich die kluge Welt
6. Duet (soprano, bass): Wie soll ich dich, Liebster der Seelen, umfassen?

== Music ==
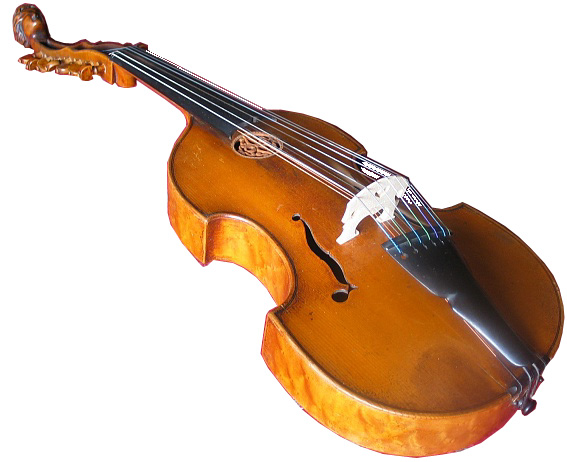
Viola d'amore

The cantata is intimate chamber music for only two voices, soprano and bass, and four solo instruments. Christoph Wolff notes the "colourful and delicate effects achievable with these forces".

The opening sinfonia in two sections is reminiscent of a French overture, which Bach had used with a meaning in Nun komm, der Heiden Heiland, BWV 61, a few weeks earlier. The theme of the fugue is similar to that of Bach's fugue for organ, BWV 536. The fugue is one of few instrumental fugues in Bach's cantatas.

The first aria is given to the bass, who invites the Soul (and the listener) to "step upon the path of faith". It is accompanied by an obbligato oboe and seems to illustrate the path (Glaubensbahn) in scales. The recitative is divided in two sections, following the contrast of "böse Welt" (evil world) and "seliger Christ" (blessed Christian) in recitative and arioso. The words "zum Fall" (for destruction) (literally: for fall) is pictured in a downward leap of a tenth. The second aria, sung by the soprano, is like a prayer. The middle section is only four measures long, and the da capo repeat is shortened. The voice is accompanied by recorder and viola d'amore.

The final duet, a love duet of Jesus and the Soul, is structured in sections, separated by parts of the ritornello which is repeated completely in the end. Each section contains first dialogue, then a canon illustrating unity. Klaus Hofmann notes: "With its dance rhythm, reminiscent of a gigue, the music delightfully illustrates the image of the heart turning to holy unity".

== Recordings ==
- Les Grandes Cantates de J. S. Bach Vol. 15, Jürgen Jürgens, Leonhardt-Consort, Agnes Giebel, Jacques Villisech, Telefunken 1964
- Bach Kantaten, Vol. 3: BWV 63, BWV 40, BWV 152, Diethard Hellmann, Bachorchester Mainz, Agnes Giebel, Jakob Stämpfli, DdM-Records Mitterteich late 1960s?
- Die Bach Kantate Vol. 64, Helmuth Rilling, Gächinger Kantorei, Bach-Collegium Stuttgart, Arleen Augér, Wolfgang Schöne, Hänssler 1976
- J. S. Bach: Das Kantatenwerk · Complete Cantatas · Les Cantates, Folge / Vol. 37 – BWV 152–156, Nikolaus Harnoncourt, Concentus Musicus Wien, soloist of the Tölzer Knabenchor, Thomas Hampson, Teldec 1985
- J. S. Bach: Kantaten, Jérôme Lejeune, Ricercar Consort, Greta De Reyghere, Max van Egmond, Teldec 1985
- J. S. Bach: Complete Cantatas Vol. 2, Ton Koopman, Amsterdam Baroque Orchestra, Barbara Schlick, Klaus Mertens, Antoine Marchand 1995
- J. S. Bach: Cantatas Vol. 5 – Cantatas from Leipzig 1723 – BWV 18, 143, 152, 155, 161, Masaaki Suzuki, Bach Collegium Japan, Midori Suzuki, Peter Kooy, BIS 1997
- Bach Edition Vol. 15 – Cantatas Vol. 14, Pieter Jan Leusink, Netherlands Bach Collegium, Ruth Holton, Bas Ramselaar, Brilliant Classics 2000
- Bach Cantatas Vol. 16: New York / For the Sunday after Christmas, John Eliot Gardiner, English Baroque Soloists, Gillian Keith, Peter Harvey, Soli Deo Gloria 2000
- Bach: Dialogue Cantatas · Dialogkantaten, Rainer Kussmaul, Berliner Barock Solisten, Dorothea Röschmann, Thomas Quasthoff, Deutsche Grammophon 2007

== Sources ==
- Tritt auf die Glaubensbahn, BWV 152: Scores at the International Music Score Library Project
- Tritt auf die Glaubensbahn BWV 152; BC A 18 / Sacred cantata (1st Sunday of Christmas) Leipzig University
- Cantata BWV 152 Tritt auf die Glaubensbahn history, scoring, sources for text and music, translations to various languages, discography, discussion, Bach Cantatas Website
- BWV 152 Tritt auf die Glaubensbahn English translation, University of Vermont
- BWV 152 Tritt auf die Glaubensbahn text, scoring, University of Alberta
