= Der Himmel lacht! Die Erde jubilieret, BWV 31 =

Church cantata by Johann Sebastian Bach

Der Himmel lacht! Die Erde jubilieret
- BWV 31
- Church cantata by J. S. Bach
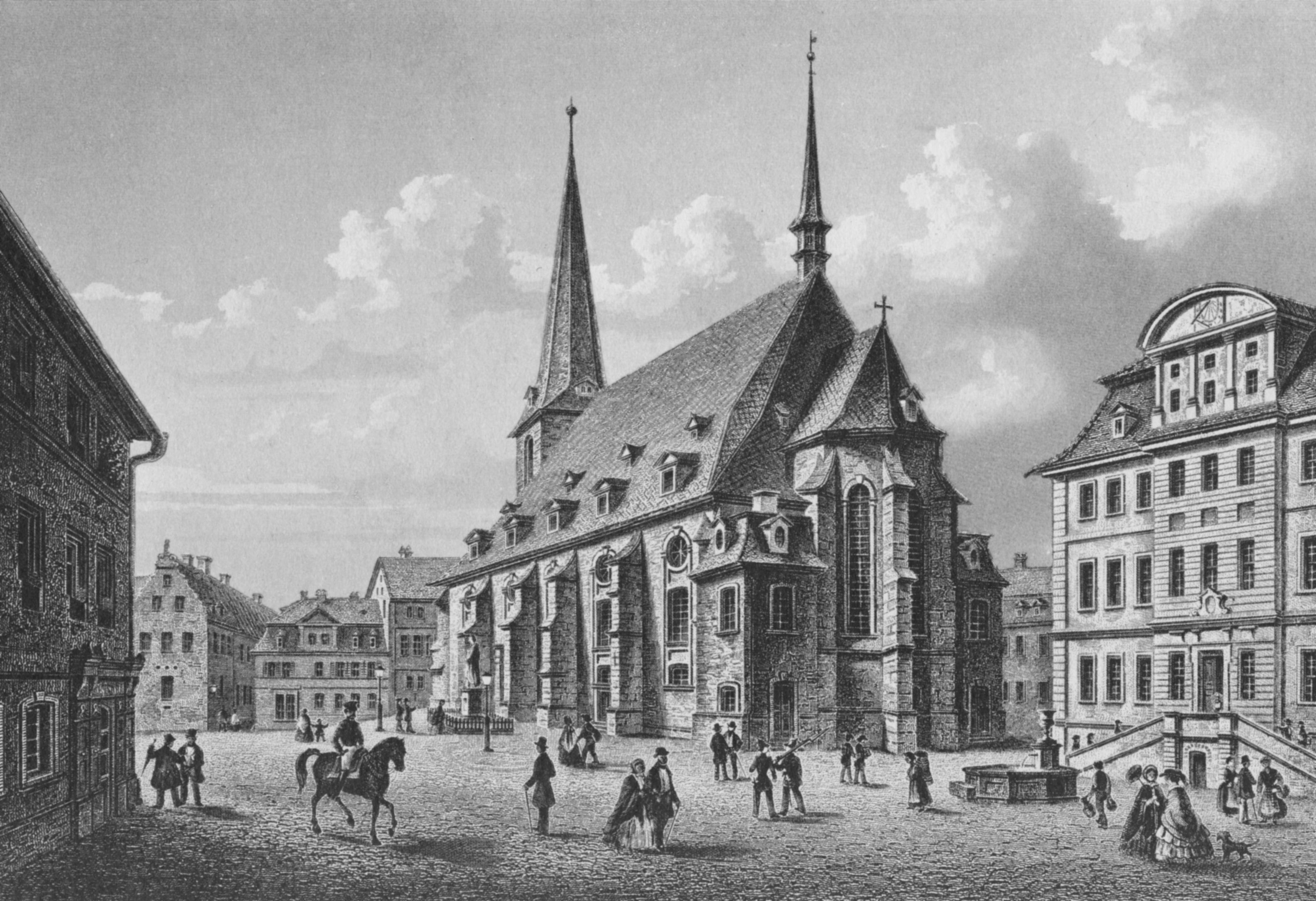
- St. Peter und Paul, Weimar, probably the location of the first performance
- Occasion: First Day of Easter
- Cantata text: Salomon Franck
- Chorale: by Nikolaus Herman
- Performed: 21 April 1715: Weimar
- Movements: 9
- Vocal: five-part choir (SSATB); solo: soprano, tenor and bass
- Instrumental: 3 trumpets; timpani; 3 oboes; taille; bassoon; 2 violins; 2 violas; 2 cellos; continuo

Der Himmel lacht! Die Erde jubilieret (Heaven laughs! Earth exults), BWV 31, is a church cantata by Johann Sebastian Bach for the first day of Easter. Bach composed the cantata in Weimar and first performed it on 21 April 1715.

== History and words ==
On 2 March 1714 Bach was appointed concertmaster of the Weimar court capelle of the co-reigning dukes Wilhelm Ernst and Ernst August of Saxe-Weimar. As concertmaster, he assumed the principal responsibility for composing new works, specifically cantatas for the Schloßkirche (palace church), on a monthly schedule. Bach composed the cantata for Easter Sunday in 1715. The prescribed readings for the feast day were from the First letter to the Corinthians, "Christ is our Easter lamb" (1 Corinthians 5:6–8), and from the Gospel of Mark, the Resurrection of Jesus (Mark 16:1–8). The text was written by the Weimar poet Salomon Franck who published it in Evangelisches Andachts-Opffer (Evangelical Devotional Offering). The verses consist purely of free poetry and interpret the Easter message, connected to the request to believers to let Jesus also be resurrected within their souls. The final movement, the last verse of the chorale "Wenn mein Stündlein vorhanden ist" (When my hour is come) by Nikolaus Herman, expresses the desire to die, to follow Jesus in resurrection.

Bach first performed the cantata on 21 April 1715. Looking at the rich scoring of three instrumental groups and a five-part choir, John Eliot Gardiner suggests that the cantata was not performed in the court's small Schloßkirche, but in the town church St. Peter und Paul, where the ducal family evidently at times attended services. Bach later performed the cantata several times in Leipzig in a slightly modified form. There is proof of performances for the years 1724 and 1731; a further performance in 1735 is probable as well. Since the Weimar tuning of the organ, which served as a reference for the string instruments, was probably a third higher than the standard tuning tone in Leipzig, Bach had to either leave out the voices of the reed instruments or rewrite them for the Leipzig performances, or to replace the parts by different instruments.

== Scoring and structure ==
The cantata in nine movements is festively scored for three vocal soloists (soprano, tenor and bass), a five-part choir (SSATB), three trumpets, timpani, three oboes, taille (tenor oboe), bassoon, two violins, two violas, two cellos and basso continuo. The scoring for five parts in the choir, five parts in the woodwinds and six parts in the strings is unusual.

Movements of Der Himmel lacht! Die Erde jubilieret
No.	Title	Type	Vocal	Winds	Strings	Brass	Percussion	Key	Time
1		Sonata		3 oboes, taille, bassoon	2 violins, 2 violas, 2 cellos, basso continuo	3 trumpets	Timpani	C major	6/8
2	Der Himmel lacht! Die Erde jubilieret	Chorus	SSATB	3 oboes, taille, bassoon	2 violins, 2 violas, 2 cellos, basso continuo	3 trumpets	Timpani	C major	common time
3	Erwünschter Tag!	Recitative	Bass		1 cello, basso continuo				common time
4	Fürst des Lebens, starker Streiter	Aria	Bass		1 cello, basso continuo			C major	common time
5	So stehe dann, du gottergebne Seele	Recitative	Tenor		1 cello, basso continuo				common time
6	Adam muss in uns verwesen	Aria	Tenor		2 violins, 2 violas, 2 cellos, basso continuo			G major	common time
7	Weil dann das Haupt sein Glied	Recitative	Soprano		1 cello, basso continuo				common time
8	Letzte Stunde, brich herein	Aria	Soprano	1 oboe	2 violins, 2 violas, 1 cello, basso continuo			C major	3/4
9	So fahr ich hin zu Jesu Christ	Chorale	SSATB	3 oboe, taille, bassoon	2 violins, 2 violas, 2 cellos, basso continuo	1 trumpet		C major	common time

== Music ==
The festive character of the work is demonstrated by a sonata with a fanfare-like introduction, a concerto of the three groups brass, reeds and strings, all divided in many parts. The first choral movement, sung by a five-part chorus, evokes the "celestial laughter and worldly jubilation" of the text, according to John Eliot Gardiner, who continues:

the dance-propelled rhythms and the trumpet-edged brilliance look forward to the Gloria from the B minor Mass, even to the slowing down of tempo and silencing of the brass when the words speak of Christ's release from the tomb.

The bass voice announces the resurrection of Jesus in a recitative and continues in an aria, both accompanied only by the continuo. The aria, marked Molto adagio, praises Jesus as "Prince of life" and "strong fighter".

The higher tenor voice addresses in a recitative the soul to look to the "new life in spirit", followed by a bright aria, accompanied by the strings, which speaks of "der neue Mensch" (the new man), free from sin.

The highest voice, the soprano, sings in the first person as the soul in a recitative, convinced of taking part in the resurrection. In the last aria, soprano and solo oboe in echo-effects contrast with low-lying unison strings, which already anticipate the closing chorale's melody. The hymn is a "death-bed chorale", set for a four-part choir, crowned by a descant from the trumpet and first violin.

== Recordings ==
- The RIAS Bach Cantatas Project (1949–1952), Karl Ristenpart, RIAS-Kammerchor, RIAS-Kammerorchester, Lilo Rolwes, Helmut Krebs, Gerhard Niese, Audite 1950
- J. S. Bach: Cantata No. 31; Seven Easter Chorales, Felix Prohaska, Wiener Kammerchor, Wiener Kammerorchester, Anny Felbermayer, Waldemar Kmentt, Walter Berry, Bach Guild 1952
- J. S. Bach: Cantata BWV 31 & Magnificat BWV 243, Marcel Couraud, Stuttgarter Bach-Chor, Badische Staatskapelle, Friederike Sailer, Fritz Wunderlich, August Messthaler, Philips 1956
- Les Grandes Cantates de J. S. Bach Vol. 17, Fritz Werner, Heinrich-Schütz-Chor Heilbronn, Pforzheim Chamber Orchestra, Agnes Giebel, Helmut Krebs, Erich Wenk, Erato 1963
- J. S. Bach: Das Kantatenwerk · Complete Cantatas · Les Cantates, Folge / Vol. 9, Nikolaus Harnoncourt, Wiener Sängerknaben, Chorus Viennensis, Concentus Musicus Wien, soloists of the Wiener Sängerknaben, Kurt Equiluz, Siegmund Nimsgern, Teldec 1973
- Bach Made in Germany Vol. 4 – Cantatas VII, Hans-Joachim Rotzsch, Thomanerchor, Gewandhausorchester, Helga Termer, Eberhard Büchner, Hermann Christian Polster, Eterna 1976
- J. S. Bach: Complete Cantatas Vol. 1, Ton Koopman, Amsterdam Baroque Orchestra & Choir, Barbara Schlick, Guy de Mey, Klaus Mertens, Antoine Marchand 1994
- J. S. Bach: Cantatas Vol. 6 – BWV 21, 31, Masaaki Suzuki, Bach Collegium Japan, Monika Frimmer, Gerd Türk, Peter Kooy, BIS 1997
- Bach Cantatas Vol. 22: Eisenach / For Easter Sunday / For Easter Monday / For Easter Monday / For Easter Tuesday, John Eliot Gardiner, Monteverdi Choir, English Baroque Soloists, Gillian Keith, James Gilchrist, Stephen Varcoe, Soli Deo Gloria 2000
- Bach Edition Vol. 21 – Cantatas Vol. 12, Pieter Jan Leusink, Holland Boys Choir, Netherlands Bach Collegium, Ruth Holton, Nico van der Meel, Bas Ramselaar, Brilliant Classics 2000
