= Himmelskönig, sei willkommen, BWV 182 =

Church cantata by Johann Sebastian Bach

Himmelskönig, sei willkommen
- BWV 182
- Church cantata by J. S. Bach
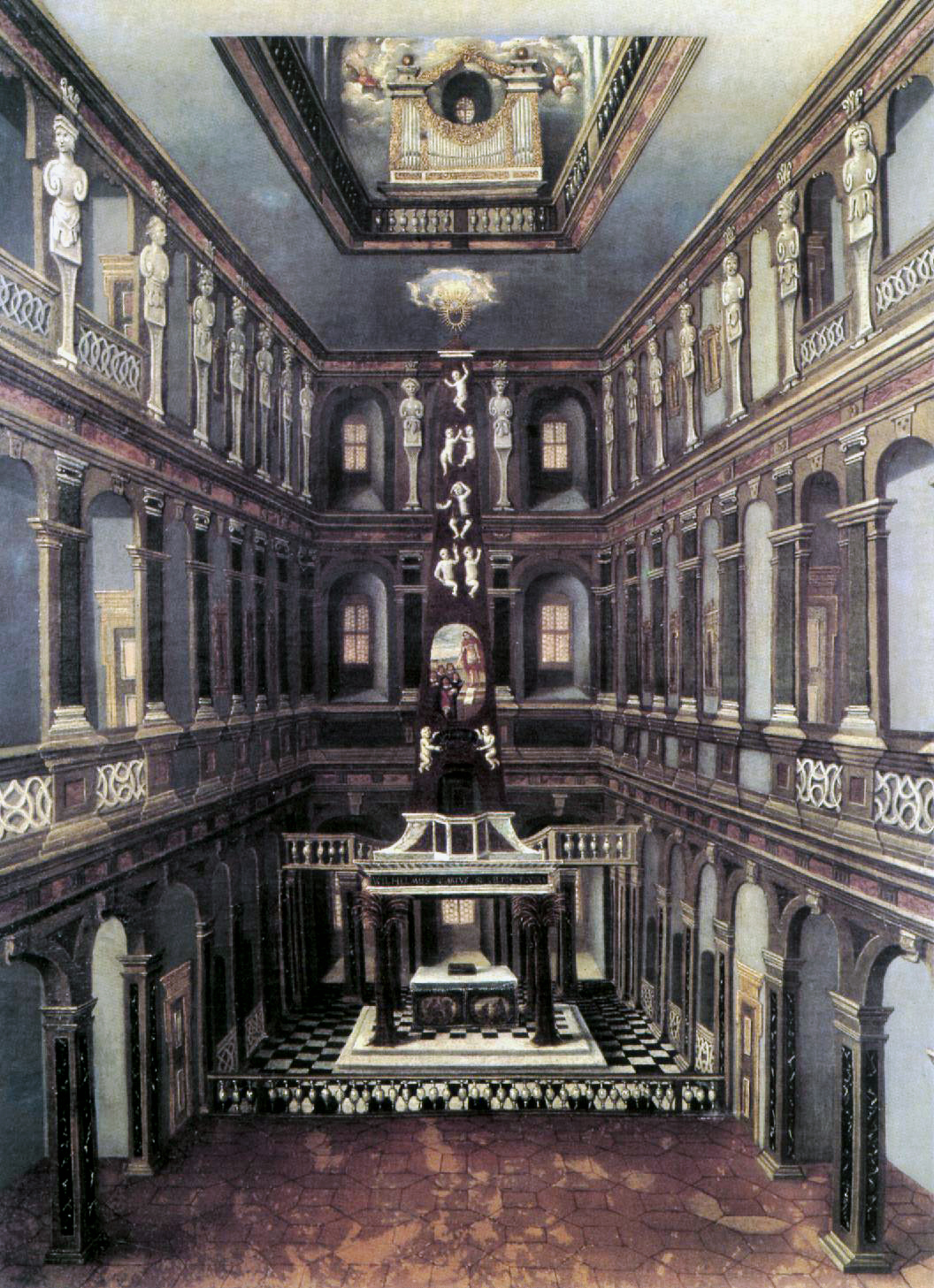
- The Schlosskirche in Weimar
- Occasion: Palm Sunday; Annunciation
- Cantata text: Salomon Franck
- Chorale: Jesu Leiden, Pein und Tod by Paul Stockmann
- Performed: 25 March 1714: Weimar
- Movements: 8
- Vocal: SATB choir; solo: alto, tenor and bass
- Instrumental: recorder; 2 violins; 2 violas; continuo

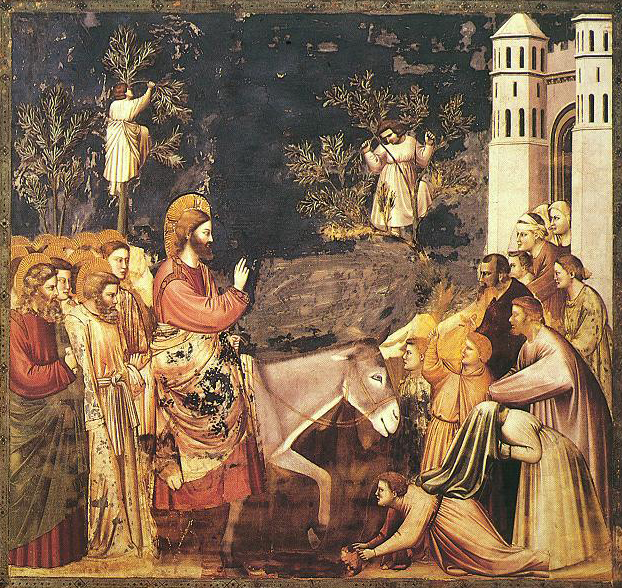
Giotto: Entry into Jerusalem

Himmelskönig, sei willkommen (King of Heaven, welcome), BWV 182, is a church cantata by Johann Sebastian Bach. He composed it in Weimar for Palm Sunday, and first performed it on 25 March 1714, which was also the feast of the Annunciation that year.

== History and words ==
In Weimar, Bach was the court organist of Johann Ernst von Sachsen-Weimar. On 2 March 1714, he was promoted to Konzertmeister, an honour which included a monthly performance of a church cantata in the Schlosskirche. According to Bach scholar Alfred Dürr, this cantata is Bach's first cantata in a series which was meant to cover all Sundays within four years. However, Widerstehe doch der Sünde, BWV 54 has also been proposed as the first. In any event, BWV 182 preceded Weinen, Klagen, Sorgen, Zagen, BWV 12.

Bach composed the cantata for the Marian feast of the Annunciation, always celebrated on 25 March, which fell on Palm Sunday in 1714. Other than in Leipzig, where tempus clausum was observed during Lent and no cantatas were permitted, Bach could perform in Weimar a cantata especially meant for the entry of Jesus into Jerusalem. The prescribed readings for the day were from the Epistle to the Philippians, "everyone be in the spirit of Christ" (Philippians 2:5–11), or from the First Epistle to the Corinthians, "of the Last Supper" (1 Corinthians 11:23–32), and from the Gospel of Matthew, the entry into Jerusalem (Matthew 21:1–9).

The poetry was written by the court poet Salomon Franck, although the work is not found in his printed editions. Bach's biographer Philipp Spitta concluded this from stylistic comparison and observing a lack of recitatives between arias. The poetry derives from the entry into Jerusalem a similar entry into the heart of the believer, who should prepare himself and will be given heavenly joy in return. The language intensifies the mystical aspects: Himmelskönig (King of Heaven), "Du hast uns das Herz genommen" (You have taken our hearts from us), "Leget euch dem Heiland unter" (Lay yourselves beneath the Savior). The chorale in movement 7 is the final stanza 33 of Paul Stockmann's hymn for Passiontide "Jesu Leiden, Pein und Tod" (1633).

A da capo sign after the last aria in some parts suggests that originally the cantata was meant to be concluded by a repeat of the opening chorus.

Bach first performed it in the Schlosskirche on Palm Sunday, 25 March 1714. As Bach could not perform the cantata in Leipzig on Palm Sunday, he used it on the feast of the Annunciation on 25 March 1724, which had coincided with Palm Sunday for the first performance as well. He performed it in Leipzig two more times.

== Structure and scoring ==
The cantata in eight movements is scored for alto, tenor, and bass soloists, a four-part choir, recorder, two violins, two violas and basso continuo.

1. Sonata
2. Chorus: Himmelskönig, sei willkommen
3. Recitative (bass): Siehe, ich komme, im Buch ist von mir geschrieben
4. Aria (bass): Starkes Lieben
5. Aria (alto): Leget euch dem Heiland unter
6. Aria (tenor): Jesu, laß durch Wohl und Weh
7. Chorale: Jesu, deine Passion ist mir lauter Freude
8. Chorus: So lasset uns gehen in Salem der Freuden

== Music ==
The cantata is intimately scored to match the church building. An instrumental Sonata in the rhythm of a French Overture depicts the arrival of the King. (In his cantata Nun komm, der Heiden Heiland, BWV 61, for Advent that same year on the same reading, Bach went further and set a chorus in the form of such an overture). The recorder and a solo violin are accompanied by pizzicato in the divided violas and the continuo. The first chorus is in da capo form, beginning with a fugue, which leads to a homophonic conclusion. The middle section contains two similar canonic developments.

The following biblical quotation is set as the only recitative of the cantata. It is given to the bass as the vox Christi (voice of Christ) and expands to an arioso. The instrumentation of the three arias turns from the crowd in the Biblical scene to the individual believer, the first accompanied by violin and divided violas, the second by a lone recorder, the last only by the continuo.

The chorale is arranged as a chorale fantasia in the manner of Pachelbel; every line is first prepared in the lower voices, then the soprano sings the cantus firmus, while the other voices interpret the words, for example by fast movement on "Freude" (joy). The closing chorus is, according to conductor John Eliot Gardiner, "a sprightly choral dance that could have stepped straight out of a comic opera of the period".

== Recordings ==
- Les Grandes Cantates de J. S. Bach Vol. 9, Fritz Werner, Heinrich-Schütz-Chor Heilbronn, Pforzheim Chamber Orchestra, Claudia Hellmann, Helmut Krebs, Erich Wenk, Erato 1961
- J. S. Bach: Kantaten 106 · 182, Jürgen Jürgens, Monteverdi-Chor Hamburg, Leonhardt Consort, Julia Falk, Bert van t'Hoff, Jacques Villisech, Telefunken 1963
- Bach Cantatas Vol. 2 – Easter, Karl Richter, Münchener Bach-Chor, Münchener Bach-Orchester, Alto: Anna Reynolds, Peter Schreier, Theo Adam, Archiv Produktion 1975
- Die Bach Kantate Vol. 29, Helmuth Rilling, Gächinger Kantorei, Bach-Collegium Stuttgart, Doris Soffel, Aldo Baldin, Philippe Huttenlocher, Hänssler 1975
- J. S. Bach: Das Kantatenwerk – Sacred Cantatas Vol. 9, Nikolaus Harnoncourt, Tölzer Knabenchor, Concentus Musicus Wien, Paul Esswood, Kurt Equiluz, Robert Holl, Teldec 1988
- J. S. Bach: Complete Cantatas Vol. 2, Ton Koopman, Amsterdam Baroque Orchestra & Choir, Kai Wessel, Christoph Prégardien, Klaus Mertens, Antoine Marchand 1995
- J. S. Bach: Christ lag in Todesbanden; Lobet den Herrn; Himmelskönig sei willkommen, Philippe Pierlot, Choeur de Chambre de Namur, Ricercar Consort, Steve Dugardin, Ian Honeyman, Max van Egmond, Ricercar 1995
- Cantata BWV 182, Masaaki Suzuki, Bach Collegium Japan, Yoshikazu Mera, Makoto Sakurada, Peter Kooy, BIS 1996
- Bach Cantatas Vol. 21: Cambridge/Walpole St Peter, John Eliot Gardiner, Monteverdi Choir, English Baroque Soloists, Nathalie Stutzmann, James Gilchrist, Peter Harvey, Soli Deo Gloria 2000

== Sources ==
- Himmelskönig, sei willkommen, BWV 182: performance by the Netherlands Bach Society (video and background information)
- Himmelskönig, sei willkommen, BWV 182: Scores at the International Music Score Library Project
- Himmelskönig, sei willkommen BWV 182; BC A 53 / A 172 / Sacred cantata (Palm Sunday) Bach Digital
- Literature by and about Himmelskönig, sei willkommen, BWV 182 in the German National Library catalogue
- Cantata BWV 182 Himmelskönig, sei willkommen: history, scoring, sources for text and music, translations to various languages, discography, discussion, Bach Cantatas Website
- BWV 182 Himmelskönig, sei willkommen: English translation, University of Vermont
- BWV 182 Himmelskönig, sei willkommen: text, scoring, University of Alberta
