= Mein Gott, wie lang, ach lange? BWV 155 =

Church cantata by Johann Sebastian Bach

Mein Gott, wie lang, ach lange?
- BWV 155
- Church cantata by J. S. Bach
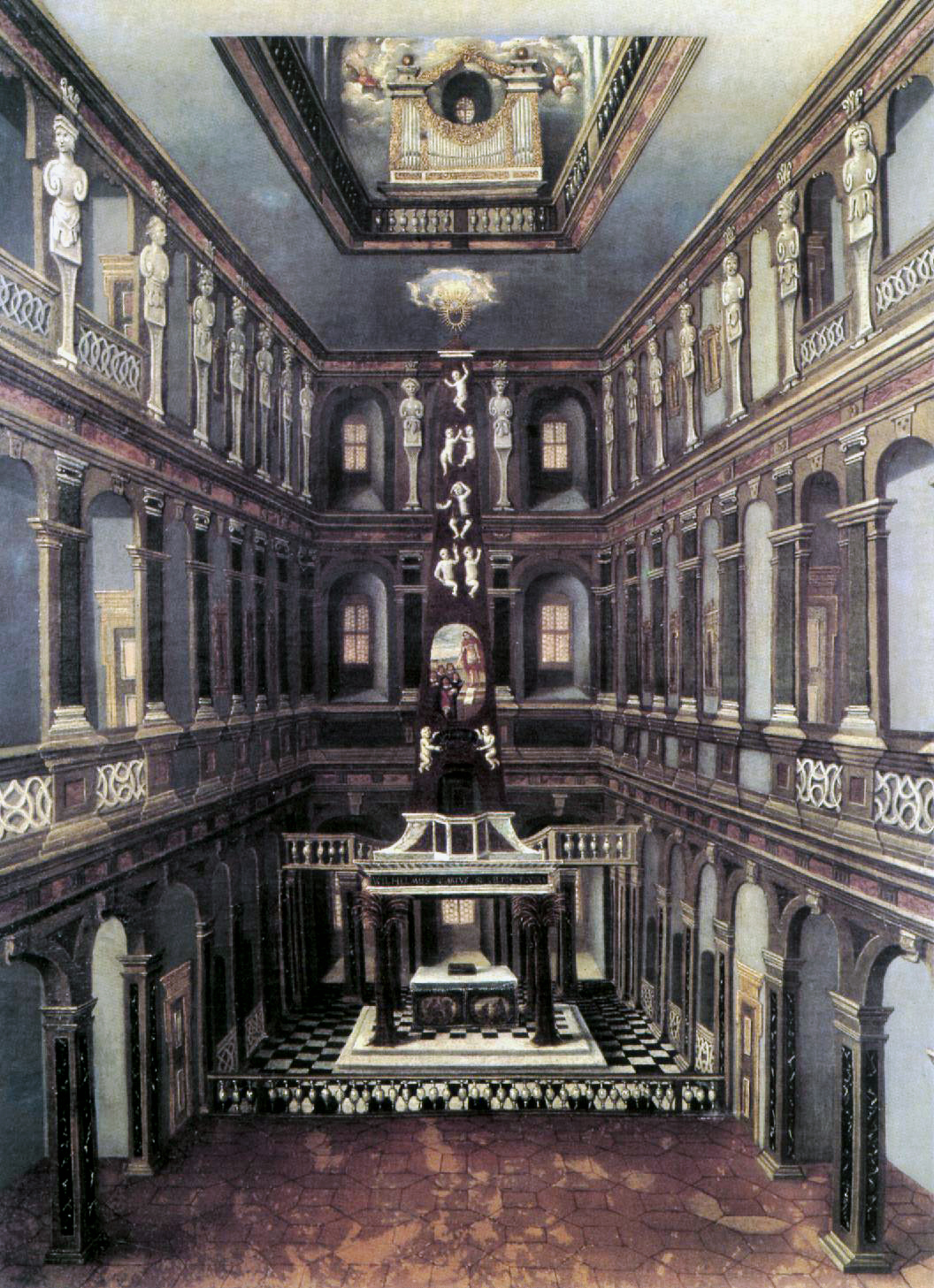
- The Schlosskirche in Weimar
- Occasion: Second Sunday after Epiphany
- Cantata text: Salomon Franck
- Chorale: "Es ist das Heil uns kommen her"
- Performed: 19 January 1716: Weimar
- Movements: 5
- Vocal: SATB soloists and choir
- Instrumental: bassoon; 2 violins; viola; continuo

Mein Gott, wie lang, ach lange? (My God, how long, ah, how long), BWV 155, is a church cantata by Johann Sebastian Bach. He first performed it in Weimar on the second Sunday after Epiphany, on 19 January 1716.

== History and words ==
On 2 March 1714 Bach was appointed concertmaster of the Weimar court capelle of the co-reigning dukes Wilhelm Ernst and Ernst August of Saxe-Weimar. As concertmaster, he assumed the principal responsibility for composing new works, specifically cantatas for the Schlosskirche (palace church or ducal chapel), on a monthly schedule. He wrote this cantata for the Second Sunday after Epiphany.

The prescribed readings for the Sunday were taken from the Epistle to the Romans, "We have several gifts" (Romans 12:6–16), and from the Gospel of John, the Marriage at Cana (John 2:1–11). The cantata text was written by the court poet Salomon Franck and published in 1715 in Evangelisches Andachts-Opffer. He expanded one thought from the gospel: Jesus is still hidden, but the "soul" may trust that he will appear at the right time. The poet uses images of wine to allude to the miracle at the marriage, such as "Der Tränen Maß wird stets voll eingeschenket, der Freuden Wein gebricht" (that the measure of tears is always fully granted, the wine of joy is lacking). The closing chorale is stanza 12 of "Es ist das Heil uns kommen her" by Speratus.

Bach first performed the cantata on 19 January 1716 in the ducal chapel. He performed it again in a revised version in his first year in Leipzig on 16 January 1724.

== Scoring and structure ==
Similar to other Weimar cantatas, the work is scored for soprano, alto, tenor and bass soloists, a four-part choir for the chorale only if at all, an obbligato bassoon, two violins, viola, and basso continuo. It is structured in five movements.

1. Recitative (soprano): Mein Gott, wie lang, ach lange?
2. Aria (alto, tenor): Du mußt glauben, du mußt hoffen
3. Recitative (bass): So sei, o Seele, sei zufrieden
4. Aria (soprano): Wirf, mein Herze, wirf dich noch
5. Chorale: Ob sich's anließ, als wollt er nicht

== Music ==
The opening recitative, speaking of longing and waiting, expands expressively on a throbbing pedal point of 11 measures, moving only on the words "der Freuden Wein gebricht" mentioning "joy" (the lack of joy, though), only to sink back for the final "Mir sinkt fast alle Zuversicht" (almost all my confidence has drained away). In the following duet, an unusual obbligato bassoon plays virtuoso figurations in a wide range of two and one half octaves (including a truly remarkable G0), whereas the voices sing together, for most of the time in homophony. Movement 3 speaks words of consolation. Bach chose the bass as the vox Christi (voice of Christ) to deliver them, almost as an arioso on the words "Damit sein Gnadenlicht dir desto lieblicher erscheine" (so that the light of His grace might shine on you all the more brightly). In the final aria, lively dotted rhythms in the strings and later in the voice illustrate "Wirf, mein Herze, wirf dich noch in des Höchsten Liebesarme" (Throw yourself, my heart, only throw yourself into the loving arms of the Highest), the rhythms even appear in the continuo several times, while the strings rest on long chords. The tune of an Easter chorale from the 15th century closes the cantata in a four-part setting.

== Recordings ==
- Die Bach Kantate Vol. 22, Helmuth Rilling, Gächinger Kantorei, Bach-Collegium Stuttgart, Ingeborg Reichelt, Norma Lerer, Friedrich Melzer, Hanns-Friedrich Kunz, Hänssler 1971
- J. S. Bach: Das Kantatenwerk – Sacred Cantatas Vol. 8, Nikolaus Harnoncourt, Tölzer Knabenchor, Concentus Musicus Wien, soprano soloist of the Tölzer Knabenchor, Paul Esswood, Kurt Equiluz, Thomas Hampson, Teldec 1985
- J. S. Bach: Complete Cantatas Vol. 3, Ton Koopman, Amsterdam Baroque Orchestra & Choir, Caroline Stam, Elisabeth von Magnus, Paul Agnew, Klaus Mertens, Antoine Marchand 1995
- J. S. Bach: Cantatas Vol. 5, Masaaki Suzuki, Bach Collegium Japan, Midori Suzuki, Yoshikazu Mera, Makoto Sakurada, Peter Kooy, BIS 1997
- Bach Cantatas Vol. 19: New York, John Eliot Gardiner, Monteverdi Choir, English Baroque Soloists, Joanne Lunn, Richard Wyn Roberts, Julian Podger, Gerald Finley, Soli Deo Gloria 2000

== Sources ==
- Mein Gott, wie lang, ach lange? BWV 155: performance by the Netherlands Bach Society (video and background information)
- Mein Gott, wie lang, ach lange, BWV 155: Scores at the International Music Score Library Project
- Mein Gott, wie lang, ach lange BWV 155; BC A 32 / Sacred cantata (2nd Sunday of Epiphany) Bach Digital
- Cantata BWV 155 Mein Gott, wie lang, ach lange history, scoring, sources for text and music, translations to various languages, discography, discussion, Bach Cantatas Website
- BWV 155 Mein Gott, wie lang, ach lange English translation, University of Vermont
- BWV 155 Mein Gott, wie lang, ach lange text, scoring, University of Alberta
- Luke Dahn: BWV 155.5 bach-chorales.com
