= Nur jedem das Seine, BWV 163 =

Church cantata by Johann Sebastian Bach

Nur jedem das Seine
- BWV 163
- Church cantata by J. S. Bach
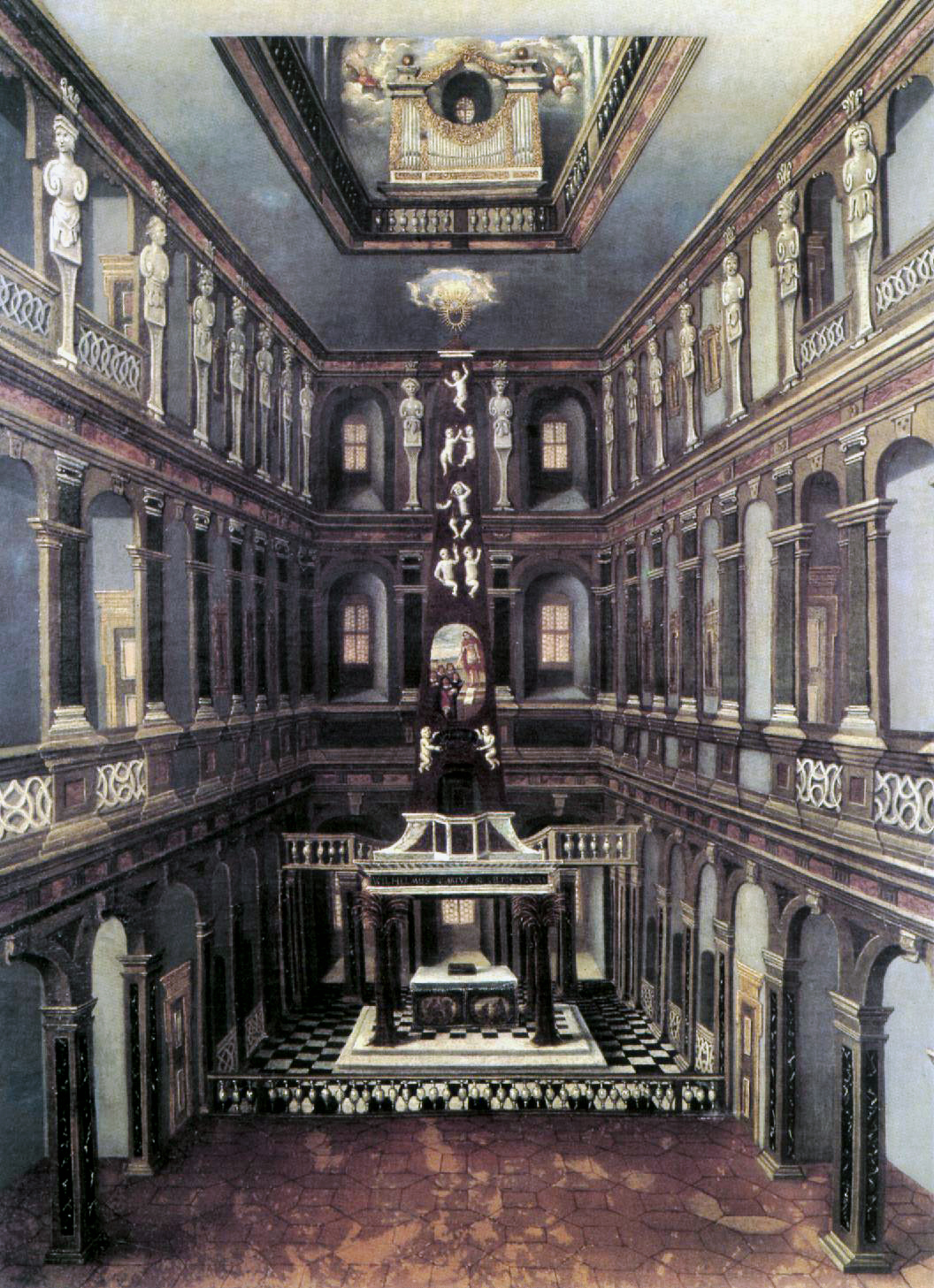
- The Schlosskirche in Weimar
- Occasion: 23rd Sunday after Trinity
- Cantata text: Salomon Franck
- Chorale: by Johann Heermann
- Performed: 24 November 1715: Weimar
- Movements: 6
- Vocal: SATB solo and choir
- Instrumental: 2 violins; viola; 2 cellos; continuo

Nur jedem das Seine (To each his own!), BWV 163, (Note: "BWV" is Bach-Werke-Verzeichnis, a thematic catalogue of Bach's works.) is a church cantata by Johann Sebastian Bach. He composed the work in Weimar for the twenty-third Sunday after Trinity and first performed it on 24 November 1715.

This work was part of Bach's sequence of monthly church cantatas for the Weimar court, which he began in 1714. It was the first piece performed after a mourning period of several months for Prince Johann Ernst. The text, written by the court poet Salomon Franck, is based on the prescribed gospel reading for the Sunday, "Render unto Caesar...", and includes several allusions to money and gold. The cantata has six movements, beginning with an aria for tenor, followed by two pairs of recitatives and arias, one for bass and the other for the duet of soprano and alto, and a concluding chorale. Similar to other cantatas on words by Franck, the work is scored for a small Baroque chamber ensemble of two violins, viola, two cellos and continuo. Bach composed a unique aria with a dark texture of a bass voice and two obbligato cellos. A duet has been described as a love duet and compared to operatic duets. The music of the closing chorale is lost, except for the continuo part. It is not clear if Bach set the stanza printed in the libretto from Heermann's "Wo soll ich fliehen hin", or instead his "Meinen Jesum laß ich nicht" by Christian Keymann, in a tune that appears as a cantus firmus in movement 5.

== History and text ==
On 2 March 1714 Bach was appointed concertmaster of the Weimar court orchestra (Kapelle) of the co-reigning dukes Wilhelm Ernst and Ernst August of Saxe-Weimar. As concertmaster, he assumed the principal responsibility for composing new works, specifically cantatas for the Schlosskirche (palace church), on a monthly schedule. Bach composed the cantata in 1715 for the 23rd Sunday after Trinity. The prescribed readings for the Sunday were from the Epistle to the Philippians, "our conversation is in heaven" (Philippians 3:17–21), and from the Gospel of Matthew, the question about paying taxes, answered by "Render unto Caesar..." (Matthew 22:15–22). The librettist was Salomon Franck, the court poet in Weimar. He began with a paraphrase of the famous answer "Render unto Caesar" from the gospel, and included several allusions to money and gold (he was also the numismatist of the Weimar court). Franck included a stanza from a hymn by Johann Heermann as the sixth and last movement of this cantata, according to the printed libretto the final stanza of "Wo soll ich fliehen hin" (1630). The music of that chorale is lost; only the continuo part has survived. Recent scholarship found that Bach possibly chose to set a stanza from Heermann's "Meinen Jesum lass ich nicht" instead, in a tune he used instrumentally in movement 5, which would match the continuo part.

Bach led the first performance on 24 November 1715. It was the first cantata performed after a period of mourning for Prince Johann Ernst from August to November. No account is extant of a later performance in Leipzig, but the Bach scholar Christoph Wolff writes: "it seems safe to assume that it was [revived]".

== Scoring and structure ==
The cantata is structured in six movements, beginning with an aria for tenor (T), followed by two pairs of recitative and aria, one for bass (B), the other for the duet of soprano (S) and alto (A), and a concluding chorale when all four parts are united. As with several other cantatas on words by Franck, it is scored for a small Baroque chamber ensemble of two violins (Vl), viola (Va), two cellos (Vc) and basso continuo (Bc).

In the following table of the movements, the scoring, keys and time signatures are taken from Alfred Dürr, using the symbol for common time (4/4). The instruments are shown separately for winds and strings, while the continuo, playing throughout, is not shown.

Movements of Nur jedem das Seine, BWV 163
No.	Title	Text	Type	Vocal	Instruments	Key	Time
1	Nur jedem das Seine	Franck	Aria	T	Vl VA Vc	B minor	common time
2	Du bist, mein Gott, der Geber aller Gaben	Franck	Recitative	B			common time
3	Lass mein Herz die Münze sein	Franck	Aria	B	2Vc	E minor	common time
4	Ich wollte dir	Franck	Duet recitative	S A			common time
5	Nimm mich mir und gib mich dir	Franck	Duet aria	S A	2Vl Va	D major	3/4
6	Führ auch mein Herz und Sinn	Heermann	Chorale	SATB		D major	common time

== Music ==
The opening da capo aria for tenor is based on a paraphrase of "Render to Caesar": "Nur jedem das Seine". The aria features an unusual ritornello in which the strings assume a motif introduced by the continuo, which is then repeated several times through all parts. The movement is a da capo aria emphasizing dualism and debt. Craig Smith remarks that it is "almost academic in its metrical insistence".

The second movement is a secco bass recitative, "Du bist, mein Gott, der Geber aller Gaben" (You are, my God, the Giver of all gifts). It has been described as "operatic in its intensity and subtle adjustments of character". The recitative is remarkable for its "aggressive, even belligerent" conclusion.

The following bass aria, "Laß mein Herz die Münze sein" (Let my heart be the coin), has an unusual and unique accompaniment of two obbligato cellos with continuo. The cellos present an imitative motif to introduce the bass. John Eliot Gardiner, who conducted the Bach Cantata Pilgrimage in 2000, comments that Bach "conjures up an irresistible picture of two coin-polishers at work, a sort of eighteenth-century sorcerer goading his apprentice", observing that "two cellos polish away in contrary motion with wide intervalic leaps". Bach was interested in coins and precious metals. The conductor Craig Smith compares the dark texture to the "descent into the earth in Wagner's Das Rheingold". The aria is in three thematic sections: "enjoining", "melodramatically rhetoric", and "imprecatory".

The fourth movement is a soprano and alto duet recitative, "Ich wollte dir, o Gott, das Herze gerne geben" (I would gladly, o God, give you my heart). It is rhythmically metrical and presents five sections based on mood and text. The recitative is "high and light but very complicated in its myriad of detail".

The duet aria, "Nimm mich mir und gib mich dir!" (Take me from myself and give me to You!), again for soprano and alto, is in triple time. The tune of Johann Heermann's hymn "Meinen Jesum lass ich nicht" (I will not let go of my Jesus) is interwoven in the texture as a cantus firmus of the upper strings in unison. The movement is a "love duet" characterized by "antiphonal avowals of commitment" to God rather than a carnal desire. The musicologist Julian Mincham compares its presentation to Monteverdi's L'incoronazione di Poppea. The movement begins with sparse scoring and becomes more richly textured as it progresses, adding the chorale tune.

The final movement, possibly "Führ auch mein Herz und Sinn" (Also lead my heart and mind), is a four-part chorale setting, marked "Chorale in semplice stylo"; however, only the continuo line is extant. While the libretto shows that a stanza from Heermann's "Wo soll ich fliehen hin" was to be used, sung to a melody by Christian Friedrich Witt, the Bach scholar Andreas Glöckner found that the continuo part matches the tune in the previous movement, which appeared in a hymnal published by Witt.

== Recordings ==
- Amsterdam Baroque Orchestra & Choir, Ton Koopman. J. S. Bach: Complete Cantatas Vol. 3. Erato, 1995.
- Bach Collegium Japan, Masaaki Suzuki. J. S. Bach: Cantatas Vol. 4. BIS, 1996.
- Gächinger Kantorei / Bach-Collegium Stuttgart, Helmuth Rilling. Die Bach Kantate. Hänssler, 1977.
- Holland Boys Choir / Netherlands Bach Collegium, Pieter Jan Leusink. Bach Edition Vol. 11. Brilliant Classics, 1999.
- Monteverdi Choir / English Baroque Soloists, John Eliot Gardiner. Bach Cantatas Vol. 12. Soli Deo Gloria, 2000.
