= Ihr, die ihr euch von Christo nennet, BWV 164 =

Church cantata by Johann Sebastian Bach

Ihr, die ihr euch von Christo nennet
- BWV 164
- Church cantata by J. S. Bach
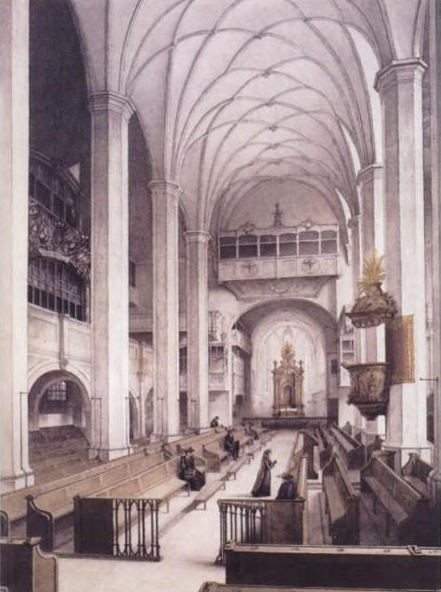
- Thomaskirche, Leipzig
- Occasion: 13th Sunday after Trinity
- Cantata text: Salomon Franck
- Chorale: Herr Christ, der einig Gotts Sohn
- Performed: 26 August 1725: Leipzig
- Movements: six
- Vocal: SATB solo and choir
- Instrumental: 2 flauto traverso; 2 oboes; 2 violins; viola; continuo

Johann Sebastian Bach composed the church cantata Ihr, die ihr euch von Christo nennet (You, who call yourselves of Christ), BWV 164 in Leipzig for the 13th Sunday after Trinity and first performed it on 26 August 1725.

== History and words ==
Bach wrote the cantata in his third year in Leipzig for the 13th Sunday after Trinity. He used a cantata text written by Salomon Franck in Weimar, published in Evangelisches Andachts-Opffer in 1715, as he had done already in Tue Rechnung! Donnerwort, BWV 168, four weeks before. The prescribed readings for the Sunday were from the Epistle to the Galatians, Paul's teaching on law and promise (Galatians 3:15–22), and from the Gospel of Luke, the parable of the Good Samaritan (Luke 10:23–37). The love of one's neighbour is the dominant theme of this cantata, whereas in the two preceding years the cantata texts of Du sollt Gott, deinen Herren, lieben, BWV 77, and Allein zu dir, Herr Jesu Christ, BWV 33, had stressed the equality of loving God and neighbour. The closing chorale is the fifth (and last) verse of Elisabeth Cruciger's hymn "Herr Christ, der einig Gotts Sohn" (1524).

Bach first performed the cantata on 26 August 1725.

== Scoring and structure ==
As in several other cantatas on words of Franck, the setting is intimate: soprano, alto, tenor and bass soloists, two flauto traverso, two oboes, two violins, viola, and basso continuo. A four-part choir is only needed for the closing chorale, if at all. The cantata is in six movements:

1. Aria (tenor): Ihr, die ihr euch von Christo nennet
2. Recitative (bass): Wir hören zwar, was selbst die Liebe spricht
3. Aria (alto): Nur durch Lieb und durch Erbarmen
4. Recitative (tenor): Ach, schmelze doch durch deinen Liebesstrahl
5. Duet (soprano, bass): Händen, die sich nicht verschließen
6. Chorale: Ertöt uns durch dein Güte

== Music ==
The music for four soloists and a few instruments is essentially chamber music. Bach sets the arias in forms which deviate from the standard da capo aria. In the tenor aria the strings and the voice share a theme, which appears in two similar halves, A B A' B'. In the alto aria, accompanied by sighing motifs in the flutes, the second section is repeated rather than the first, A B B'. In the duet Bach achieves a quartet, adding to soprano and bass voice the high instruments in unison and the continuo. The text is presented in three sections and repeated completely in a fourth section, which imitates the first. The closing chorale is a four-part setting.

== Recordings ==
- Die Bachkantate Vol. 49, Helmuth Rilling, Gächinger Kantorei, Bach-Collegium Stuttgart, Edith Wiens, Julia Hamari, Lutz-Michael Harder, Walter Heldwein, Hänssler 1982
- J. S. Bach: Das Kantatenwerk – Sacred Cantatas Vol. 9, Gustav Leonhardt, Tölzer Knabenchor, Collegium Vocale Gent, Leonhardt-Consort, soloist of the Tölzer Knabenchor, Edith Wiens, Paul Esswood, Kurt Equiluz, Max van Egmond, Teldec 1987
- Bach Cantatas Vol. 6, John Eliot Gardiner, Monteverdi Choir, English Baroque Soloists, Gillian Keith, Nathalie Stutzmann, Christoph Genz, Jonathan Brown, Soli Deo Gloria 2000
- J. S. Bach: Complete Cantatas Vol. 18, Ton Koopman, Amsterdam Baroque Orchestra & Choir, Johannette Zomer, Bogna Bartosz, Christoph Prégardien, Klaus Mertens, Antoine Marchand 2002
- J. S. Bach: Cantatas for the Complete Liturgical Year Vol. 5, Sigiswald Kuijken, La Petite Bande, Gerlinde Sämann, Petra Noskaiová, Jan Kobow, Dominik Wörner, Accent 2006
- J. S. Bach: Cantatas Vol. 40, Masaaki Suzuki, Bach Collegium Japan, Yukari Nonoshita, Robin Blaze, Makoto Sakurada, Peter Kooy, BIS 2007

== Sources ==
- Ihr, die ihr euch von Christo nennet, BWV 164: Scores at the International Music Score Library Project
- Ihr, die ihr euch von Christo nennet BWV 164; BC A 128 / Sacred cantata (13th Sunday after Trinity) Bach Digital
- Cantata BWV 164 Ihr, die ihr euch von Christo nennet history, scoring, sources for text and music, translations to various languages, discography, discussion, Bach Cantatas Website
- BWV 164 Ihr, die ihr euch von Christo nennet English translation, University of Vermont
- BWV 164 Ihr, die ihr euch von Christo nennet text, scoring, University of Alberta
- Chapter 4 BWV 164 Ihr, die ihr euch von Christo nennet / You, who have taken Christ’s name. Julian Mincham, 2010
- Luke Dahn: BWV 164.6 bach-chorales.com
