= Johann Christian Köpping =

Johann Christian Köpping (1704 – 1772) was a German curator, best known as an assistant of J. S. Bach.

Born in Großbothen, Köpping started his education at the Thomasschule, Leipzig, before Bach's arrival in the city. He was a "Thomaner" from 1718 to 1726, studying under Bach between 1723 and 1726. He later became the curator of the Thomasschule. In the 1720s he assisted Bach as a copyist, and produced the only known copy of a score of O heilges Geist- und Wasserbad, BWV 165 in 1724.
