= Alexandra Röseler =

German opera singer

Alexandra Röseler is a German operatic mezzo-soprano and pianist. She won the 1988 Klassik Stiftung Weimar. After a period studying at the University of Magdeburg from 1992, she began a career as a concert pianist, performing for example Schumann's Piano Concerto. By the late 1990s, she had furthered her studies, studying vocal performance under Regina Werner at the University of Music and Theatre Leipzig. Röseler has since appeared in numerous recordings and recitals of baroque music as a mezzo-soprano and alto and has performed regularly with the Thomanerchor. In 2003 she recorded Bach's cantata, O heilges Geist- und Wasserbad, BWV 165, with Gotthold Schwarz, Thomanerchor, Gewandhausorchester, Heike Kumlin and Martin Krumbiegel, singing the alto part.
