= Salomon Franck =

German lawyer, scientist, and poet (1659–1725)

- Born: 6 March 1659; Weimar
- Died: 11 July 1725 (aged 66); Weimar
- Other name: Salomo Franck
- Occupations: lawyer, scientist, poet
- Known for: collaboration with Johann Sebastian Bach
- Notable work: librettist of some of the best-known Bach cantatas

Salomon (also Salomo) Franck, 6 March 1659 – 11 July 1725), was a German lawyer, scientist, and poet. Franck was working at Weimar at the same time as the composer Johann Sebastian Bach and he was the librettist of some of the best-known Bach cantatas.

== Biography ==
Franck was born in Weimar. After studying law and theology at Jena he held government posts at Zwickau, Arnstadt, Jena and Weimar, where he died. Records show that, as of 1702, Franck was secretary of the high Consistory, managing the numismatic collection and the library records for the court of Duke of Saxe-Weimar, William Ernest.

Franck had already written several secular cantata texts prior to his association with Johann Sebastian Bach, e.g. Himmelsflammende Wunschopfer, which was performed at Weimar castle in 1697. Franck also wrote many sacred texts. His earliest church-cantata texts were written in the older form, consisting of verses from the Bible and strophic songs. In 1711 he used for the first time the new form introduced by Erdmann Neumeister.

In 1717, Franck published a collection of sacred texts titled Evangelische Sonn- und Festtages Andachten auf Hochfürstliche Gnädigste Verordnung zur Fürstlich Sächsischen Weimarischen Hof-Capell-Music in Geistlichen Arien erwecket von Salomon Francken, Fürstlich Sächsischen Gesamten Ober-Consistorial-Secretario in Weimar. Weimar und Jena bey Johann Felix Bielcken. 1717.

=== Collaboration with Bach ===
He wrote the text for Bach's earliest secular cantata (1713), Was mir behagt, ist nur die muntre Jagd (BWV 208) in which, following the custom of the day, he drew upon mythological characters. The cantata was composed for the 31st birthday celebration of Duke Christian of Sachsen-Weissenfels.

It is not known for sure when he began collaborating with Bach on sacred cantatas, as the author of some texts used by Bach is unknown. However, the collaboration between Franck and Bach was particularly active from 1714, when the composer was promoted to the post of Konzertmeister at Weimar, and embarked on the composition of cantatas for the Schlosskirche (court chapel) on a regular monthly basis. Bach adopted the new form of cantata, composing recitatives and da capo arias. In 1717 the composer left Weimar, but he continued to set Franck's words years later when based at Leipzig.

Texts set by Bach include those of the cantatas BWV 31, BWV 70a, BWV 72, BWV 80, BWV 132, BWV 147, BWV 152, BWV 155, BWV 161, BWV 163, BWV 164, BWV 165, BWV 168, BWV 182, BWV 185, and BWV 186a. He also most likely wrote the text for BWV 12, BWV 172 and BWV 21.

== Works ==
- Madrigalische Seelen-Lust über das heilige Leiden unsers Erlösers (1697)
- Cycle of cantatas for the Liturgical year 1714/1715: Evangelisches Andachts-Opffer
- Cycle of cantatas for the Liturgical year 1715/1716: Evangelische Seelen-Lust
- Cycle of cantatas for the Liturgical year 1716/1717: Evangelische Sonn- und Fest-Tages-Andachten
- Heliconische Ehren-, Liebes- und Trauer-Fackeln, Weimar, Jena (1718)

== Texts set to music by Johann Sebastian Bach ==
probably by Salomon Franck (1714)

- Himmelskönig, sei willkommen, BWV 182, 25 March 1714
- Weinen, Klagen, Sorgen, Zagen, BWV 12, 22 April 1714
- Erschallet, ihr Lieder, erklinget, ihr Saiten! BWV 172, 20 May 1714
- Ich hatte viel Bekümmernis, BWV 21, 17 June 1714

From Evangelisches Andachts-Opffer (1715)

- Bereitet die Wege, bereitet die Bahn, BWV 132
- Tritt auf die Glaubensbahn, BWV 152
- Mein Gott, wie lang, ach lange? BWV 155
- Alles, was von Gott geboren, BWV 80a
- Der Himmel lacht! Die Erde jubilieret, BWV 31
- O heilges Geist- und Wasserbad, BWV 165
- Barmherziges Herze der ewigen Liebe, BWV 185
- Komm, du süße Todesstunde, BWV 161
- Ach! ich sehe, itzt, da ich zur Hochzeit gehe, BWV 162
- Nur jedem das Seine, BWV 163
- Tue Rechnung! Donnerwort, BWV 168
- Ihr, die ihr euch von Christo nennet, BWV 164
- Alles nur nach Gottes Willen, BWV 72

From Evangelische Sonn- und Fest-Tages-Andachten (1717)

- Wachet! betet! betet! wachet! BWV 70a
- Ärgre dich, o Seele, nicht, BWV 186a
- Herz und Mund und Tat und Leben, BWV 147a
