= Heike Kumlin =

German soprano

Heike Maria Kumlin is a German soprano. After studying opera in Aachen, she attended the master classes of Edith Mathis, Judith Beckmann, Peter Schreier and Christoph Prégardien. Kumlin has since performed with the Thomanerchor and the Gewandhausorchester, and is renowned for singing works by composers such as Bach, Handel and Mozart. In 2003 she recorded Bach's cantata O heilges Geist- und Wasserbad, BWV 165 conducted by Gotthold Schwarz, with Alexandra Röseler and Martin Krumbiegel.
