= Yoshikazu Mera =

Japanese countertenor (born 1971)

- 米良 美一
- Born: May 21, 1971 (age 55); Miyazaki, Japan
- Occupation: countertenor
- Years active: 1994–present
- Organizations: Bach Collegium Japan

Yoshikazu Mera (米良 美一, Mera Yoshikazu; born May 21, 1971 in Miyazaki) is a Japanese countertenor. His range is three and a half octaves.

Originally wanting to become a pop singer, Mera now primarily sings classical music from the West but also classical Japanese music. He appears frequently as a soloist with the Bach Collegium Japan, which under its conductor Masaaki Suzuki performs Baroque music. His 1998 recital disc "Nightingale" on Sweden's BIS Records was a major success in Japan.

It was revealed in a television documentary entitled "米良美一の實話" ("Yoshikazu Mera's true story") that he was born with congenital osteogenesis imperfecta.

== Selected discography ==
- Nightingale – Japanese Art Songs
- Baroque Arias
- Baroque Arias, vol. 2
- The Best of Yoshikazu Mera
- Princess Mononoke: Music from the Motion Picture (1997)
- Songs for Counter-Tenor and Orchestra
- Mera sings Bach
