= Ruth Holton =

English soprano (born 1961)

Ruth Holton (born 1961) is an English soprano singer.

== Training ==
Holton won a choral exhibition at Clare College, Cambridge and studied music there. Her later musical studies were with Elizabeth Lane, Nancy Long and Julie Kennard.

== Career ==
Like several other former members of the Clare College choir, she joined the Cambridge Singers, founded by John Rutter, a previous director of music at Clare. She has also been recorded as a member of the Tallis Scholars.

Holton is a frequent singer of baroque music and has performed or recorded with such early music specialists as John Eliot Gardiner, Ton Koopman and Gustav Leonhardt. Several critics have noted the light boyish qualities of her voice. Holton made her recording debut as a soloist in 1986 with Bach's St John Passion and between 2000 and 2001 took part in a project with Pieter Jan Leusink, the Netherlands Bach Collegium and the Holland Boys Choir to record all Bach's sacred cantatas as part of Brilliant Classics' complete Bach Edition. She participated in the project of Ton Koopman and the Amsterdam Baroque Orchestra & Choir to record Bach's complete vocal works. She has also worked with the choir of St. Thomas Church, Leipzig, where Bach was cantor, and took part in their televised performance of the Mass in B minor marking the 250th anniversary of the composer's death, as well as in an earlier broadcast of the St John Passion.

Other baroque composers she has recorded include Carissimi, Purcell and Handel. Among her work on later music are recordings of Mozart, Haydn and Schütz, a live performance of Dvořák's Stabat Mater, and performances and recordings of contemporary composers including John Adams, Steve Reich and new works by David Briggs, Howard Thomas, Matthew King, Brian Inglis and Guy Woolfenden. She has also given Lieder recitals, some of which have been broadcast by BBC Radio 3 or Westdeutscher Rundfunk. Holton has appeared at events such as the Aldeburgh Festival and the Three Choirs Festival. In addition to performing, she has coached singers internationally, as well as having been head of vocal studies at St. Joseph's College, London.
