= Makoto Sakurada =

Japanese tenor in opera and concert (born 1968)

- Born: Japan
- Occupation: Classical tenor
- Organization: Bach Collegium Japan
- Website: Biography in BCJ

Makoto Sakurada (櫻田 亮, Sakurada Makoto; born 1968) is a Japanese tenor in opera and concert.

== Biography ==
Makoto graduated from the Tokyo University of the Arts. He went to study in Italy in 1997, and continues to work there. He has recorded Bach cantatas in the complete set directed by Masaaki Suzuki, and the ongoing series directed by Rudolf Lutz.
