= Alfred Dürr =

German musicologist

- Born: 3 March 1918; Berlin-Charlottenburg, Germany
- Died: 7 April 2011 (aged 93); Göttingen, Germany
- Education: Georg-August-Universität Göttingen
- Occupation: Musicologist
- Organization: Johann Sebastian Bach Institute

Alfred Dürr (3 March 1918 – 7 April 2011) was a German musicologist. He was a principal editor of the Neue Bach-Ausgabe, the second edition of the complete works of Johann Sebastian Bach.

== Professional career ==
Dürr studied musicology and Classical philology at the Georg-August-Universität Göttingen from 1945 to 1950. He wrote his thesis about Bach's early cantatas. From 1951 until his retirement in 1983 he was an employee of the Johann Sebastian Bach Institute in Göttingen, West Germany, from 1962 to 1981 its deputy director. His work involved collaboration with colleagues in East Germany. He was a principal editor of the Neue Bach-Ausgabe, a project which was divided between the Johann Sebastian Bach Institute and the Bach-Archiv Leipzig in East Germany. From 1953 to 1974 Dürr was editor of the Bach-Jahrbuch (Bach almanach), together with Werner Neumann, the founder and director of the Bach-Archiv Leipzig.

Dürr received honorary doctorates of music from the Humboldt-Universität zu Berlin, the University of Oxford and Baldwin–Wallace College in Ohio. His 65th birthday was marked by a Festschrift Bachiana et alia musicologica (ed. W. Rehm, Kassel, 1983).

Alfred Dürr died on 7 April 2011 in Göttingen.

== Research and editing ==
Dürr wrote standard works on the Bach cantatas (1971) and on The Well-Tempered Clavier, which are of interest not only to specialists, but also to the general public. In 1957 he published in the Bach-Jahrbuch Zur Chronologie der Leipziger Vokalwerke J. S. Bachs. In his 1988 book on Bach's St John Passion, Die Johannes-Passion von Johann Sebastian Bach, he explored theological aspects as well as the four versions of the work.

=== Dating of Bach's works ===
Many of Bach's works have uncertain composition dates, and the standard catalogue, the Bach-Werke-Verzeichnis, is not a chronological one. Nevertheless, modern scholarship has been able to throw light on the chronology. Dürr's "painstaking work" changed the accepted chronology of Bach's works, especially his cantatas. The musicologist John Butt remarked:

If one had to single out the scholar who has done most to establish the new chronology of Bach's vocal works and who appears most often as an editor within the Neue Bach-Ausgabe, this would surely have to be Dürr.

== Selected publications ==
- Johann Sebastian Bach. Die Kantaten. Bärenreiter, Kassel 1999. ISBN 3-7618-1476-3
  - translation: The Cantatas of J. S. Bach
- Johann Sebastian Bach. Das Wohltemperierte Klavier. Bärenreiter, Kassel 2002. ISBN 3-7618-1229-9
- Entries for Alfred Dürr in the Library of Congress
- Entries for Alfred Dürr in WorldCat
