= Bas Ramselaar =

Dutch bass singer and conductor

Bas Ramselaar (1961 - 2025) was a Dutch bass singer and conductor.

A graduate of the Utrechts Conservatorium, he has sung with notable ensembles such as the Berliner Symphoniker, the Royal Concertgebouw Orchestra, the London Symphony Orchestra, the Nederlands Kamerorkest etc. and has performed under conductors such as Frans Brüggen, Harry Christophers, Thierry Fischer, Roy Goodman, Uwe Gronostay, Philippe Herreweghe, Robert King, Reinbert de Leeuw, Paul McCreesh, Jos van Veldhoven, among others. He is noted in particular for singing all of the bass parts in the complete Bach church cantatas cycle for Brilliant Classics, as well as Bach's St Matthew Passion and St John Passion. Ramselaar also teaches singing at Omroep Jongenskoor and has been conductor of the Amersfoorts Kantate Koor & Orkest since 2011.
