= Netherlands Bach Collegium =

The Netherlands Bach Collegium is a Baroque orchestra based in the Netherlands. It is conducted by Pieter Jan Leusink. They are noted for their Complete Cantatas Brilliant Series, a recording of the complete sacred cantatas by Johann Sebastian Bach.
