= English Baroque Soloists =

English period instrument group

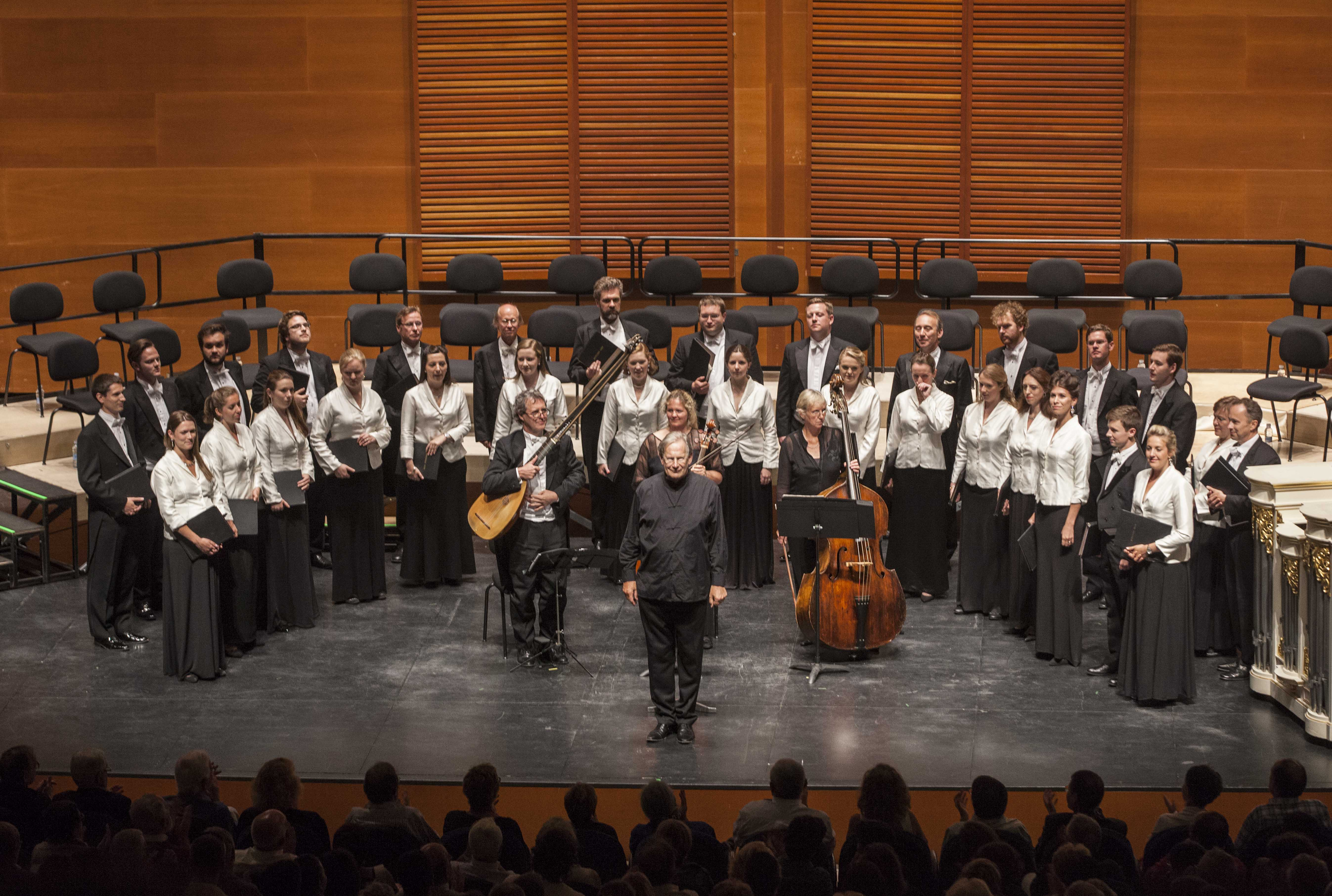
The English Baroque Soloists in 2014

The English Baroque Soloists is a chamber orchestra playing on period instruments. Formed in 1978, the English Baroque Soloists has been one of the most innovative period-instrument ensembles. Its repertoire comprises music from the early Baroque to the Classical period.

== History ==
The English Baroque Soloists developed from the Monteverdi Orchestra, which was formed by John Eliot Gardiner in 1968. The Monteverdi Orchestra played on modern instruments, and accompanied Gardiner's Monteverdi Choir. In the late 1970s the orchestra transitioned to period instruments and became the English Baroque Soloists. The first concert under the new name was in 1977 at the Innsbruck Festival of Early Music, although the orchestra was not officially formed until 1978. Alison Bury was the leader in 1983–2008.

The orchestra played at the coronation of Charles III and Camilla in Westminster Abbey in 2023.

== Relationship with other Monteverdi ensembles ==
The English Baroque Soloists often appear with the Monteverdi Choir.

In 1990 Gardiner formed the Orchestre Révolutionnaire et Romantique, another period instrument ensemble. The Orchestre Révolutionnaire et Romantique specialises in a later repertoire than that of the English Baroque Soloists, but shares some players.

== Recordings ==
English Baroque Soloists made the earliest recording of Mozart's complete piano concertos to use period instruments, with Malcolm Bilson on fortepiano, and also recorded seven of the composer's operas. The orchestra has recorded under:

- Archiv Produktion
- Erato Records
- Philips Classics Records
- Soli Deo Gloria, a label founded by John Eliot Gardiner in 2004, which originally released recordings made during the Bach Cantata Pilgrimage, but has since broadened its catalogue.

=== Discography ===
See Monteverdi Choir's discography section.
