= Pieter Jan Leusink =

Dutch conductor of classical music (born 1958)

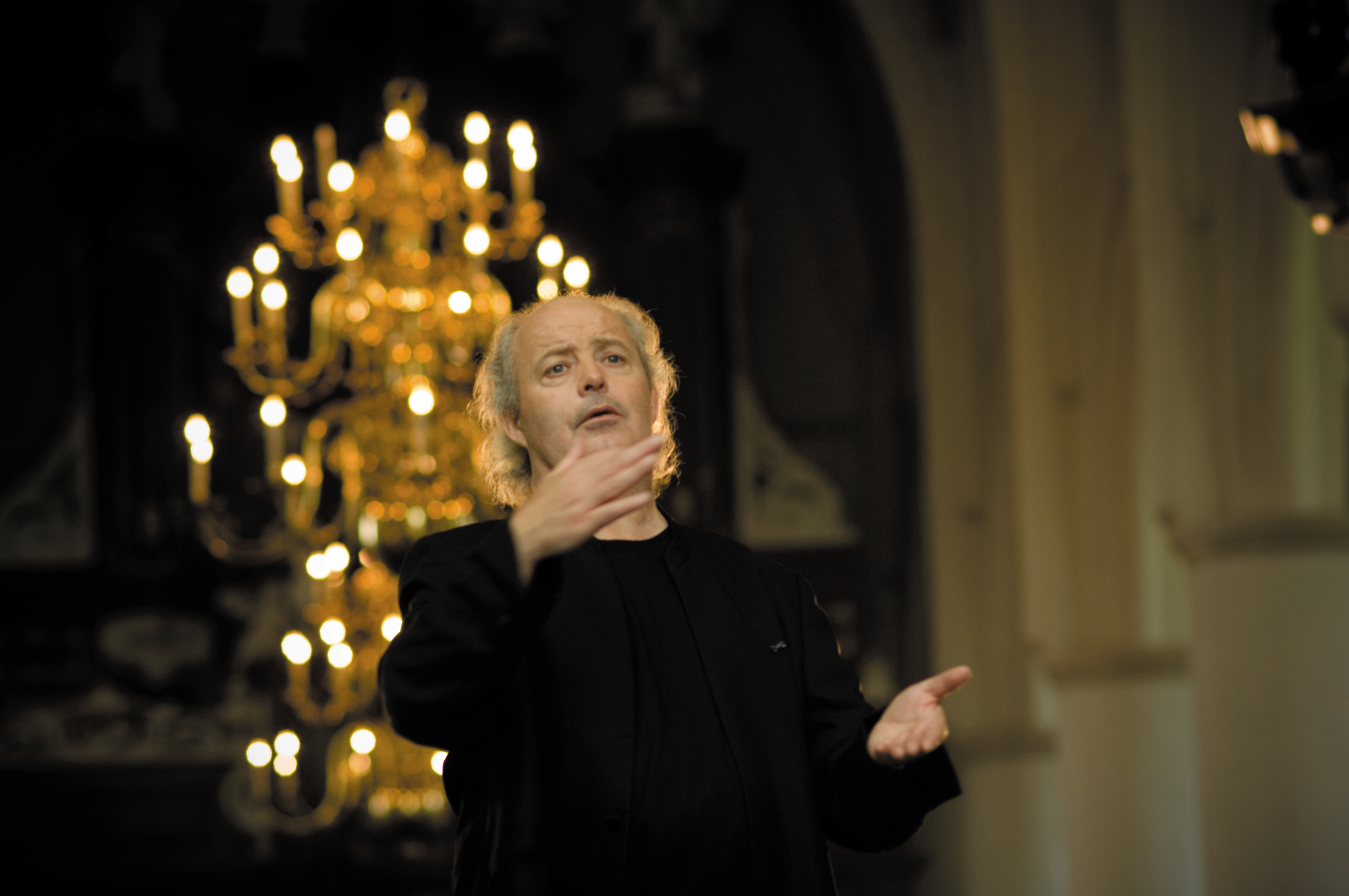
Pieter Jan Leusink

Pieter Jan Leusink (born 5 April 1958 in Elburg) is a Dutch conductor of classical music.

He studied organ in Zwolle at the Municipal Conservatory and took conducting lessons from Gottfried van der Horst. He founded the Stadsknapenkoor Elburg (Elburg City Boys' Choir) in April 1981 and founded three musical events in Elburg's St Nicholas Church, a Festival of Lessons and Carols in December, J.S. Bach's St Matthew Passion (BWV 244) during the Easter season, and summer concerts in July and August. He began conducting the Holland Boys Choir in 1984; currently it has 80 singers.

Ten years later, in 1994, he founded The Leusink Bach Orchestra and one year later, an adult mixed choir, The Bach Choir of the Netherlands. They later merged into The Bach Choir and Orchestra. He is best known for his recordings of Bach in particular, as well as Handel, Mozart, Fauré and Antonio Vivaldi and has performed in England, Wales, Denmark, Germany, Belgium, France, Italy, Poland, Latvia and his native Netherlands. Every year throughout the Netherlands about 150 concerts are performed by the choirs and the orchestra of Leusink. In 1999 and 2000 Leusink recorded all of Bach's sacred cantatas within 15 months.

In 2004, Leusink was honoured by his conferment to Knight of the Order of the Netherlands Lion.

In 2018, four female musicians accused Leusink of sexual misconduct. Two months later two more women came forward. At the time, Leusink denied the allegations; according to his counsel Peter Plasman, it was claimed they were based on differences of opinion of a business nature. After complaints from two female musicians dating back to 2012–2013 and 2013–2016, the Dutch College of Human Rights (College voor de Rechten van de Mens) ruled in June 2022 that Leusink was guilty of sexual harassment. The case Leusden is one of the elaborated cases in an analysis published by the Volkskrant about similar cases in the Dutch Cultural Sector and the resulting DARVO "deny, attack, and reverse victim & offender" strategies.
