= Bach-Collegium Stuttgart =

German instrumental ensemble

- Project orchestra
- Founded: 1965
- Location: Stuttgart
- Principal conductor: Helmuth Rilling; Hans-Christoph Rademann (from 2013)
- Website: www.bachakademie.de/de/bach-collegium.html

Bach-Collegium Stuttgart is an internationally known German instrumental ensemble, founded by Helmuth Rilling in 1965 to accompany the Gächinger Kantorei in choral music with orchestra. Its members are mostly orchestra musicians from Germany and Switzerland who get together for projects associated with the choir and also instrumental programs of their own.

The ensemble has performed at festivals such as the "Musikfest Stuttgart" of the Internationale Bachakademie Stuttgart, Salzburg Festival, Lucerne Festival, Prague Spring or Rheingau Musik Festival.

Gächinger Kantorei and Bach-Collegium Stuttgart, conducted by Rilling, completed a first recording worldwide of Bach's cantatas and oratorios, a project of 15 years in collaboration with Hänssler Classic, in 1985 on the occasion of the composer's 300th birthday. The recording was awarded a Grand Prix du Disque.

The Bach-Collegium Stuttgart has been instrumental in premieres of works such as Wolfgang Rihm's Deus Passus (Passionsstücke nach Lukas) in 2000 and new versions of works such as Mozart's Great Mass completed by Robert D. Levin.

== Interactive Hypermedia ==
- Johann Sebastian Bach Mass in B Minor (Flash)
