= Soli Deo Gloria (record label) =

British record label

Soli Deo Gloria is a British record label which releases recordings of the Monteverdi Choir and other ensembles conducted by Sir John Eliot Gardiner. It was founded in order to release recordings made during the Bach Cantata pilgrimage that took place in the year 2000. According to its website, the name Soli Deo Gloria is drawn from the initials that Johann Sebastian Bach appended at the end of each of his cantatas, dedicating them to the "glory of God alone". The label is a not-for-profit organisation.

== Bach recordings ==
=== Cantata set ===
Gardiner had a successful collaboration with Deutsche Grammophon from the 1980s, but the company was willing to release only a small number of the Bach cantatas which were recorded live in 2000. SDG set out to release a complete set of CDs of the Bach Cantata pilgrimage's concerts. In October 2005 its very first release, Bach Cantatas, volume 1 (SDG101), won "Record of the Year" at the Gramophone Awards. In 2011, by which time nearly all Bach's church cantatas had been released, SDG's Bach Cantata Pilgrimage series earned a Gramophone Award for special achievement.

=== First recording of newly discovered piece ===
In 2006, at the behest of the Bach Archive in Leipzig, SDG released the first recording of a newly discovered piece by Bach, Alles mit Gott.

== Other recordings ==
As well as music by Bach, the label has since its creation published parallel endeavours of Gardiner and his forces, such as a Pilgrimage to Santiago CD (recorded after a 2004 tour following the Camino de Santiago). In 2006 the label made headlines with a CD of two Mozart symphonies, recorded live during a concert at London's Cadogan Hall and released at the end of the evening.

Autumn 2007 saw the first recordings with the Orchestre Révolutionnaire et Romantique, recorded at the Royal Festival Hall in London and the Salle Pleyel in Paris during the Brahms and his Antecedents concert cycle. The first release in this new series was in September 2008 and included Brahms' Symphony Number 1 along with music by Mendelssohn.
