= Erschallet, ihr Lieder, erklinget, ihr Saiten! BWV 172 =

1714 church cantata by J.S. Bach

Erschallet, ihr Lieder, erklinget, ihr Saiten!
- BWV 172
- Church cantata by J. S. Bach
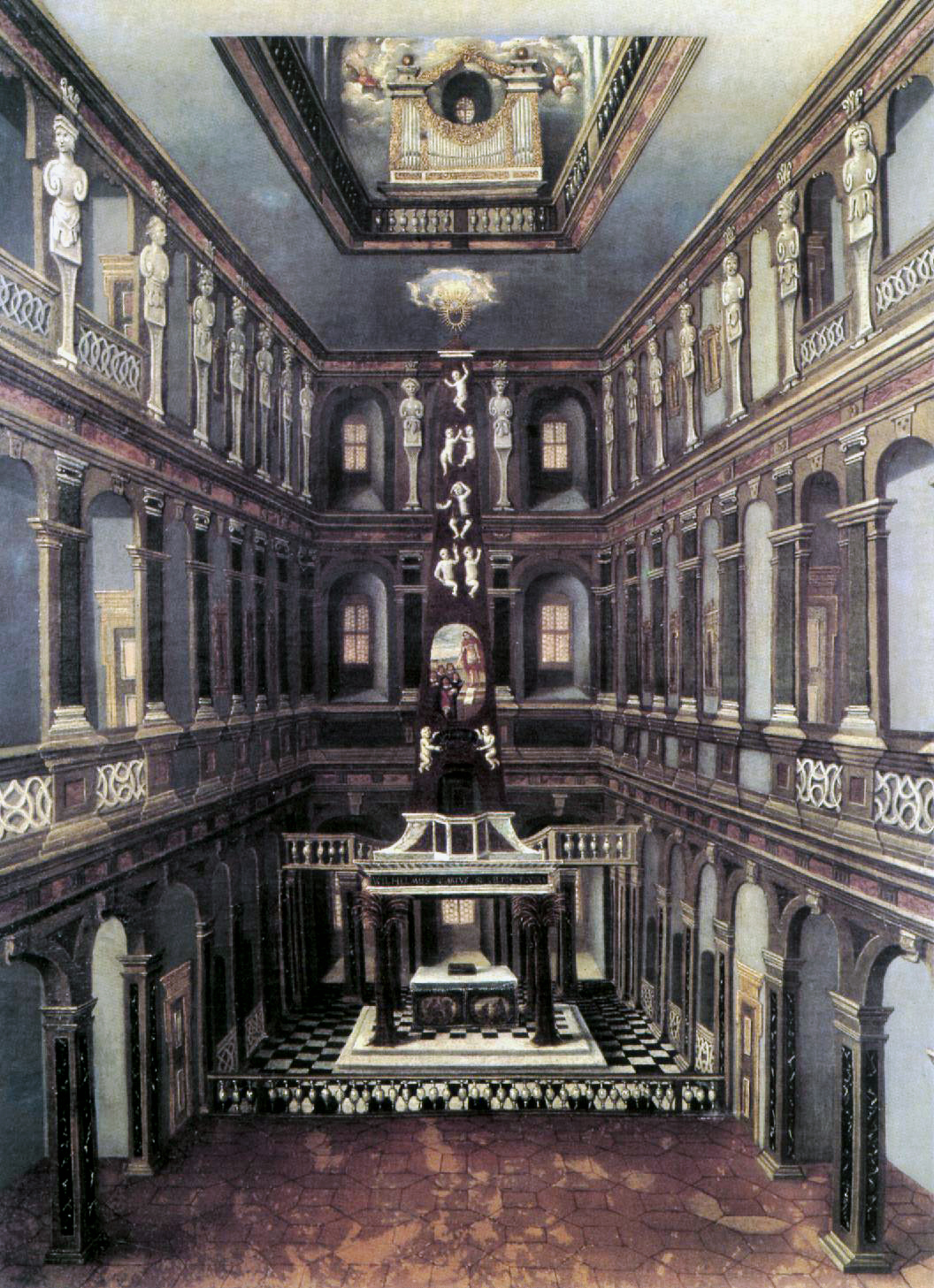
- The Schlosskirche in Weimar
- Occasion: Pentecost Sunday
- Cantata text: Salomon Franck
- Bible text: John 14:23–31
- Chorale: Komm, Heiliger Geist, Herre Gott (tune); Wie schön leuchtet der Morgenstern
- Performed: 20 May 1714: Weimar; 28 May 1724: Leipzig
- Published: 1888: by Bach-Gesellschaft; 1960: NBA
- Movements: 6
- Vocal: SATB choir and solo
- Instrumental: (Weimar): 3 trumpets; timpani; recorder; oboe d'amore; 2 violins; 2 violas; bassoon; cello; continuo

Erschallet, ihr Lieder, erklinget, ihr Saiten! (Resound, you songs; ring out, you strings!), BWV 172, (Note: "BWV" is Bach-Werke-Verzeichnis, a thematic catalogue of Bach's works.) is a church cantata by Johann Sebastian Bach, composed in Weimar for Pentecost Sunday in 1714. Bach led the first performance on 20 May 1714 in the Schlosskirche, the court chapel in the ducal Schloss. Erschallet, ihr Lieder is an early work in a genre to which he later contributed complete cantata cycles for all occasions of the liturgical year.

Bach was appointed Konzertmeister in Weimar in the spring of 1714, a position that called for the performance of a church cantata each month. He composed Erschallet, ihr Lieder as the third cantata in the series, to a text probably written by court poet Salomon Franck. The text reflects different aspects of the Holy Spirit. The librettist included a quotation from the day's prescribed Gospel reading in the only recitative, and for the closing chorale he used a stanza from Philipp Nicolai's hymn "Wie schön leuchtet der Morgenstern" (1599).

The work is in six movements, and scored for four vocal soloists, four-part choir, three trumpets, timpani, oboe, bassoon and a string orchestra of two violins, two violas, and basso continuo. The orchestra for the holiday occasion is festive compared to the two works previously composed in Weimar. The cantata opens with a chorus, followed by the recitative, in which words spoken by Jesus are sung by the bass as the vox Christi (voice of Christ). A bass aria with trumpets addresses the Trinity, and a tenor aria then describes the Spirit that was present at the Creation. This is followed by an intimate duet of the Soul (soprano) and the Spirit (alto), to which an oboe plays the ornamented melody of Martin Luther's hymn "Komm, Heiliger Geist, Herre Gott" and a solo cello provides the bass line. The theme of intimacy between God and Man is developed further in the following chorale, after which Bach specified an unusual repeat of the opening chorus.

While Bach served as Thomaskantor – director of church music – in Leipzig from 1723, he performed the cantata several times, sometimes in a different key and with changes in the scoring. Musicologists agree that he loved the cantata's Gospel text, "If ye love me ...", and the Pentecost hymn used in the duet, setting both the text and the hymn several times. John Eliot Gardiner writes that Bach "particularly valued" this cantata. It contains features that he used again in later compositions of cantatas, oratorios and his masses, for example movements with three trumpets and timpani in a triple meter for festive occasions, and duets as a symbol of God and man.

== Background ==
Bach is known as a prolific composer of cantatas. When he assumed the position as Thomaskantor (director of church music) in Leipzig in 1723, he began the project to write church cantatas for the occasions of the liturgical year – Sundays and feast days – a project that he pursued for three years.

Bach was appointed organist and chamber musician in Weimar at the court of the co-reigning dukes in Saxe-Weimar, Wilhelm Ernst and his nephew Ernst August on 25 June 1708. He had composed sacred cantatas before, some during his tenure in Mühlhausen from 1706 to 1708. Most were written for special occasions and were based mainly on biblical texts and hymns. Examples include: Aus der Tiefen rufe ich, Herr, zu dir, BWV 131; the early chorale cantata Christ lag in Todes Banden, BWV 4 for Easter; Gott ist mein König, BWV 71, to celebrate the inauguration of the new city council on 4 February 1708; and the Actus Tragicus for a funeral.

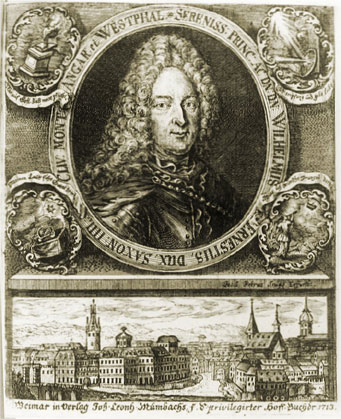
Wilhelm Ernst, Duke of Saxe-Weimar

In Weimar, Bach first concentrated on the organ, composing major works for the instrument, including the Orgelbüchlein, the Toccata and Fugue in D minor, BWV 565, and the Prelude and Fugue in E major, BWV 566. Christoph Wolff suggests that Bach may have studied musical material belonging to the Hofkapelle, ("court capelle" or court orchestra), and that he copied and studied works by Johann Philipp Krieger, Christoph Graupner, Georg Philipp Telemann, Marco Giuseppe Peranda and Johann David Heinichen in the period from 1711 to 1713. In early 1713 Bach composed his first cantatas in the new style that included recitatives and arias: the so-called Hunting Cantata, BWV 208, as a homage cantata for Christian, Duke of Saxe-Weissenfels, celebrated on 23 February, and possibly the church cantata for Sexagesima (the second Sunday before Lent) Gleichwie der Regen und Schnee vom Himmel fällt, BWV 18, on a text by Erdmann Neumeister.

In 1713, he was asked to apply for the position of music director of the Marktkirche in Halle, succeeding Friedrich Wilhelm Zachow. Zachow had taught the young George Frideric Handel, and composed many church cantatas in the new style, adopting recitatives and arias from the Italian opera. Bach was successful in his application for the position, but declined after Duke Wilhelm Ernst increased his salary and offered him a promotion.

Bach was promoted to Konzertmeister on 2 March 1714, an honour that entailed performing a church cantata monthly in the Schlosskirche: With the appointment, he received the title Konzertmeister and new privileges:

"das praedicat eines Concert-Meisters mit angezeigtem Rang nach dem Vice-Capellmeister ... dargegen Er Monatlich neüe Stücke ufführen, und zu solchen Proben die Capell Musici uf sein Verlangen zu erscheinen schuldig ... gehalten seyn sollen" (the title of a concert master, next in rank to the vice chapel master ... for which he is to perform new pieces each month, and the chapel musicians shall be under a duty to attend such rehearsals as he may require).

Circumstances were favourable: Bach enjoyed a "congenial and intimate" space in the court chapel, called Himmelsburg (Heaven's Castle), and a professional group of musicians in the court capelle. He was inspired by a collaboration with the court poet Salomon Franck, who provided the texts for most of his church cantatas, capturing a "pure, straightforward theological message" in "elegant poetic language". The first two cantatas Bach composed in Weimar based on Franck's texts were Himmelskönig, sei willkommen, BWV 182, for Palm Sunday, which coincided with the Annunciation that year, and Weinen, Klagen, Sorgen, Zagen, BWV 12 for Jubilate Sunday. One month after Erschallet, ihr Lieder, Bach performed Ich hatte viel Bekümmernis, BWV 21, on the third Sunday after Trinity, again on a text by Franck. Erschallet, ihr Lieder, the third cantata in this series, is the first cantata for a feast day.

== Occasion and words ==
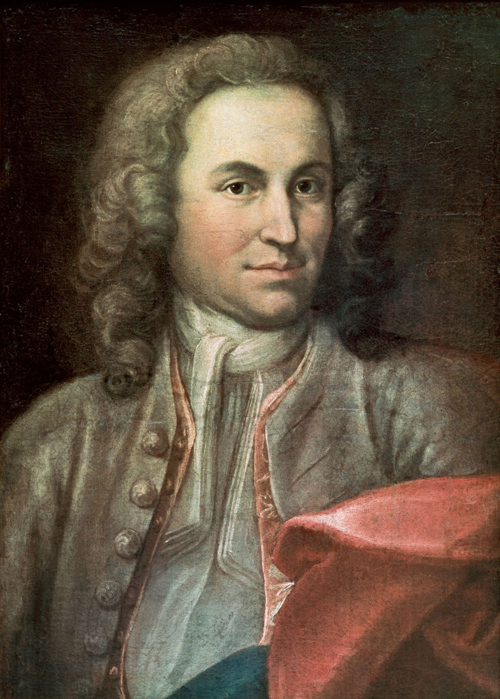
Portrait of the young Bach (disputed)

Erschallet, ihr Lieder is the third of the Weimar cantatas. It was the first composed for a feast day, Pentecost Sunday (Whit Sunday), Pentecost being a high holiday along with Christmas and Easter. The prescribed readings for the feast day are taken from the Acts of the Apostles, on the Holy Spirit (Acts 2:1–13), and from the Gospel of John, in which Jesus announces the Spirit who will teach, in his Farewell Discourse (John 14:23–31). As in many Bach cantatas, the libretto is compiled from Bible text, contemporary poetry and chorale. The poetry is attributed to Salomon Franck, although the verses are not included in his printed editions. Several of Bach's early stylistic mannerisms appear here, such as a biblical quotation in a recitative second movement rather than in a first choral movement, arias following each other without a recitative in between, and dialogue in a duet.

Franck's text shows elements of early Pietism: the expression of extreme feelings, for example "O seligste Zeiten!" (O most blessed times) in the opening chorus, and a "mystical demeanour", for example in the duet of the Soul and the Spirit united. In the middle section of the first movement, Franck paraphrases the Gospel text, which says in verse 23 that God wants to dwell with man, to "Gott will sich die Seelen zu Tempeln bereiten" (God Himself shall prepare our souls for His temple, more literally: "God wants to prepare [our] souls to become his temples"). The words for the recitative are the quotation of verse 23 from the Gospel of John, "Wer mich liebet, der wird mein Wort halten" (Whoever loves Me will keep My Word, and My Father will love him, and We will come to him and make Our dwelling with him). Movement 3 addresses the Trinity and movement 4 the Spirit that was present at the Creation. Movement 5 is a duet of the Soul and the Spirit, underlined by an instrumental quote from Martin Luther's Pentecost hymn "Komm, Heiliger Geist, Herre Gott", which is based on the Latin hymn "Veni Sancte Spiritus, reple tuorum corda fidelium". Movement 6 is a chorale, verse four of Philipp Nicolai's hymn "Wie schön leuchtet der Morgenstern". Nicolai's "Geistlich Brautlied" (Spiritual bridal song) continues the theme of unity between Soul and Spirit.

== Performances and theme ==
With Bach's appointment to concert master and his regular monthly cantata compositions, he achieved permission to hold rehearsals in the church, to ensure high performance standards: "the rehearsing of the pieces at the home [of the capellmeister] has been changed, and it is ordered that it must always take place at the Kirchen-Capelle [the music gallery in the palace church], and this is also to be observed by the Capellmeister". The orchestra at his disposition consisted of the members of the court cappelle, three leaders, five singers and seven instrumentalists, augmented on demand by military musicians, town musicians and choristers from a gymnasium.

Bach conducted the first performance of Erschallet, ihr Lieder on 20 May 1714. His son Carl Philipp Emanuel Bach remembered that he often conducted and played first violin: "he played the violin cleanly and penetratingly, and thus kept the orchestra in better order than he could have done with the harpsichord". The parts for the first performance are lost, but the score and performing material for later performances have survived. Bach performed the cantata again, possibly in Köthen between 1717 and 1722, and several times as Thomaskantor in Leipzig. For the performance on 28 May 1724, he changed the instrumentation slightly and transposed the work from C major to D major. He reverted to C major for a performance on 13 May 1731. An organ part for a later performance of movement 5 is extant.

John Eliot Gardiner remarked that Bach "particularly valued" this cantata, and that it set "a pattern for his later approaches to the Pentecostal theme". Bach set the Gospel text of the recitative in a choral movement in other cantatas for Pentecost – Wer mich liebet, der wird mein Wort halten, BWV 59, and Wer mich liebet, der wird mein Wort halten, BWV 74.

== Music ==
=== Scoring and structure ===
In the Weimar version, Bach scored the cantata four vocal soloists (soprano (S), alto (A), tenor (T) and bass (B)), a four-part choir, and an orchestra of three trumpets (Tr), timpani (Ti), recorder (Fl) or flauto traverso (Ft), oboe d'amore (Oa), two violins (Vl), two violas (Va), bassoon (Fg), cello (Vc), and basso continuo (Bc). It is a festive, rich instrumentation for the holiday, whereas the previous two cantatas in Weimar had not employed brass instruments. Bach used the French string orchestra with two viola parts, as in most cantatas until 1715, when he started to prefer the Italian scoring with one viola. In Weimar, a recorder or flauto traverso doubled the first violin an octave higher; in the first Leipzig performance it was a flauto traverso. A part for obbligato organ (Org) replacing oboe and cello in movement 5 was adopted in an even later performance. The work is about 25 minutes long. In the Weimar version and the 1724 version, Bach requested a repeat of the opening chorus, by adding after the chorale Chorus repetatur ab initio.

In the following table of the movements, the scoring follows the Weimar version of the Neue Bach-Ausgabe, and the abbreviations for voices and instruments the list of Bach cantatas. The keys are given for the Weimar version. The time signature is provided using the symbol for common time (4/4).

Movements of Erschallet, ihr Lieder, BWV 172
No.	Title	Text	Type	Vocal	Winds	Strings	Bass	Key	Time
1	Erschallet, ihr Lieder	Franck	Chorus	SATB	3Tr Ti Fg	2Vl 2Va	Bc	C major	3/8
2	Wer mich liebet, der wird mein Wort halten	Bible	Recitative	B			Bc	A minor – C major	common time
3	Heiligste Dreieinigkeit	Franck	Aria	B	3Tr Fg		Bc	C major	common time
4	O Seelenparadies	Franck	Aria	T		2Vl 2Va	Bc	A minor	3/4
5	Komm, laß mich nicht länger warten	Franck	Aria	S A	Oa	Vc		F major	common time
6	Von Gott kömmt mir ein Freudenschein	Nicolai	Chorale	SATB	Fg	2Vl 2Va	Bc	F major	common time
7	"Chorus repetatur ab initio" (Repeat opening chorus)	Franck	Chorus	SATB	3Tr Ti Fg	2Vl 2Va	Bc	C major	3/8

=== Movements ===
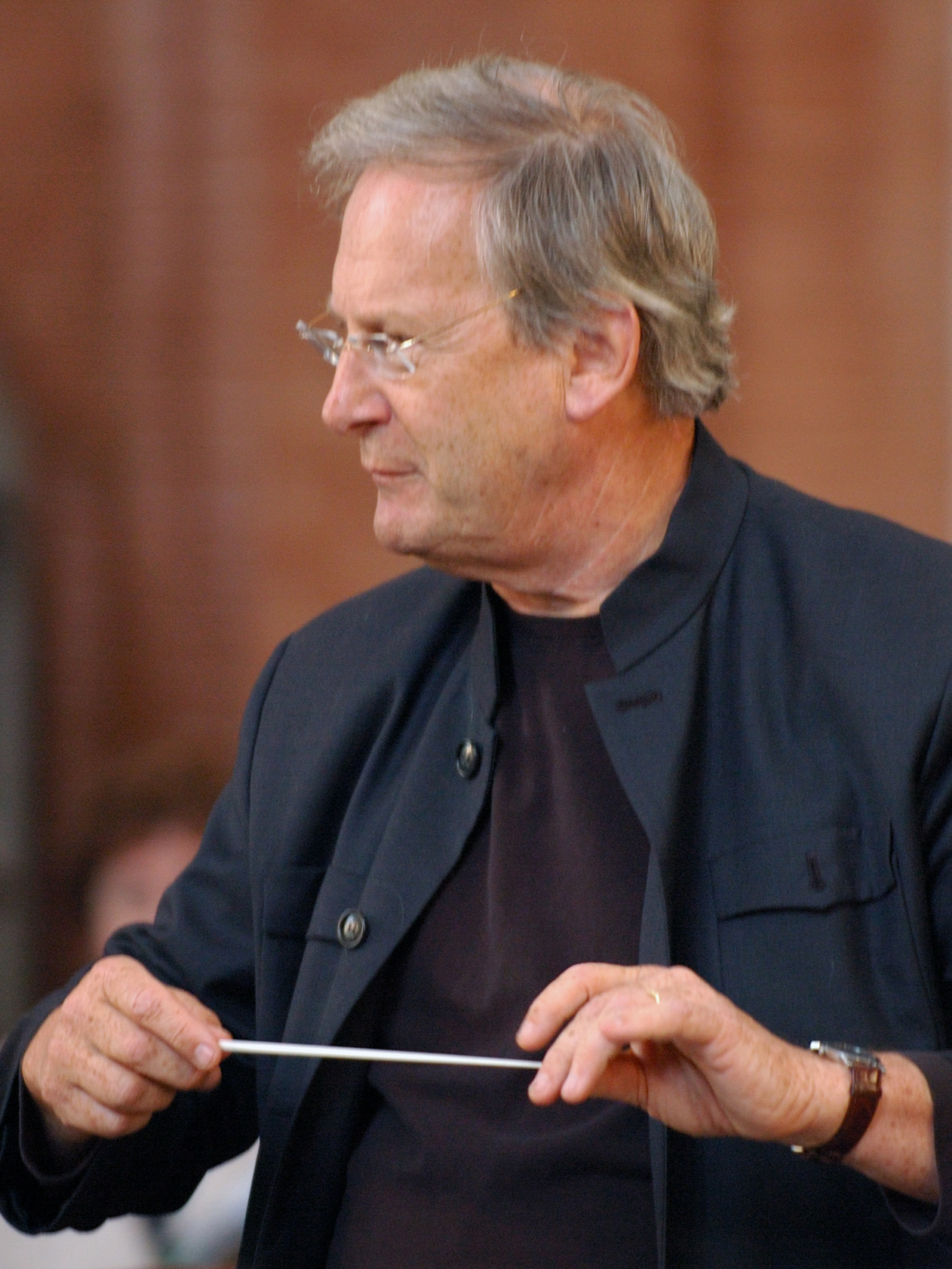
John Eliot Gardiner, who conducted the Bach Cantata Pilgrimage, in 2007

The cantata text does not tell a story but reflects different aspects of the Holy Spirit, celebrated on Pentecost. It begins with general praise, then concentrates on one line from the Gospel, addresses the Holy Trinity, refers to the Spirit that was present at the Creation, shows a dialogue between the Soul and the Spirit, and concludes with a stanza from Nicolai's hymn which picks up the topic of unity between God (Spirit) and man, as shown in the dialogue. The text thus proceeds from general to more and more personal and intimate reflection.

John Eliot Gardiner, who conducted all Bach's church cantatas in 2000, placed the Pentecostal cantatas in the middle of the project, which he saw as a "year-long exploration of his cantatas in their seasonal context". He described Pentecost as "the culmination of those 'great fifty days' which follow the Resurrection, a watershed marking the completion of Jesus' work on earth and the coming of the Holy Spirit", and commented that Bach "comes up with music of unalloyed optimism and exuberance in celebration of ... the miraculous ignition of the divine Pentecostal spark which allows human beings to communicate across the language barrier". Regarding Erschallet, ihr Lieder, the first cantata written for the occasion, he observed that Bach reflects the "stages in the evolving relationship of God with man", both by scoring and by his choice of keys. In the Weimar first version, the key of the first movements is C major, lowered to A minor (a third lower) in the fourth, lowered further to F major (again a third lower) in the fifth and sixth. The scoring is majestic, with three trumpets and timpani in movement 1 and three trumpets again in movement 3, reduced to strings in movement 4 and to single instruments in movement 5.

==== 1 ====
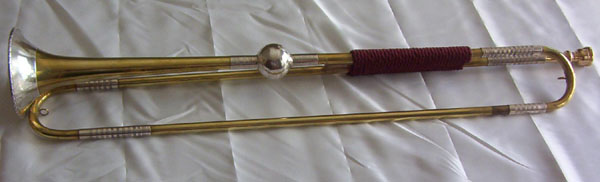
Natural trumpet, copy by Francisco Pérez after a model Johann Leonhard Ehe III, c. 1700

"Erschallet, ihr Lieder" (literally: sound, you songs) is a festive concerto, marked Coro by Bach. Words and music are possibly based on an earlier lost secular Glückwunschkantate (congratulatory cantata). A printing of Franck's works contains a cantata for New Year's Day, Erschallet nun wieder, glückwünschende Lieder (Sound again, congratulating songs) that may have served as a model. The movement is in da capo form: the first section is repeated after a contrasting middle section. It is scored for three "choirs": one of trumpets, another of strings and bassoon, and a four-part chorus. The number three, symbolizing the Trinity, appears again in the 3/8 time signature and in the use of three trumpets. The first part opens with trumpet fanfares, alternating with flowing coloraturas in the strings. The voices enter as a third homophonic choir. They repeat the first measure of the fanfare motif on the word "Erschallet" (resound!), as the trumpets echo the motif. The voices repeat the motif from the second measure of the fanfare on "ihr Lieder", and the trumpets echo it again. The chorus repeats measures 3 and 4 on "erklinget, ihr Saiten", commanding the strings to play. As a culmination, the first syllable of "seligste Zeiten" (most blessed times) is held on a seventh chord (first in measure 53), during which the instruments play their motifs.

In the middle section in A minor the trumpets rest while the other instruments play colla parte with the voices. Polyphonic imitation expands on the idea that God will prepare the souls to be his temples. The first sequence progresses from the lowest to the highest voice, with entrances after two or three measures. The highest voice begins the second sequence, and the other voices enter in closer succession, one or two measures apart. Gardiner interprets the polyphony as "conjuring before us the elegant tracery of those 'temples' which God promises to make of our souls". The first part is repeated as da capo.

The movement is comparable to the opening of Tönet, ihr Pauken! Erschallet, Trompeten! BWV 214 (Resound, ye drums! Ring out, ye trumpets!) composed in 1733 on another text calling instruments to sound, which Bach later used with a different text to open his Christmas Oratorio. Bach used a festive scoring with three trumpets in triple meter in his 1733 Missa for the court in Dresden, in the Gloria, in contrast to the preceding Kyrie.

==== 2 ====
The cantata's only recitative quotes one line from the Gospel reading of the day: "Wer mich liebet, der wird mein Wort halten" (Whoever loves Me will keep My Word[, and My Father will love him, and We will come to him and make Our dwelling with him]). Bach reflects Jesus' promise to "make Our dwelling with him" in melismatic lines in counterpoint with motifs in the cello similar to motifs in movement 5. He assigned the words of Jesus to the bass as the vox Christi (voice of Christ). He illustrates the final rest in God by ending the solo line on a whole note low C, the lowest note he demanded of a soloist. The musicologist Julian Mincham describes the vocal line:

The initial bars of melody are warm and quietly authoritative, but at the mention of dwelling with Him the movement takes on a very different character. The bass line becomes enlivened with little leaps of delight ... The singer's last note is a bottom d (c in the transposed version) several notes lower than a bass's accepted range. ... when achieved it is an arresting sound, confirming the rock-like certainty of the promise that we shall eventually reside with God.

==== 3 ====
The first aria, addressing the Trinity, "Heiligste Dreieinigkeit" (Holiest Trinity), is accompanied by a choir of three trumpets and basso continuo, a rare combination that expresses the idea of the words. The trumpet is a symbol of a ruler. The three trumpets sometimes play in unison, to further illustrate the Trinity. The theme is composed of the three notes of the major chord. The aria is in three sections.

Bach wrote an aria accompanied by only an obbligato brass instrument again in his Missa of 1733 in B minor, composed for the court in Dresden and much later integrated into his Mass in B minor. The bass aria Quoniam tu solus sanctus, reflecting God's holiness and majesty, is set for corno da caccia, two bassoons and basso continuo. When he assembled the complete mass, he used an aria with only woodwinds to reflect the Holy Spirit in Et in Spiritum Sanctum, also a movement with many symbols of the Trinity.

==== 4 ====
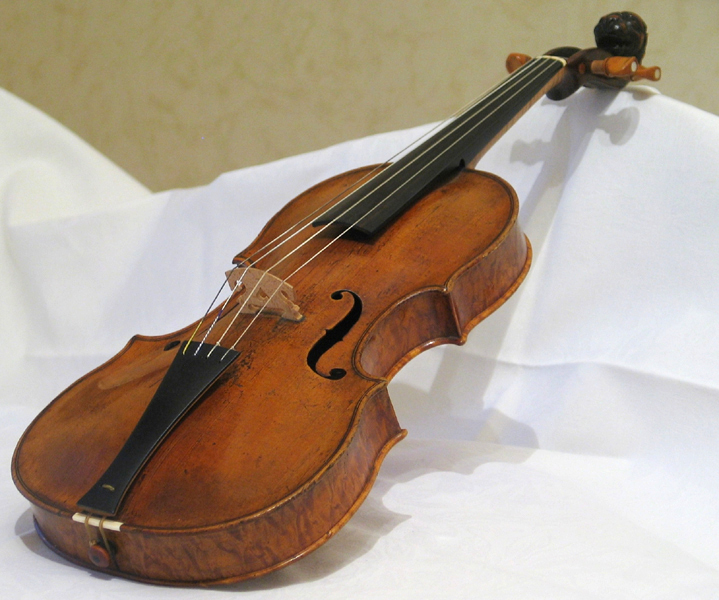
Baroque violin by Jacob Stainer, 1658

The second aria, for tenor, "O Seelenparadies" (O paradise of the soul), also contains three sections and a triple meter, but in contrast to the previous movement, describes in continuous waves of the unison strings the Spirit that was present at the Creation, worded O Seelenparadies, das Gottes Geist durchwehet, der bei der Schöpfung blies (O paradise of the soul, fanned by the Spirit of God, which blew at creation). Alfred Dürr wrote that the music "conveys the impression of release from all earthly gravity".

==== 5 ====
The last solo movement, a duet aria, "Komm, laß mich nicht länger warten" (Come, do not keep me waiting longer), consists of a dialogue between the Soul and the Holy Spirit, and takes a form close to a love lyric. The part of the Spirit is assigned to the alto, while similar duets of the Soul and Jesus in later cantatas are set for soprano and bass – for example in Ich hatte viel Bekümmernis, BWV 21 and Wachet auf, ruft uns die Stimme, BWV 140.

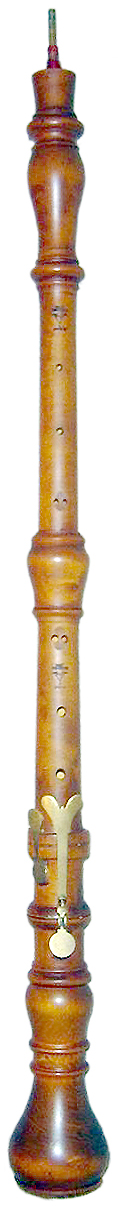
Baroque oboe d'amore

Bach set the text in a complex structure uniting two singers, a solo oboe and a solo cello. The soprano and alto sing of their unity in "neo-erotic" or "overtly erotic/Pietistic" language: "I shall die, if I have to be without you" the one; "I am yours, and you are mine!" the other. The cello provides an intricate counterpoint throughout, which Albert Schweitzer describes as "a motif of purified happiness". The voices and the cello form a trio, another symbol of the Trinity. The musicologist Anne Leahy of the Dublin Institute of Technology notes that Bach had possibly stanza 3 in mind, which speaks of love, and used the instrument which is named after love.

The oboe d'amore plays the richly ornamented melody of the Pentecost hymn "Komm, Heiliger Geist, Herre Gott" ("Come, Holy Spirit, Lord God, fill with the goodness of Your grace the hearts, wills, and minds of Your faithful. Ignite Your burning love in them".) Bach set this hymn, which seems close to his heart, twice in his Great Eighteen Chorale Preludes, as BWV 651 and BWV 652.

Bach used duets again when he composed in 1733 his Missa (Kyrie and Gloria) in B minor for the court in Dresden, which he later integrated into his Mass in B minor. He wrote two duets movements in the style of contemporary operatic love duets and placed two of them in the centre of each part of the Missa: Christe eleison for two sopranos in the centre of the Kyrie, Domine Deus in the centre of the symmetrical structure of the Gloria. When he compiled the Mass in B minor, he chose another duet Et in unum Dominum Jesum Christum for the Credo, scored for soprano and alto, as in Erschallet, ihr Lieder.

==== 6 ====
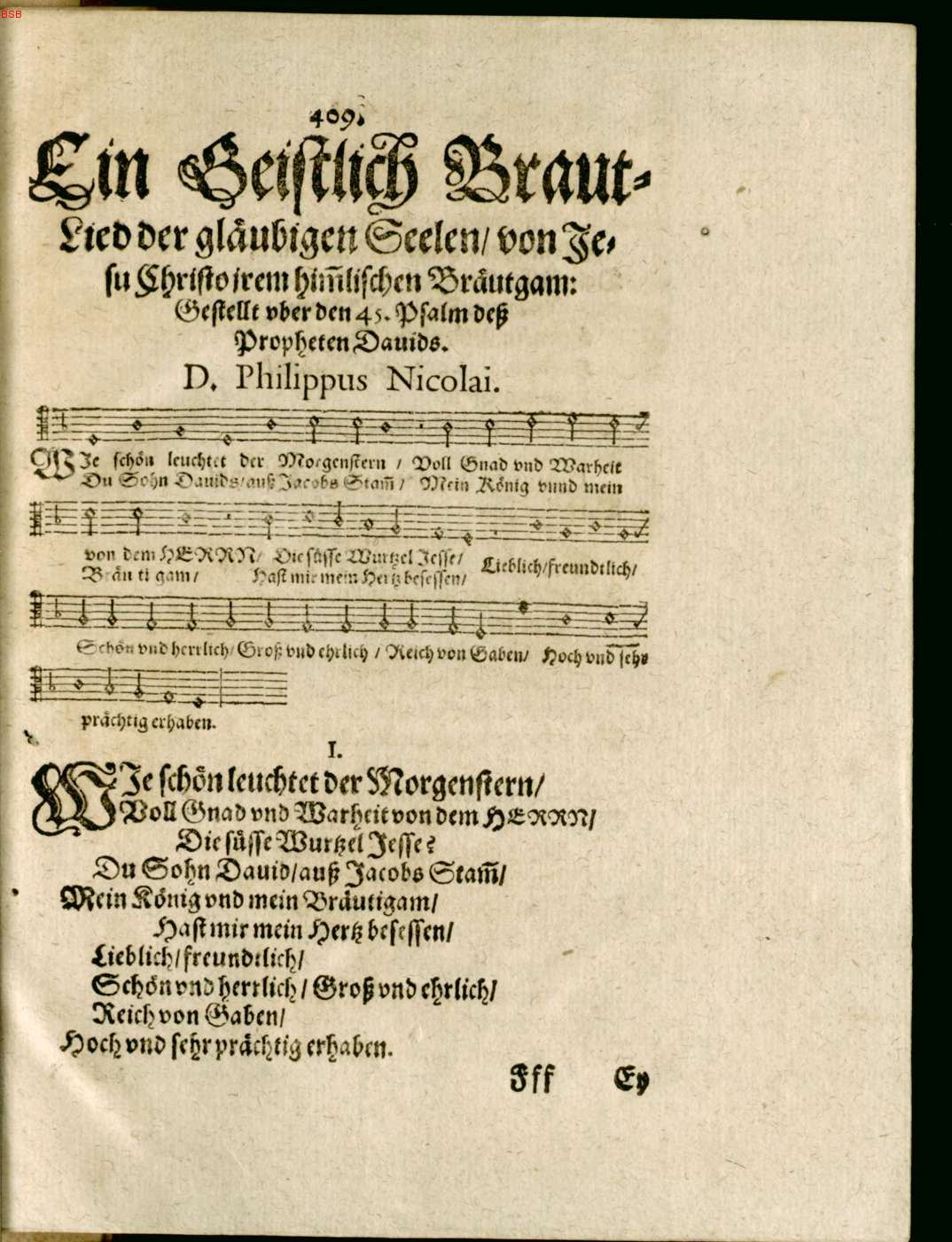
"Wie schön leuchtet der Morgenstern", first publication of the hymn by Philipp Nicolai, 1599

The text of the concluding chorale is taken from Nicolai's "Geistlich Brautlied" (Spiritual bridal song) "Wie schön leuchtet der Morgenstern", continuing the theme of unity between Soul and Spirit. "Von Gott kömmt mir ein Freudenschein" (A joyful radiance reaches me from God) is illustrated by a violin part added to the four-part choir. The text ends with the words:

Nimm mich freundlich
In dein' Arme, daß ich warme
Werd' von Gnaden!
Auf dein Wort komm' ich geladen.

(Take me like a friend / in your arms, so that I may become warm / with your grace / To your word I come invited.)

Until 1724 the opening chorus was repeated after the chorale, marked "chorus repetatur ab initio" in the manuscript.

Gardiner describes the cantata as "evidently ... a work which he particularly valued", adding: "he comes up with music of unalloyed optimism and exuberance in celebration of the first gifts of newly-awakened nature, as well as the miraculous ignition of the divine Pentecostal spark which allows human beings to communicate across the language barrier." Dürr comments:

All the various changes he made show how much trouble Bach took over a work which – as the number of documented performances (at least four) suggests – he seems to have particularly loved.

== Publication ==
The cantata was published by Breitkopf & Härtel in 1888 in volume 35 of the first complete edition of Bach's works by the Bach Gesellschaft, edited by Alfred Dörffel. In the Neue Bach-Ausgabe, the second complete edition of Bach's works, in the historical-critical edition, Dietrich Kilian edited both the reconstructed Weimar version (1959) and the first Leipzig version (1960) in volume 13, adding the critical report in 1960.

== Recordings ==
The entries are taken from the listing on the Bach Cantatas Website. Ensembles playing period instruments in historically informed practise are marked green.

Recordings of Erschallet, ihr Lieder, erklinget, ihr Saiten!, BWV 172
Title	Conductor / Choir / Orchestra	Soloists	Label	Year	Orch. type
J.S. Bach: Cantatas BWV 68 & BWV 172	Klaus Martin Ziegler Vokalensemble Kassel Deutsche Bachsolisten	Ursula Buckel; Irma Keller; Theo Altmeyer; Jakob Stämpfli	Cantate / Nonesuch	1966	
Cantatas BWV 172 & BWV 78	Erhard Mauersberger Thomanerchor Gewandhausorchester	Adele Stolte; Annelies Burmeister; Peter Schreier; Theo Adam	Eterna	1970	
Cantatas. Selections (BWV 172–175)	Helmuth Rilling Frankfurter Kantorei Bach-Collegium Stuttgart	Eva Csapò; Doris Soffel; Adalbert Kraus; Wolfgang Schöne	Hänssler	1975	
Cantatas BWV 172 & BWV 78	Hans-Joachim Rotzsch Thomanerchor Gewandhausorchester	Arleen Augér; Ortrun Wenkel; Peter Schreier; Theo Adam	Berlin Classics	1981	
J. S. Bach: Das Kantatenwerk – Sacred Cantatas Vol. 9	Gustav Leonhardt: Knabenchor Hannover; Collegium Vocale Gent; Leonhardt-Consort	Matthias Echternach (soloist of the Knabenchor Hannover); Paul Esswood; Marius van Altena; Max van Egmond	Teldec	1987	Period
J. Bach: Complete Cantatas Vol. 2	Ton Koopman Amsterdam Baroque Orchestra & Choir	Barbara Schlick; Kai Wessel; Christoph Prégardien; Klaus Mertens	Antoine Marchand	1995	Period
Cantatas Vol. 7	Masaaki Suzuki Bach Collegium Japan	Ingrid Schmithüsen; Yoshikazu Mera; Makoto Sakurada; Peter Kooy	BIS	1998	Period
Bach Edition Vol. 8 – Cantatas Vol. 3	Pieter Jan Leusink Holland Boys Choir Netherlands Bach Collegium	Ruth Holton; Sytse Buwalda; Nico van der Meel; Bas Ramselaar	Brilliant Classics	1999	Period
Bach Cantatas Vol. 26	John Eliot Gardiner Monteverdi Choir English Baroque Soloists	Lisa Larsson; Derek Lee Ragin; Christoph Genz; Panajotis Iconomou	Soli Deo Gloria	2000	Period

== Cited sources ==
Scores

- Erschallet, ihr Lieder, BWV 172: Scores at the International Music Score Library Project
- "Erschallet, ihr Lieder [Weimar version] BWV 172.1; BWV 172; BC A 81a". Bach Digital. 1960.
- "Erschallet, ihr Lieder [2nd version] BWV 172.2; BWV 172; BC A 81b". Bach Digital. 1960.
- "Cantata BWV 172 – Erschallet, ihr Lieder (Johann Sebastian Bach)". CPDL Free Choral Sheet Music. Archived from the original on 19 May 2009.
- No. 171–180. Universitätsbibliothek Heidelberg. 1888.
- Kilian, Dietrich (1965). Bach Erschallet, ihr Lieder, Vocal Score based on the Urtext of the New Bach Edition. Bärenreiter.

Books

- Arnold, Jochen (2009). Von Gott poetisch-musikalisch reden: Gottes verborgenes und offenbares Handeln in Bachs Kantaten (in German). Vandenhoeck & Ruprecht. ISBN 978-3-647-57124-9.
- Buelow, George J. (2004). A History of Baroque Music. Indiana University Press. ISBN 0-253-34365-8.
- Dürr, Alfred (1951). Studien über die frühen Kantaten Johann Sebastian Bachs: Fassung der im Jahr 1951 erschienenen Dissertation (in German). Breitkopf und Härtel. ISBN 3-7651-0130-3.
- Dürr, Alfred (1971). Die Kantaten von Johann Sebastian Bach (in German). Vol. 1 (4 ed.). Deutscher Taschenbuchverlag. ISBN 3-423-04080-7.
- Dürr, Alfred; Jones, Richard D. P. (2006). "Erschallet, ihr Lieder, BWV 172". The Cantatas of J. S. Bach: With Their Librettos in German-English Parallel Text. Oxford University Press. ISBN 978-0-19-929776-4.
- Leahy, Anne (2011). J. S. Bach's 'Leipzig' Chorale Preludes: Music, Text, Theology. Scarecrow Press. ISBN 978-0-8108-8182-2.
- Wolff, Christoph (2002). Johann Sebastian Bach: The Learned Musician. Oxford University Press. ISBN 978-0-393-32256-9.
- Wolff, Christoph (1991). "Decisive Career Steps". Bach: Essays on his Life and Music. Harvard University Press. ISBN 978-0-674-05926-9.
- Zedler, Günther (2008). Die erhaltenen Kirchenkantaten Johann Sebastian Bachs (Mühlhausen, Weimar, Leipzig I): Besprechungen in Form von Analysen – Erklärungen – Deutungen (in German). BoD – Books on Demand. ISBN 3-8370-4401-7.

Online sources

The complete recordings of Bach's cantatas are accompanied by liner notes from musicians and musicologists; John Eliot Gardiner commented on his Bach Cantata Pilgrimage, Tadashi Isoyama wrote for Masaaki Suzuki, and Christoph Wolff for Ton Koopman.

- Amati-Camperi, Alexandra (2005). "Notes: Bach B Minor Mass". San Francisco Bach Choir. Archived from the original on 4 October 2013.
- Bach, Peter (2012). "Erschallet, ihr Lieder, erklinget, ihr Saiten!" (in German). bach.de.
- Baxter, Geffrey (2013). "Bach's Creed / Two Views of the Symbolum Nicenum of the Mass in B-Minor" (PDF). ASO Chamber Chorus. Archived from the original (PDF) on 3 March 2016.
- Braatz, Thomas; Oron, Aryeh (2006). "Chorale Melodies used in Bach's Vocal Works / Komm, Heiliger Geist, Herre Gott". Bach Cantatas Website.
- Browne, Francis (2005). "Wie schön leuchtet der Morgenstern / Text and Translation of Chorale". Bach Cantatas Website.
- Dellal, Pamela (2012). "BWV 172 – "Erschallet, ihr Lieder, erklinget, ihr Saiten!"". Emmanuel Music.
- Gardiner, John Eliot (2006). Johann Sebastian Bach (1685-1750) / Cantatas Nos 34, 59, 68, 74, 172, 173 & 174 (Media notes). Soli Deo Gloria (at Hyperion Records website).
- Isoyama, Tadashi (1998). "BWV 172: Erschallet, ihr Lieder, erklinget, ihr Saiten! / (Ring out, songs, resound, strings!)" (PDF). Bach Cantatas Website.
- Koster, Jan (2011). "Weimar 1708–1717". let.rug.nl. Archived from the original on 28 March 2014.
- Lowen, Marla (1999). "BWV 172 Erschallet, ihr Lieder, erklinget, ihr Saiten!" (PDF). Oregon Bach Festival Discovery Series. Archived from the original (PDF) on 2 March 2014.
- Magdolna, Friedler (2008). "Johann Sebastian Bach Orgelbüchlein-gyűjteményének nyomában" (PDF) (in Hungarian). Magyar Bach Társaság.
- Mincham, Julian (2010). "Chapter 57 BWV 172 Erschallet, ihr Lieder, erklinget, ihr Saiten! / Resound songs, and ring out strings!". jsbachcantatas.com.
- Oron, Aryeh (2012). "Cantata BWV 172 Erschallet, ihr Lieder, erklinget, ihr Saiten!". Bach Cantatas Website.
- Quinn, John (2007). "Johann Sebastian Bach – Legendary Recordings". musicweb-international.com.
- Rathey, Markus (2003). "Johann Sebastian Bach's Mass in B Minor: The Greatest Artwork of All Times and All People" (PDF). bach.nau.edu. Archived from the original (PDF) on 5 October 2013.
- Robins, Brian (2013). "Cantata No. 172, "Erschallet, ihr Lieder," BWV 172". Allmusic.
- Towe, Teri Noel (2014). "The Portrait in Erfurt Alleged to Depict Bach, the Weimar Concertmeister". The Face Of Bach. Archived from the original on 16 July 2011.
