= Also hat Gott die Welt geliebt, BWV 68 =

Church cantata by Johann Sebastian Bach

Also hat Gott die Welt geliebt
- BWV 68
- Church cantata by J. S. Bach
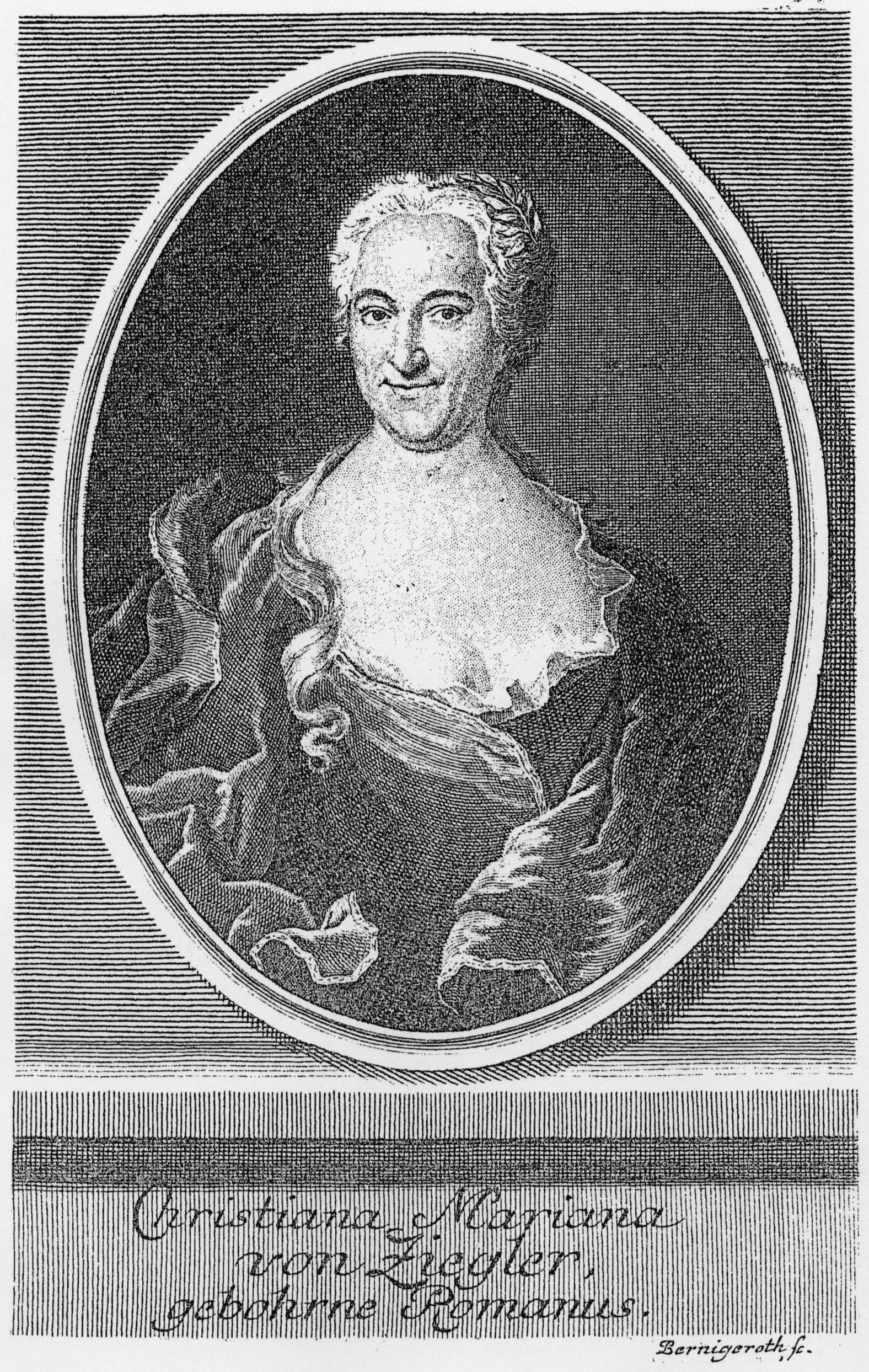
- Christiana Mariana von Ziegler, author of the cantata text
- Occasion: Pentecost Monday
- Cantata text: Christiana Mariana von Ziegler
- Bible text: John 3:18
- Chorale: by Salomo Liscow
- Performed: 21 May 1725: Leipzig
- Movements: 5
- Vocal: SATB choir; solo: soprano and bass
- Instrumental: horn; cornetto; 3 trombones; 2 oboes; taille; 2 violins; viola; violoncello piccolo; continuo

Also hat Gott die Welt geliebt (God so loved the world), BWV 68, is a cantata by Johann Sebastian Bach, a church cantata for the second day of Pentecost. Bach composed the cantata in Leipzig and first performed it on 21 May 1725. It is one of nine cantatas on texts by Christiana Mariana von Ziegler, which Bach composed at the end of his second annual cycle of cantatas in Leipzig. In a unique structure among Bach's church cantatas, it begins with a chorale and ends with a complex choral movement on a quotation from the Gospel of John. Bach derived the two arias from his Hunting Cantata. He scored the cantata for two soloists, soprano and bass, a four-part choir, and a Baroque instrumental ensemble of a horn, cornett, three trombones, two oboes, taille (tenor oboe), strings and basso continuo.

== History and words ==
Bach composed the cantata during his second year in Leipzig for Pentecost Monday. The prescribed readings for the feast day were taken from the Acts of the Apostles, the sermon of Saint Peter for Cornelius (Acts 10:42–48), and the Gospel of John, "God so loved the world" from the meeting of Jesus and Nicodemus (John 3:16–21).

In his second year in Leipzig, Bach composed chorale cantatas between the first Sunday after Trinity and Palm Sunday, but for Easter returned to cantatas on more varied texts, possibly because he lost his librettist. Nine of his cantatas for the period between Easter and Pentecost are based on texts by Christiana Mariana von Ziegler, including this cantata. Bach had possibly commissioned the texts in 1724 with his first cantata cycle in mind, but he did not set music to them until 1725. He later inserted most of them in his third cantata cycle, but kept this one and Auf Christi Himmelfahrt allein, BWV 128, composed for the Feast of the Ascension, in his second cycle, possibly because they both begin with a chorale fantasia. The poet opened the cantata in an unusual way with the first stanza from Salomo Liscow's hymn (1675). It is close to the beginning of the Gospel: "For God so loved the world, that he gave his only begotten Son, that whosoever believeth in him should not perish, but have everlasting life". In the final movement, she quoted verse 18 from the Gospel, set by Bach as an unusual choral movement.

Bach led the Thomanerchor in the first performance of the cantata on 21 May 1725.

== Music ==
=== Structure and scoring ===
Bach structured the cantata in five movements and scored it for two soloists, soprano (S) and bass (B), a four-part choir (SATB), and a Baroque instrumental ensemble of a horn (Co), cornett (Cn), three trombones (Tr), two oboes (Ob), taille (Ta) (tenor oboe), two violins (Vl), viola (Va), violoncello piccolo (Vp) and basso continuo.

In the following table of the movements, the scoring follows the Neue Bach-Ausgabe. The keys and the time signature are taken from Dürr's Die Kantaten von Johann Sebastian Bach, using the symbol for common time (4/4). The continuo, playing throughout, is not shown.

Movements of Also hat Gott die Welt geliebt
No.	Title	Text	Type	Vocal	Brass	Winds	Strings	Key	Time
1	Also hat Gott die Welt geliebt	Liscow	Chorale fantasia	SATB	Co	2Ob Ta	2Vl 2Va	D minor	12/8
2	Mein gläubiges Herze	Ziegler	Aria	S		Ob	Vl Vp	F major	common time
3	Ich bin mit Petro nicht vermessen	Ziegler	Recitative	B					common time
4	Du bist geboren mir zugute	Ziegler	Aria	B		2Ob Ta		C major	12/8
5	Wer an ihn gläubet, der wird nicht gerichtet	Bible	Chorus	SATB	Co 3Tr	2Ob Ta	2Vl 2Va	A minor, D minor	common time

== Movements ==
The opening chorus is a chorale fantasia, as in Bach's chorale cantatas. The hymn melody by Gottfried Vopelius (1682) is sung by the soprano, doubled by a horn. Bach changed the rhythm of the tune from the original common time to 12/8. The musicologist Julian Mincham notes that he "embellishes it to a degree whereby 'it hardly seems like a chorale any more'".

The two arias are based on arias from Bach's 1713 Hunting Cantata (Was mir behagt, ist nur die muntre Jagd, BWV 208). The soprano aria "Mein gläubiges Herze" (My faithful heart) resembles the former aria of the shepherd goddess Pales "Weil die wollenreichen Herden" (While the herds all woolly-coated). In the church cantata, Bach used an obbligato violoncello piccolo, an instrument he experimented with in cantatas of the second cantata cycle (1724–25). John Eliot Gardiner describes it as "surely one of Bach's most refreshing and unbuttoned expressions of melodic joy and high spirits". The bass aria is based on the aria of the god Pan, "Ein Fürst ist seines Landes Pan" (A prince is his own country's Pan). Klaus Hofmann notes that the "splendid wind writing gives some hint of the pathos with which Pan ... is portrayed in Bach's hunting music".

The final movement is not, as in many church cantatas, a simple four-part chorale, but a motet-like structure which conveys a verse from the Gospel of John. The juxtaposition of "wer an ihn gläubet" (Whoever believes in Him) and "wer aber nicht gläubet" (but whoever does not believe) is expressed by a double fugue with two contrasting themes. The voices are doubled by a choir of trombones. Gardiner comments:

Invariably his settings of John's words are full of purpose, never more so than in the final chorus of BWV 68 Also hat Gott die Welt geliebt when, in place of a chorale, John postulates the chilling choice between salvation or judgement in the present life.

== Recordings ==
- Bach Made in Germany Vol. 2 – Cantatas IV, Kurt Thomas, Thomanerchor, Gewandhausorchester, Elisabeth Grümmer, Theo Adam, Eterna 1960
- J. S. Bach: Cantatas BWV 68 & BWV 70, Kurt Thomas, Kantorei der Dreikönigskirche Frankfurt, Collegium Musicum, Ingeborg Reichelt, Erich Wenk, L’Oiseau-Lyre 1962?
- Les Grandes Cantates de J.S. Bach Vol. 14, Fritz Werner, Heinrich-Schütz-Chor Heilbronn, Pforzheim Chamber Orchestra, Agnes Giebel, Jakob Stämpfli, Erato 1963
- J. S. Bach: Erschallet, ihr Lieder, Kantate BWV 172; Also hat Gott die Welt geliebt, Kantate BWV 68, Klaus Martin Ziegler, Vocalensemble Kassel, Deutsche Bachsolisten, Ursula Buckel, Jakob Stämpfli, Cantate 1966
- Bach Cantatas Vol. 3 – Ascension Day, Whitsun, Trinity’, Karl Richter, Münchener Bach-Chor, Münchener Bach-Orchester, Edith Mathis, Dietrich Fischer-Dieskau, Archiv Produktion 1975
- J. S. Bach: Das Kantatenwerk · Complete Cantatas · Les Cantates, Folge / Vol. 17 – BWV 65–68, Nikolaus Harnoncourt, Tölzer Knabenchor, Concentus Musicus Wien, soloist of the Tölzer Knabenchor, Ruud van der Meer, Teldec 1975
- Die Bach Kantate Vol. 37, Helmuth Rilling, Gächinger Kantorei, Bach-Collegium Stuttgart, Arleen Augér, Philippe Huttenlocher, Hänssler 1981
- Bach Made in Germany Vol. 4 – Cantatas II, Hans-Joachim Rotzsch, Thomanerchor, Gewandhausorchester, Arleen Augér, Theo Adam, Leipzig Classics 1981
- J. S. Bach: Cantatas with Violoncelle Piccolo, Christophe Coin, Chœur de Chambre Accentus, Ensemble Baroque de Limoges, Barbara Schlick, Gotthold Schwarz, Auvidis Astrée 1995
- Bach Cantatas Vol. 26: Long Melford / For Whit Sunday / For Whit Monday, John Eliot Gardiner, Monteverdi Choir, English Baroque Soloists, Lisa Larsson, Panajotis Iconomou, Soli Deo Gloria 2000
- Bach Edition Vol. 21 – Cantatas Vol. 12, Pieter Jan Leusink, Holland Boys Choir, Netherlands Bach Collegium, Marjon Strijk, Bas Ramselaar, Brilliant Classics 2000
- J. S. Bach: Complete Cantatas Vol. 14, Ton Koopman, Amsterdam Baroque Orchestra & Choir, Deborah York, Klaus Mertens, Antoine Marchand 2001
- J. S. Bach: Cantatas Vol. 39 – BWV 28, 68, 85, 175, 183, Masaaki Suzuki, Bach Collegium Japan, Carolyn Sampson, Peter Kooy, BIS 2007
- J. S. Bach: Himmelfahrts-Oratorium, Philippe Herreweghe, Collegium Vocale Gent, Dorothee Mields, Stephan MacLeod, Rapidshare 2008

== Sources ==
- Also hat Gott die Welt geliebt, BWV 68: Scores at the International Music Score Library Project
- Also hat Gott die Welt geliebt BWV 68; BC A 86 / Sacred cantata (2nd Day of Pentecost) Bach Digital
- Cantata BWV 68 Also hat Gott die Welt geliebt history, scoring, sources for text and music, translations to various languages, discography, discussion, Bach Cantatas Website
- BWV 68 Also hat Gott die Welt geliebt English translation, University of Vermont
- BWV 68 Also hat Gott die Welt geliebt text, scoring, University of Alberta
