= De profundis (Pärt) =

1980 musical composition by Arvo Pärt

- Anthem by Arvo Pärt
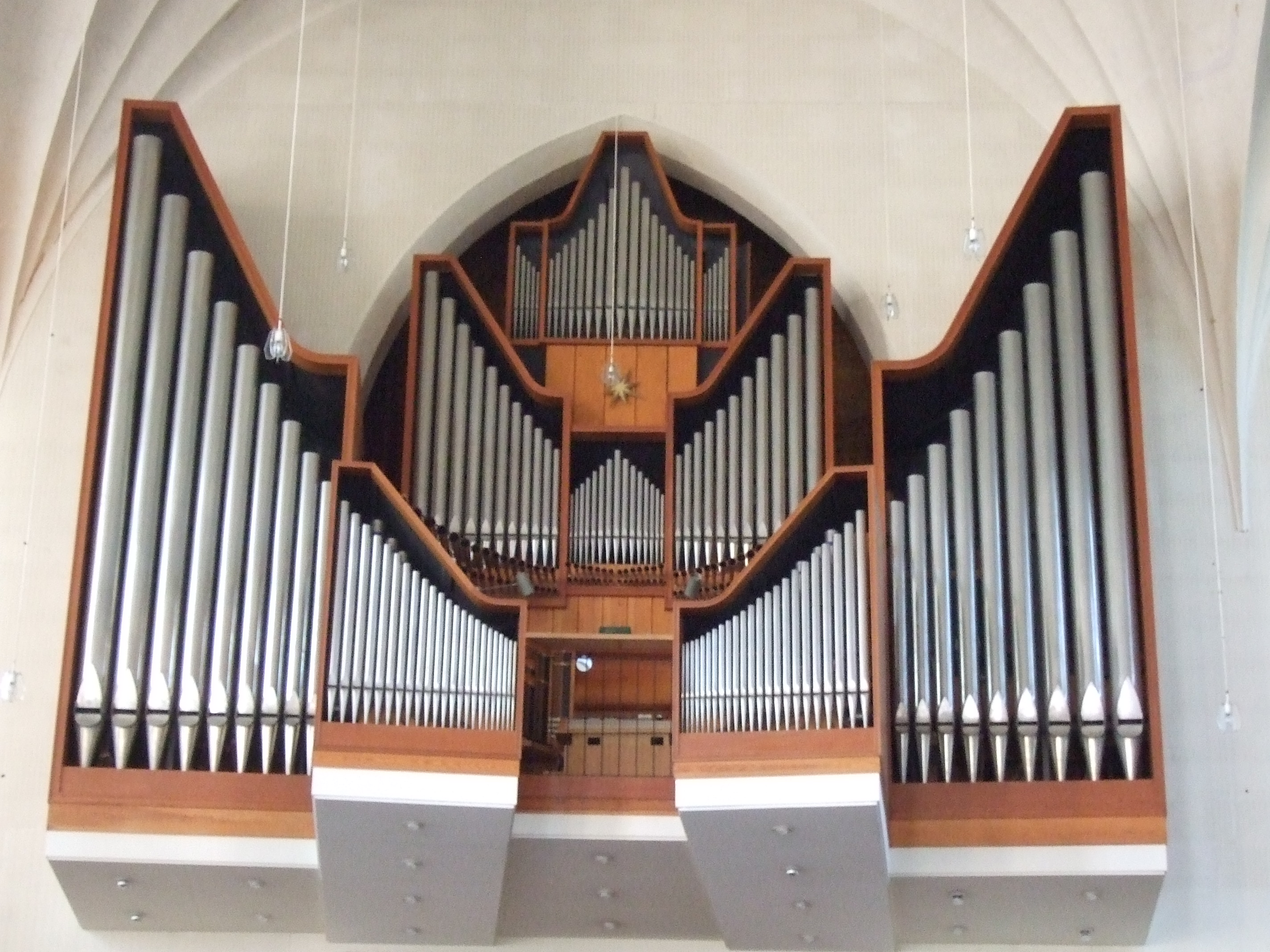
- Organ of the Martinskirche, Kassel, played in the premiere
- Text: Psalm 130
- Language: Latin
- Composed: 1980
- Dedication: Gottfried von Einem
- Performed: 25 April 1981: Kassel
- Published: by Universal Edition
- Scoring: TTBB choir; percussion (ad lib.); organ

De profundis (Out of the deep) is a choral composition by Arvo Pärt. He wrote the work in 1980, a setting of Psalm 130 in Latin for a four-part men's choir, percussion (ad. lib.) and organ. It was first performed at the Martinskirche, Kassel on 25 April 1981, conducted by Klaus Martin Ziegler. Pärt dedicated the work of around 7 minutes to Gottfried von Einem. It was published by Universal Edition. Pärt arranged it for chamber orchestra in 2008.

== History ==
Pärt composed the work a year after he left Estonia, first for Vienna and then Berlin. He set Psalm 130 in Latin, a text speaking of profound distress which has inspired composers through the centuries, from polyphonic settings by Josquin des Prez to use in an opera of the 21st century by Lera Auerbach. Pärt composed the work in his personal tintinnabuli style, using simple means of expression. He scored it for a four-part men's choir (TTBB), percussion (ad lib.) and organ, and dedicated it to the Austrian composer Gottfried von Einem. It was first performed at the Martinskirche, Kassel on 25 April 1981 by the Vokalensemble Kassel conducted by Klaus Martin Ziegler. Pärt arranged it for chamber orchestra in 2008.

== Music ==
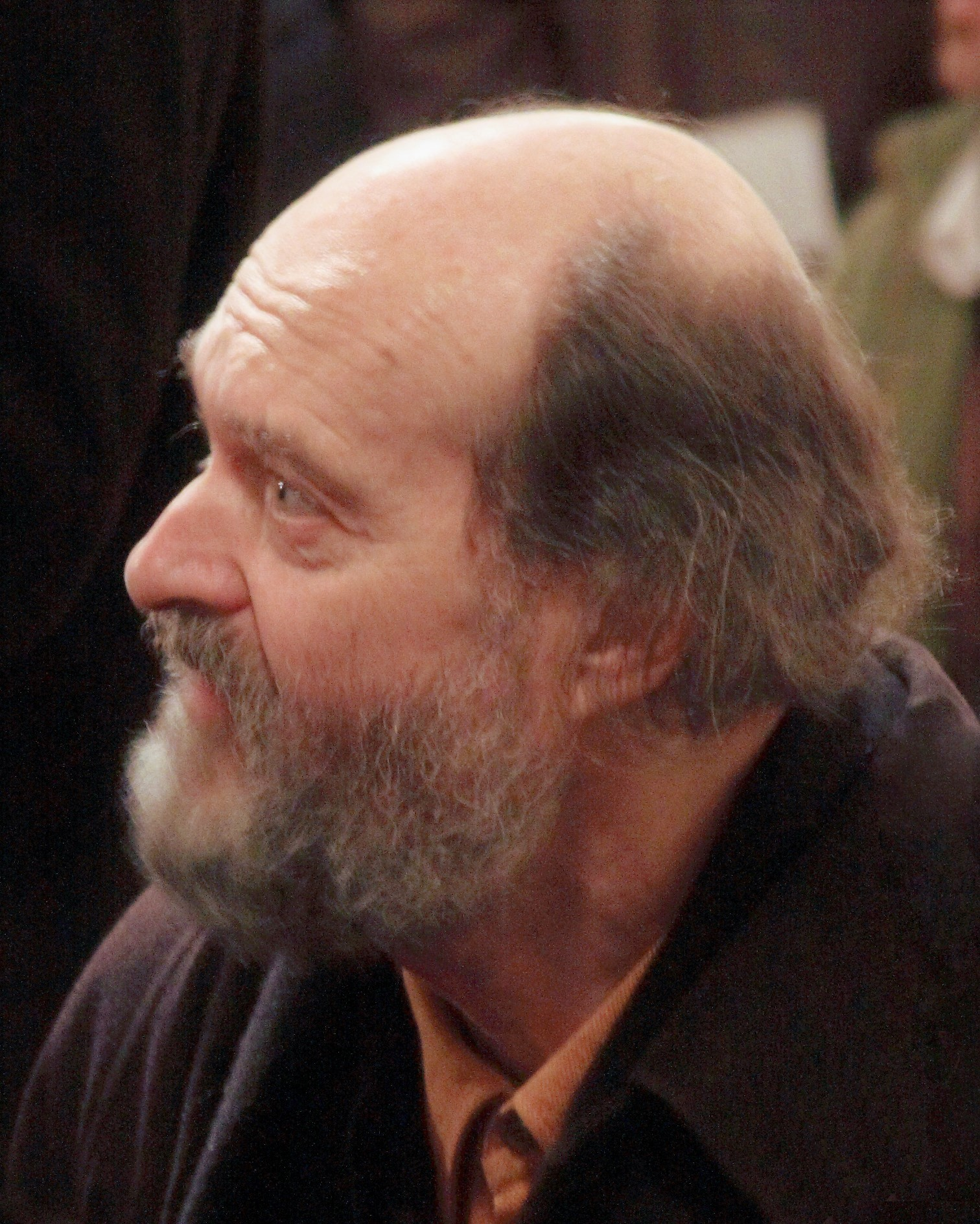
Arvo Pärt in 2008

De profundis is in one movement, set for a male choir in four parts, organ and percussion. The optional percussion might be bass drum, tam-tam and a single tubular bell. The organ provides in deep registers a slow continuous ostinato pattern. Pärt built the voices from simple melodic phrases, increasing gradually to a climax. They begin in low register, rising and reaching a passage of unison of the four parts, before returning to silence, marked by a final sound of a bell.

== Selected recordings ==
De profundis was first recorded in 1990, sung by the Hilliard Ensemble as part of the CD Arbos of sacred music by Pärt. It appears on a 1996 CD titled De Profundis, performed by the choir Theatre of Voices conducted by Paul Hillier. A reviewer wrote: "De Profundis (1980) is an impassioned and yet simple vocal setting ... where the voices climb out of the very depths of despair, with a funereal drum beat. Immediately we are drawn into an atmosphere of impassioned worship and reverence." It was recorded in 1997 by the choir Polyphony, conducted by Stephen Layton, among many other recordings. The piece closes a 2013 recording, again titled De profundis, sung by Orphei Drängar, and conducted by Cecilia Rydinger Alin. The program notes describe the composition as a meditative setting creating "a mystical atmosphere".
