= UMZE Ensemble =

Hungarian music ensemble

UMZE Chamber Ensemble
- Orchestra
- Native name: Új Magyar Zenei Egyesület
- Short name: UMZE
- Founded: 1997
- Location: Budapest, Hungary
- Principal conductor: Gergely Vajda
- Website: umze.hu/en/startpage/

The UMZE Ensemble (Hungarian: Új Magyar Zene-Egyesület, lit. 'New Hungarian Music Association') is a contemporary classical music chamber ensemble based in Budapest, Hungary. Founded in 1997 by Zoltán Rácz as a revival of an earlier society established by Béla Bartók and Zoltán Kodály in 1911, UMZE is dedicated to performing modern and experimental works.

The ensemble has premiered compositions by leading Hungarian composers such as György Kurtág and Péter Eötvös, and given the first Hungarian performances of works by international figures including Olivier Messiaen, Karlheinz Stockhausen, Steve Reich, and others. UMZE has appeared at major festivals and venues worldwide such as the Carnegie Hall in New York, the Wiener Festwochen, the Schleswig-Holstein Musik Festival, the Avignon Festival and the Huddersfield Contemporary Music Festival.

== History ==
=== Founding and early years (1911–1912) ===
The original Új Magyar Zene-Egyesület (New Hungarian Music Association, abbreviated UMZE) was founded in 1911 by a group of young Hungarian composers including Béla Bartók, Zoltán Kodály, Leó Weiner and others (Ákos Buttykay, Dezső Demény, Pongrác Kacsóh, Sándor Kovács). Their primary goal was to form a professional orchestra devoted to new music, as an alternative to the conservative Budapest Philharmonic Orchestra. Bartók later recalled that at the time “we had neither a sympathetic conductor nor a competent orchestra” to perform modern works, motivating him and Kodály to create the society in order to present new music adequately.

The Association organized a handful of concerts – including premieres of works by the founders – but lacked financial support and failed to attract sufficient audience interest. By 1912, after only three concerts, UMZE’s activities had stalled and Bartók withdrew in disappointment, effectively marking the end of the first UMZE venture.

=== Later attempts (1930s and 1940s) ===
After a long hiatus, the UMZE was re-established in December 1930 at an extraordinary general meeting. Under the new leadership of pianist-composer Pál Kadosa, it became the Hungarian section of the International Society for Contemporary Music (ISCM) and adopted an updated charter emphasizing the promotion of contemporary Hungarian and foreign composers’ works at home and abroad.

Throughout the 1930s, UMZE (as the ISCM Hungarian section) organized regular concerts in Budapest, presenting new compositions by Hungarian composers such as Ferenc Farkas, Sándor Veress, Pál Kadosa himself and others, as well as works by international modernists like Alban Berg, Edgard Varèse, Henry Cowell, Arthur Honegger, and Carl Ruggles.

The society’s concerts included thematic programs (for example, a 1933 concert of “New Hungarian cello music”) and even a rare performance of early Bartók compositions (in 1934). Plans were made to host the ISCM World Music Days in Budapest in 1940, but the outbreak of World War II prevented this.

The Association ceased activity in 1939 due to the war. Following World War II, UMZE was briefly revived once more in late 1945 in cooperation with the Hungarian Musicians' Free Trade Union. This post-war incarnation gave a few concerts in 1946, but the initiative quickly petered out and the society again dissolved by the end of 1946.

During the subsequent decades of Hungary’s communist regime, UMZE could not operate openly, and no further attempts at revival occurred in that era.

=== Revival as modern ensemble (1997–present) ===
After the fall of communism, the UMZE initiative was finally reborn. In 1997, percussionist Zoltán Rácz – founder of the acclaimed Amadinda Percussion Group – together with composer László Tihanyi and musicologist András Wilheim, established the UMZE Ensemble as a new performing group dedicated to contemporary music.

The ensemble’s name intentionally pays homage to the Bartók-Kodály society while signaling a commitment to “the new music” in the present day. UMZE gave its first performances in late 1997 (appearing under the temporary name “Festival Ensemble” at the Budapest Autumn Festival) and officially debuted as the UMZE Ensemble in March 1998 with a program of new works and premieres conducted by László Tihanyi.

During its early years, the ensemble operated on an ad hoc basis without a permanent institutional sponsor. Nevertheless, it quickly became a defining feature of Hungary’s new music scene, presenting its own concert series in Budapest and performing regularly at national events such as the Budapest Spring Festival, the Budapest Autumn Festival (now Café Budapest Contemporary Arts Festival), and the Szombathely International Bartók Seminar. UMZE also began touring internationally, appearing at prestigious venues and festivals including Carnegie Hall in New York, the Wiener Festwochen in Vienna, the Schleswig-Holstein Musik Festival, the Avignon Festival in France, and the Huddersfield Contemporary Music Festival in the UK. By commissioning and championing new compositions, the group established itself as a vital conduit for contemporary music in Hungary.

In 2005, the UMZE Association was legally re-founded as a supporting organization for the ensemble. A group of 17 leading Hungarian musicians and composers – among them György Ligeti, György Kurtág, Péter Eötvös, Zoltán Jeney, Miklós Perényi, Ferenc Rados, András Szőllősy, and others – served as the founding members of the renewed Association. With official support (including funding from the Hungarian Ministry of Culture), this move finally gave UMZE a stable institutional framework after decades of sporadic existence.

The composer László Vidovszky became the Association’s first chairman, and later the composer Balázs Horváth assumed the role of president. (As of 2025, Horváth remains president of UMZE, with László Tihanyi and Béla Simon serving as vice-presidents of the Association.) The successful establishment of the Association in 2005 marked the first time Bartók and Kodály’s UMZE concept truly took permanent root in Hungarian musical life.

== Activities and collaborations ==
UMZE’s goal is to perform contemporary works and to revive lesser known classics of 20th-century music.

Over the past two decades, the ensemble has presented numerous world premieres and Hungarian premieres. It frequently commissions new pieces by Hungarian composers and features them in its programs. Notably, UMZE gave the first performance of György Kurtág’s song cycle Four Poems by Anna Akhmatova in New York (premiered at Carnegie Hall on 31 January 2009 as part of the Extremely Hungary festival), and in March 2023 it premiered Péter Eötvös’s work Fermata in Budapest.

The ensemble has also taken on the task of introducing important international composers to Hungarian audiences – in many cases “paying off old debts” by staging the first Hungarian performances of works by figures such as Olivier Messiaen, Karlheinz Stockhausen, Steve Reich, David Lang, Jörg Widmann, Pierre Boulez, Edgard Varèse, Iannis Xenakis, Thomas Adès, and Luigi Nono, among others.

At the same time, UMZE continues to champion new compositions by Hungary’s younger generation of composers, often premiering pieces by emerging talents alongside those of established masters. The ensemble is known for innovative projects and thematic concerts. Between 2006 and 2014, UMZE and Müpa Budapest (Palace of Arts) collaborated on an ambitious Hommage à Ligeti concert series, over the course of which nearly the entire oeuvre of György Ligeti was performed with the participation of numerous Hungarian and international guest artists.

UMZE also regularly partners with other institutions on contemporary opera and theater productions. For example, in cooperation with Neue Oper Wien the ensemble took part in the first Hungarian stagings of Jörg Widmann’s opera Das Gesicht im Spiegel and Leonard Bernstein’s opera A Quiet Place (both in 2011–2012), providing the ensemble for their Hungarian premieres.

In a joint production with Müpa Budapest, UMZE also performed George Benjamin’s chamber opera Into the Little Hill in Budapest, among many other such projects. In 2023, UMZE was one of the featured ensembles at the ISCM World New Music Days festival in Johannesburg, South Africa, reflecting its international stature.

== Conductors and artistic leadership ==
Zoltán Rácz served as the UMZE Ensemble’s founding artistic director from its inception in 1997 until 2018. In December 2018, composer-conductor Gergely Vajda (also known as Gregory Vajda) succeeded Rácz as artistic director of UMZE. Since its formation, the ensemble has been led in concerts either by its directors (Rácz and Vajda) or by prominent guest conductors. The renowned composer Péter Eötvös has frequently conducted UMZE for special projects (including the 2009 Carnegie Hall concert featuring Ligeti and Kurtág works). Other conductors who have appeared with the ensemble include Zoltán Kocsis, Balázs Horváth, Zsolt Serei, Máté Hámori, Gergely Madaras, and Huba Hollókői, among others.

Despite being a chamber ensemble without a fixed roster of players, UMZE is composed of many of Hungary’s leading instrumentalists, who assemble in various configurations as required by each composition.

== Recordings ==
UMZE has released several recordings, particularly on the Budapest Music Center (BMC) label and on BIS Records, featuring contemporary works:

Péter Eötvös – Psalm 151 / Psy / Triangel (BIS Records, 1999) – featuring Zoltán Rácz (percussion) and UMZE, conducted by Péter Eötvös.

László Tihanyi – Árnyjáték / Atte (BMC Records, 1999) – UMZE conducted by László Tihanyi.

László Melis – Henoch apokalipszise (Henoch’s Apocalypse) (BMC Records, 2000).

Péter Eötvös – Intervalles-Intérieurs / Windsequenzen (BMC Records, 2003).

György Ligeti & György Kurtág – Ligeti and Kurtág at Carnegie Hall (BMC Records, 2011) – live recording of UMZE’s New York concert (conducted by Péter Eötvös).

Gergely Vajda – Barbie Blue (BMC Records, 2012) – world-premiere recording of Vajda’s one-act opera, performed by UMZE.
