= Irma Keller =

Swiss mezzo-soprano (1924–1982)

Irma Keller (20 April 1924 – 27 August 1982) was a Swiss mezzo-soprano.

After finishing her studies in Zurich, Irma Keller joined the Theatre of St. Gallen for a year in 1948 and sang at the Zürich Opera House from 1955 to 1957. From 1957 to 1959 she belonged to the Frankfurt Opera, in which she appeared in the premiere of Arnold Schoenberg's Moses und Aron in June 1957, and from 1959 to 1961 she sang at the Cologne Opera. She gained significant attention for singing alto on Klaus Martin Ziegler's recording of Bach's Erschallet, ihr Lieder, erklinget, ihr Saiten! BWV 172, with Ursula Buckel, Theo Altmeyer, and Jakob Stämpfli in 1966.
