= Klaus Martin Ziegler =

German conductor and musician (1929–1993)

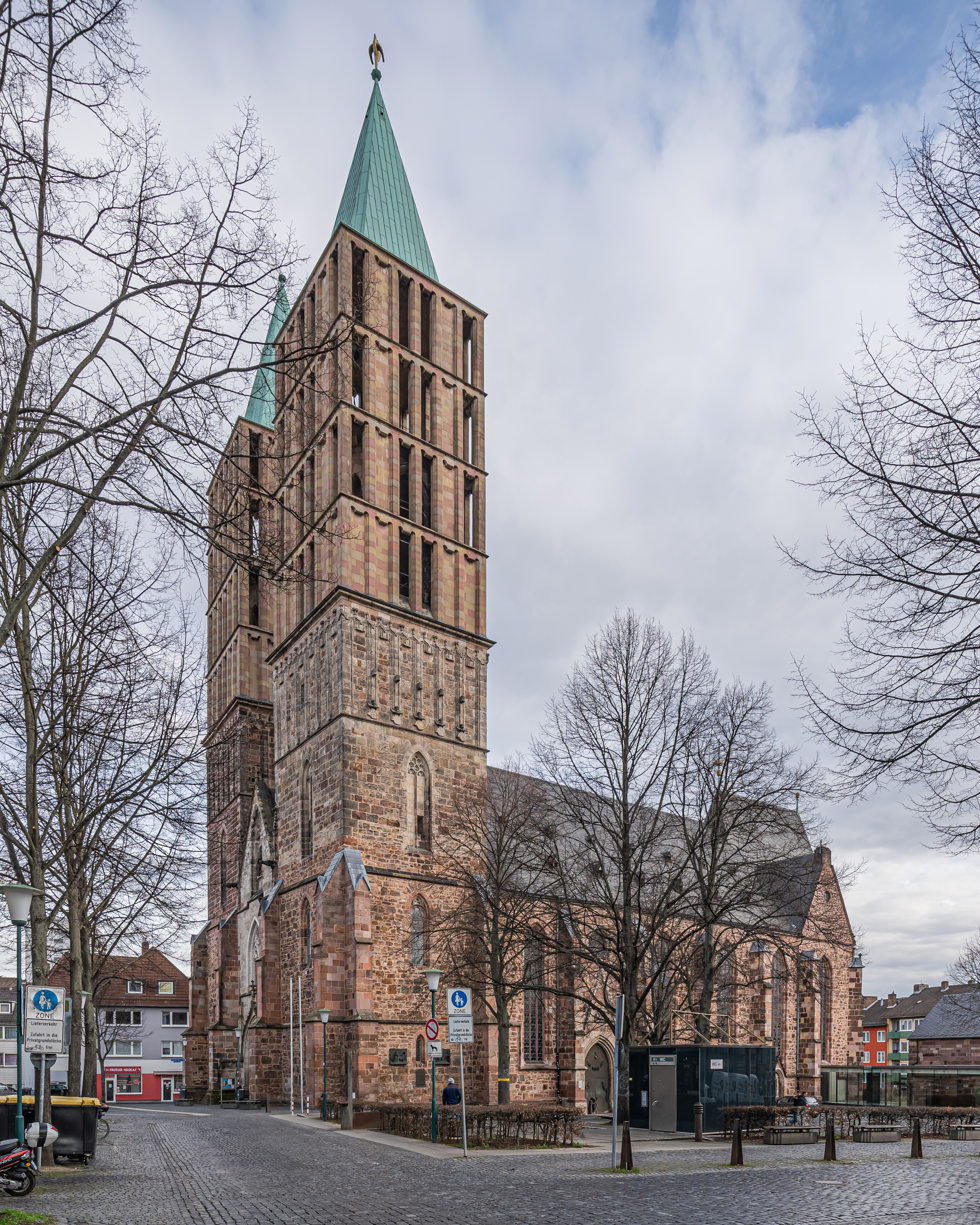
Martinskirche, Kassel

Klaus Martin Ziegler (23 February 1929 – 22 September 1993) was a German choral conductor, organist and Protestant church musician.

== Career ==
Ziegler was born in Freiburg. He studied music at the Hochschule für Musik Karlsruhe and matriculated from 1948 to 1950 as an examined Kapellmeister. He continued studies of sacred music at the Kirchenmusikalisches Institut Heidelberg from 1950 to 1952 with Wolfgang Fortner, Meinhard Hermann Poppen and Gerhard Nestler. He was cantor, from 1952 to 1954 in Karlsruhe-Rüppurr and from 1954 to 1960 at the Christuskirche in Karlsruhe. In 1957 he became head of the church music department at the Badische Hochschule für Musik. He also held a teaching position at the Pädagogische Hochschule Karlsruhe.

From 1960 to 1993 he was a cantor at the Martinskirche, Kassel. He founded the Kantorei St. Martin and determined from the beginning to perform both old and new music in services, presenting in his first service music by Dieterich Buxtehude, Johann Walther (1755–1822), Hugo Distler and Joseph Marx, and in an Advent concert Bach's Magnificat and Stravinsky's Mass. Ziegler founded in 1965 the Vocalensemble Kassel, with whom he performed at the Donaueschingen Festival. In 1967 he was appointed director of church music. In 1968 he became artistic director of the Evangelische Kirchenmusikschule Schlüchtern where he taught contemporary music and choral conducting from 1970 to 1981. He was also the director of the Kantorei (chorale) at the Westfälischen Kirchenmusikschule Herford. From 1981 to 1987 he succeeded Marinus Voorberg as director of the Südfunk-Chor Stuttgart, adding to its artistic profile by featuring contemporary music by composers such as Luciano Berio, Dieter Schnebel, Mathias Spahlinger and Adriana Hölszky. He shaped the festival Kasseler Musiktage, which had been founded in 1933, making Kassel a center of new sacred music in Europe. In 1977, his own former biennial "Woche für geistliche Musik" (Week for sacred music) became part of the festival as "Neue Musik in der Kirche" (New music in the church). He was responsible for the programming there until his death, first with Wolfgang Rehm, then with Leo Karl Gerhartz. Numerous sacred works were premiered under his direction, including Heinz Werner Zimmermann's motet Herr, mache mich zum Werkzeug Deines Friedens (1959, with the Kantorei of the Christuskirche Karlsruhe), Wir haben eine Hoffnung (We have a hope) by Dietrich von Bausznern (1965 at the Donaueschingen Festival), and the Mass "Gebet der armen Seele" (Prayer of the poor soul) by Giselher Klebe (Kasseler Musiktage).

He died in Kassel at age 64.

== Recordings ==
Ziegler recorded with his Vocalensemble Kassel and soloists Ursula Buckel, Irma Keller, Theo Altmeyer and Jakob Stämpfli, Bach's cantatas for Pentecost Also hat Gott die Welt geliebt, BWV 68, and Erschallet, ihr Lieder, erklinget, ihr Saiten! BWV 172.

He recorded the cantata Du sollst nicht töten by Karl Heinz Wahren, scored for speaker, jazz soloists, choir and orchestra, with the RIAS Kammerchor and orchestra.

A collection of "Neue Musik in der Kirche", published after his death, demonstrates his proficiency both as a conductor and as an organist. It contains Schoenberg's De profundis Op. 50b (1950) and Friede auf Erden Op. 13 (1907), both performed by the Vocalensemble Kassel, John Cage's organ piece Souvenir (1983), Dieter Schnebel's Lamento di guerra for alto and organ (1991), Arne Mellnäs' Omnia tempus habent (1972), and Heinz Werner Zimmermann's Psalmkonzert (1956), performed by soloist Barry McDaniel, instrumentalists, the choir of the Christuskirche Karlsruhe and the Knabenchor Hannover.

== Legacy ==
An award in his name, the Klaus-Martin-Ziegler-Preis, is given annually in Kassel for new sacred music. It was given to composers László Tihanyi in 2002, Dominik Susteck in 2008, and Michael Töpel in 2011, among others.

== Literature ==
- Kantorei an St. Martin Kassel (ed.): Fünfundzwanzig Jahre Kantorei an St. Martin-Vocalensemble Kassel (1985)
- Helmut Fleinghaus, Uwe Karsten Groß, Lebrecht Schilling (ed.): 40 Jahre Westfälische Landeskirchenmusikschule Herford 1948–1988 (1988)
- Alain Pâris: Klassische Musik im 20. Jahrhundert (1997), ps. 62–63
- Heiko Bockstiegel: Meine Herren, kennen Sie das Stück? Erinnerungen an deutschsprachige Chordirigenten des 20. Jahrhunderts (1999), 286–92
