= Genitrix (opera) =

Hungarian opera by László Tihanyi

Genitrix is an opera in two acts by the Hungarian contemporary composer, László Tihanyi. The libretto, based on the novel by Francois Mauriac, is by László Tihanyi and Alain Surrans. The piece was commissioned by the French State and the Opéra National de Bordeaux and was composed between 2001 and 2007. The world premiere took place on 25 November 2007 at the Grand-Théatre, Bordeaux. The Hungarian premiere was in March 2008 at the Palace of Arts, Budapest. The opera has a running time of approximately two hours and 30 minutes.
