= László Tihanyi =

Hungarian composer and conductor (born 1956)

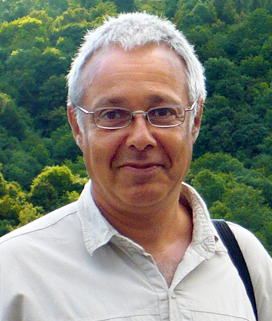
- László Tihanyi composer (2011)

Background information
- Born: László Tihanyi; 21 March 1956 (age 70); Budapest, Hungary
- Genres: Contemporary classical music
- Occupations: Composer, conductor, professor of the Hungarian Liszt Academy of Music
- Years active: 1974 – present
- Website: http://tihanyilaszlo.hu/

László Tihanyi (born 21 March 1956) is a Hungarian composer and conductor.

== Biography ==
László Tihanyi was born in Budapest, Hungary, on 21 March 1956, and pursued musical studies at the Franz Liszt Academy of Music, Budapest, where he studied composition with Rezső Sugár and conducting with András Kórodi. Since 1979, Tihanyi serves as a devoted professor at the Academy of Music, where he acted also as vice-rector between 2000 and 2005.

He regularly conducts at home and abroad, typically 20th century classical and contemporary programmes. He appeared with all major Hungarian orchestras and significant European contemporary music ensembles, as Ensemble Modern, Contrechamps and MusikFabrik. In 1991, he participated in the production of Maderna's Hyperion at the Festival D'Automne à Paris and the subsequent European tour. In 2002, Péter Eötvös asked him to be second conductor of his opera Three Sisters for the 2002 production for the Wiener Festwochen (besides Eötvös being first conductor himself).

In 1985, founded his own instrumental ensemble, the Intermodulation, dedicated to 20th and 21st Century music, and has been the artistic director since then. Tihanyi is the winner of prestigious awards, including the Erkel prize and the Bartók-Pásztory prize.

Beside being the "composer-in-residence" of the Ensemble Intermodulation, his works are performed all over Europe: the Hungarian Radio commissioned Irrlichtspiel, for violin and ensemble (a "pocket" concerto) in 1991. Then the Componensemble premiered Winterszenen (a work based on Schubert’s Winterreise). In 1992, Summer Music was dedicated to and premiered by the Ensemble Contrechamps in 1992, one of the as yet most performed chamber setting by Tihanyi. In 1994 L’Épitaph du Soldat (a short sequel to Stravinsky's A Soldier's Tale) was commissioned by Radio France, and Serenata for four instruments by Rainbow over Bath in 1996. Schattenspiel was composed for members of the Forrás Chamber Music Workshop in 1997, and premiered in its original, four-movement version in the same year in Vienna. In 1998, two Swiss foundations, Pro Helvetia and the Zuger Kulturstiftung Landis & Gyr commissioned Matrix for four hands. Atte was premiered in 1999 in Berlin by the UMZE Ensemble. The soloists were Csaba Klenyán (clarinet) and György Déri (cello). In 2002, Musikfabrik premiered Kosmos, and a number of further commissions followed, one of which was the 20 Night Meditations for 8 soloists and orchestra with double strings, that had its western hemisphere premiere in February 2007 at The Juilliard School, New York.

His commission by the Opéra National de Bordeaux and the French state for his first opera Genitrix, based on the novel by François Mauriac, premiered on 25 November 2007 in Bordeaux.

== Prizes and awards ==
- 2002 - Klaus Martin Ziegler prize of the city of Kassel, Germany
- 2001 - Bartók-Pásztory prize
- 1999 - "Merite culturel" prize from the Polish Minister of Culture and Science
- 1997 - Erkel prize
- 1986, 1988, 1989, 1992, 1993, 1998 - Artisjus prize
- 1988 - Special prize of the Association of Hungarian Musicians
- 1981 - Szirmai Albert prize

== Main works ==
- 2012: Clausula No. 4. - for alto flute, viola, cello and piano
- 2012: Rundherum - for piano and string quartet
- 2011: 50 misure a S. (50 Bars for S.) for violin and viola, Op. 56
- 2011: Two Imaginary Dialogues - for ensemble
- 2011: Preludie, Invocation and Postlude - for violin, viola and cello
- 2010–2011: Nyolc invokáció a Hold fázisaihoz (Eight Invocations to the Lunar Phases) for viola and piano, Op. 53
- 2010: Arnis - for harp solo and ensemble
- 2009: Passacaglie for viola and orchestra, Op. 49
- 2009: Epilegomena (Jan Jansson on the Milkyway) - for flute solo and orchestra
- 2008–2009: Genitrix – 1. szvit - for tenor and orchestra
- 2008: 8 Scenes from the Genitrix - for Ms, tenor, bariton and orchestra
- 2001–2007: Genitrix - Opera in two acts, based on the novel by François Mauriac, libretto by László Tihanyi and Alain Surrans, text in French
- 2002: 20 Night Meditations - for 8 solo instruments and orchestra
- 2002: Matrix/Kosmos - for piano four hands and ensemble
- Jan 2001 - Jun 2002: Linos - for harp
- 2001: Nächtliche Klauseln - for organ
- 1999: Atte - for clarinet, violoncello and ensemble
- 1998: Pimpalin’s Gown - A musical play for a speaking voice and six instruments, based on a tale by Alíz Mosonyi, in Hungarian
- 1998: Matrix - for piano four hands
- 1997: Schattenspiel - for clarinet in A, violoncello and piano
- 1996: Serenata - for four instruments
- 1995 - 1996: The Passing of the Neptune - for piano
- 1995: Triton - for bassoon and ensemble
- 1994: Epitaph of the Soldier - for seven instruments
- 1992, rev. 1994: Tra duzioni - for double symphony orchestra, two small string orchestras and six female voices
- 1992: Summer Music - for six instruments
- 1991: Winter Scenes - for ensemble
- 1991: Night Scene - for four instruments
- 1989: Arkhé - for orchestra
- 1987, rev. 1995: Jan Jansson’s Journey from Denmark to Denmark (A Transcendent Musical Travel in Five Scenes) - for flute
- 1986: Enodios - for orchestra
- 1986: Ductus for viola solo, Op. 3
- 1984 - 1985: Krios (The Month of Ram) - for small orchestra
- 1984: Silence of the Winds - for ensemble
- 1984: Szirom (Petal) - for an optional (keyboard) instrument
- 1977: Deux sonates à Olivier Messiaen (Two Sonatas for Olivier Messiaen) - for violin and piano
