= Wer mich liebet, der wird mein Wort halten, BWV 59 =

Church cantata by Johann Sebastian Bach

Wer mich liebet, der wird mein Wort halten
- BWV 59
- Church cantata by J. S. Bach
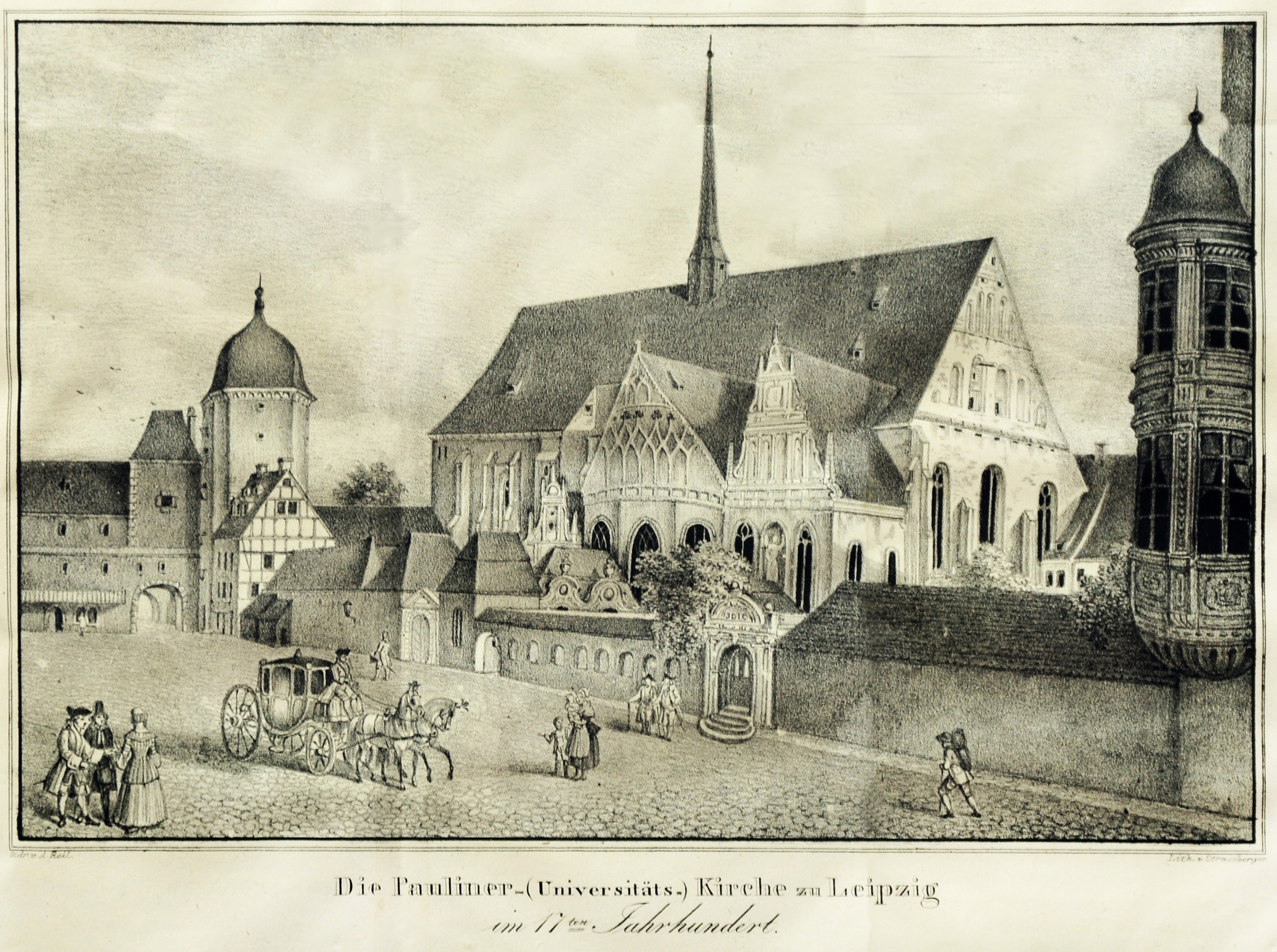
- Paulinerkirche, Leipzig, 17th-century lithography
- Related: basis for BWV 74
- Occasion: Pentecost
- Cantata text: Erdmann Neumeister
- Bible text: John 14:23–31
- Chorale: from Komm, Heiliger Geist, Herre Gott
- Performed: 16 May 1723?: Leipzig; 28 May 1724
- Movements: 4
- Vocal: solo: soprano and bass; SATB choir
- Instrumental: 2 trumpets; timpani; 2 violins; viola; continuo

Wer mich liebet, der wird mein Wort halten (Whoever loves me will keep my word), BWV 59, is a church cantata by Johann Sebastian Bach. He composed the cantata for Pentecost and probably first performed it in Leipzig on 28 May 1724, but an earlier performance on 16 May 1723 at the Paulinerkirche, the University Church of Leipzig, is possible.

== History and words ==
Bach wrote the cantata for Pentecost Sunday. The prescribed readings for the feast day were from the Acts of the Apostles, the Holy Spirit (Acts 2:1–13), and from the Gospel of John, Jesus announcing in his Farewell Discourse the Spirit who will teach (John 14:23–31). The cantata is based on a text of Erdmann Neumeister, published in 1714. Bach composed only four movements of the seven of the poetry. The cantata begins with the first verse of the gospel, which Bach had set already as a recitative for bass in his cantata for Pentecost Erschallet, ihr Lieder, erklinget, ihr Saiten! BWV 172, composed in Weimar in 1714 on a text of Salomon Franck. In the second movement, the poet praises the great love of God. The third movement is the first stanza of Martin Luther's hymn for Pentecost, "Komm, Heiliger Geist, Herre Gott", asking for the coming of the Holy Spirit. In an unusual closing aria, the poet deals with the expected greater bliss in heaven.

Bach certainly performed the cantata on 28 May 1724, which may have been the first performance. The score dates from around 1718, but the parts were written in 1724. Pentecost of 1723 occurred before Bach officially started his tenure as Thomaskantor in Leipzig on the first Sunday after Trinity. The possibility of a performance already on 16 May 1723, perhaps in a service of the university, as Arnold Schering suggested, has been discussed. Bach used and expanded parts of the cantata in Wer mich liebet, der wird mein Wort halten, BWV 74, for Pentecost of 1725.

== Scoring and structure ==
The cantata in four movements is scored for two soloists, soprano and bass, a four-part choir only in the chorale, two trumpets, timpani, two violins, viola and basso continuo. Compared to a typical festive orchestra, it lacks a third trumpet and woodwinds.

1. Duet (soprano, bass): Wer mich liebet, der wird mein Wort halten
2. Recitative (soprano): O was sind das vor Ehren
3. Chorale: Komm, Heiliger Geist, Herre Gott
4. Aria (bass): Die Welt mit allen Königreichen

== Music ==
The first movement is an extended duet, which repeats the text five times. In four sections, the voices imitate each other, using different intervals and various keys; in the final section they sing united in parallels of sixths. The instruments begin with a short prelude, which introduces a motif later sung on the words "Wer mich liebet" with a short melisma on "mich" (me). This motif begins every section.

Movement 2 begins as a recitative with string accompaniment, but ends as an arioso with continuo on the final lines "Ach, daß doch, wie er wollte ihn auch ein jeder lieben sollte" (Ah, that only, as he wishes, everyone might also love him).

In the chorale, two violins play partly independent parts, achieving a full sound. The chorale is followed by an aria with an obbligato violin. Scholars have discussed if this unusual ending of the cantata was Bach's intention or if he had planned to conclude the work with Neumeister's fifth movement, another chorale. John Eliot Gardiner chose to repeat the chorale, performing its third stanza.

== Recordings ==
- Bach Made in Germany Vol. 2 – Cantatas II, Kurt Thomas, Thomanerchor, Gewandhausorchester, Agnes Giebel, Theo Adam, Eterna 1959
- J. S. Bach: Kantaten · Cantatas Nr. 27, Nr. 118, Nr. 158, Nr. 59, Jaap Schröder, Amsterdamer Kantorei, Concerto Amsterdam, Rotraud Hansmann, Max van Egmond, Telefunken 1967
- J. S. Bach: Das Kantatenwerk – Sacred Cantatas Vol. 3, Nikolaus Harnoncourt, Tölzer Knabenchor, Concentus Musicus Wien, soloist of the Wiener Sängerknaben, Ruud van der Meer, Teldec 1976
- Die Bach Kantate Vol. 35, Helmuth Rilling, Gächinger Kantorei, Bach-Collegium Stuttgart, Arleen Augér, Niklaus Tüller, Hänssler 1977
- J. S. Bach: Complete Cantatas Vol. 6, Ton Koopman, Amsterdam Baroque Orchestra & Choir, Ruth Ziesak, Klaus Mertens, Antoine Marchand 1997

== Sources ==
- Wer mich liebet, der wird mein Wort halten, BWV 59: Scores at the International Music Score Library Project
- Cantata BWV 59 Wer mich liebet, der wird mein Wort halten: history, scoring, sources for text and music, translations to various languages, discography, discussion, Bach Cantatas Website
- BWV 59 Wer mich liebet, der wird mein Wort halten: English translation, University of Vermont
- BWV 59 Wer mich liebet, der wird mein Wort halten: text, scoring, University of Alberta
- Luke Dahn: BWV 59.3 bach-chorales.com
