= Salomon Liscovius =

Salomon Liscovius or Salmon Lischkow or Salomon Liscow (25 October 1640 – 5 December 1689) was a German psalmist. According to Högmarck, Liscovius was a clergyman in the German princedom of Halberstadt. He is represented in the Swedish Psalm Books from 1695 to 1937 with the original texts of four works in the 1695th Psalm Book, two of which remain in 1937 Psalm Book 285 and 290).

== Biography ==
Born to Johann Liscovius, or Lischkow, pastor at Niemitzsch, near Guben in Lower Lusatia, October 25, 1640. He entered the University of Leipzig in 1660, and then to Wittenberg. He was appointed pastor at Otterwisch, near Lausigk, and ordained to this post on April 21, 1664. On March 29, 1685, he was appointed second pastor of St. Wenceslaus's church, at Wurzen. He died at Wurzen, December 5, 1689.

== Hymns ==
- How can and should I? (1695 No. 20) according to Högmarck's accounts Liscovius composed in German as a prayer. Later enrolled Johann Heermann who dictated the text already in 1632.
- Debt Register, God (1695 No. 256, 1937 No. 285) written 1683, first to the same melody as for Then Revelation (1695 No. 293) but later to the same as Well Me In Eternity.
- O maniskia wil tu betänckia (1695 No. 210), like a prayer.
- Welt me forever (1695 No. 241, 1937 No. 290) written in 1683.
