= Café Budapest Contemporary Arts Festival =

Hungarian arts festival

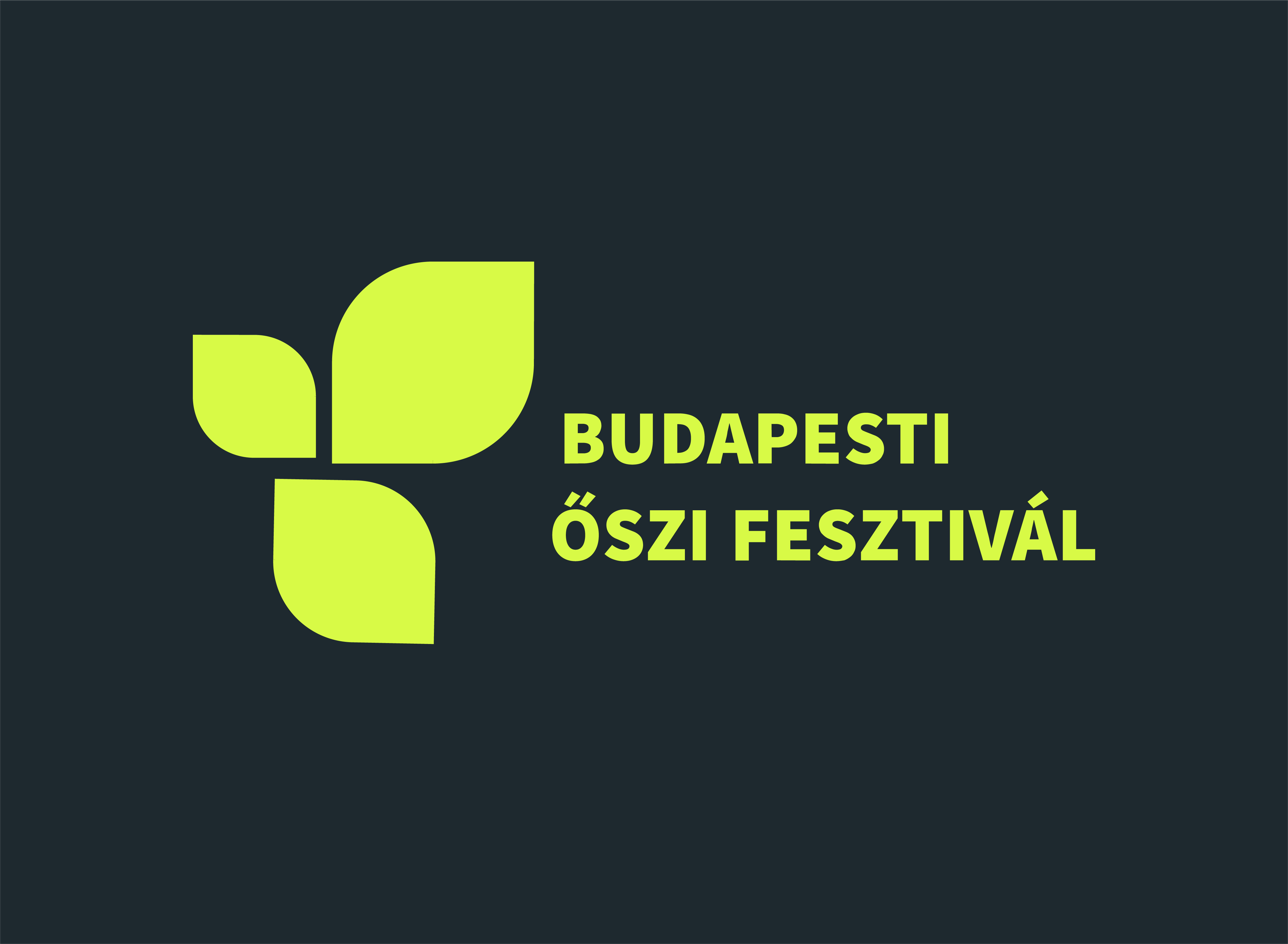

The Café Budapest Contemporary Arts Festival, formerly the Budapest Autumn Festival (Hungarian: Budapesti Őszi Fesztivál, pronounced [ˈbudɒpɛʃti ˈøːsi ˈfɛstivaːl]) is an annual dance, jazz, theatre, poetry and fine arts festival founded in Budapest in 1992. The festival usually takes place in early October.

Like the Budapest Spring Festival, the Autumn Festival is also sponsored by the city, but the content is more geared to modern and avant-garde arts.

The festival overlaps with the classical Budapest Music Weeks in late September to early November.
