= St Martin's Church, Kassel =

Protestant church in Kassel, Hesse, Germany

St Martin's Church
- Martinskirche
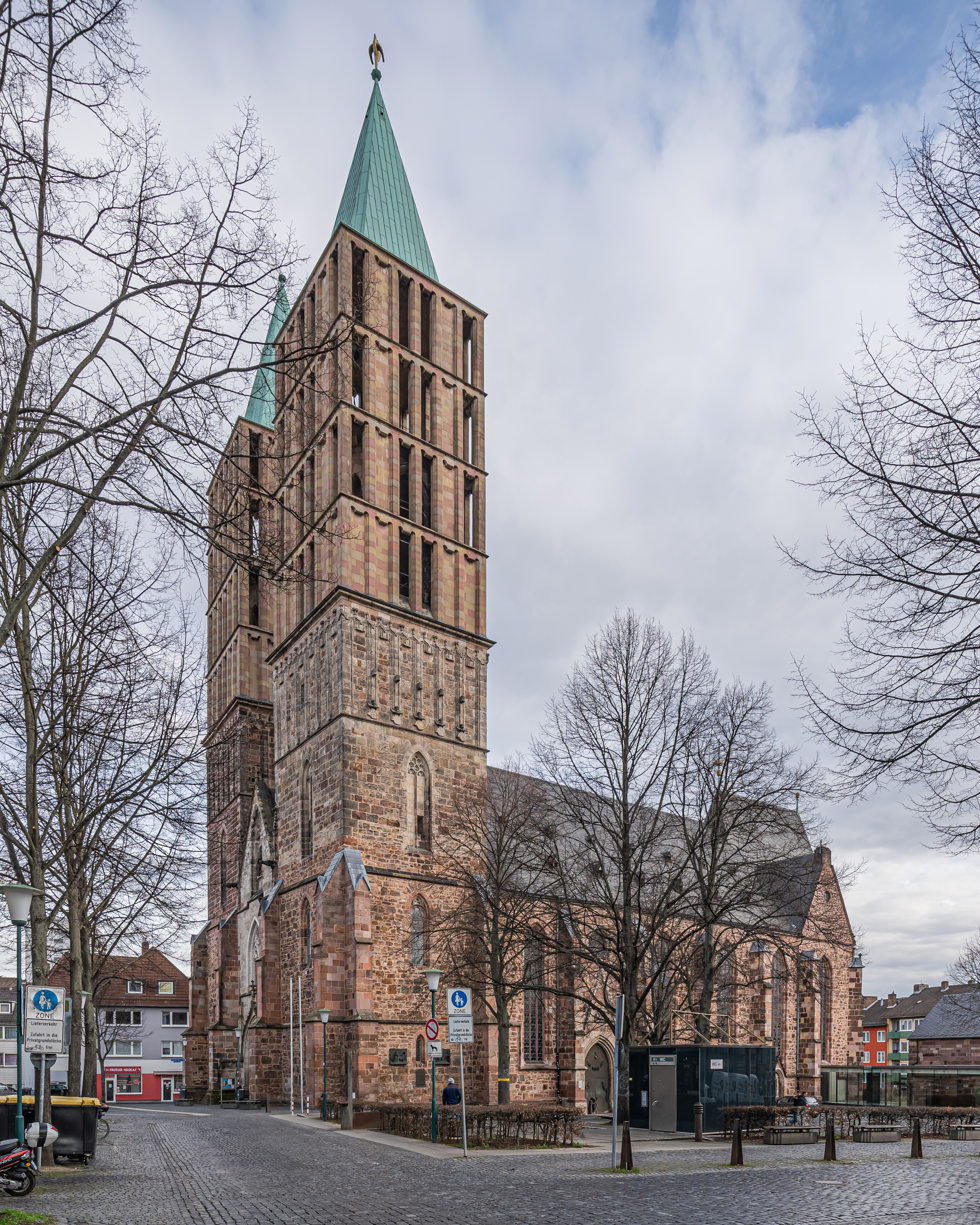
- St Martin's Church
- 51.3172°N 9.5011°E
- Location: Kassel, Hesse, Germany
- Country: Germany
- Denomination: Lutheran
- Previous denomination: Roman Catholic

Architecture
- Style: Gothic

St Martin's Church (German: Martinskirche) is a Protestant parish church in Kassel, Hesse, Germany. It is also the preaching-church of the bishop of the Evangelical Church of Hesse Electorate-Waldeck. It is in the Gothic style and was begun in 1364 and completed in 1462, dedicated to St. Martin of Tours. It became a Protestant church in 1524, when Philip I, Landgrave of Hesse converted to Protestantism. From the 16th century until the end of the 18th century it was the burial place for the landgraves of Hesse.

It was rebuilt to a slightly modified plan after the Second World War. It is a three-aisle six-bayed hall church with two towers at the west end. Its '5/8-Schluss' choir dates to the Gothic period - this style is named after the eight segments to the vaults in the five east-end arches. From 1960 until his death in 1993 the organist Klaus Martin Ziegler was the church's cantor.

== History ==
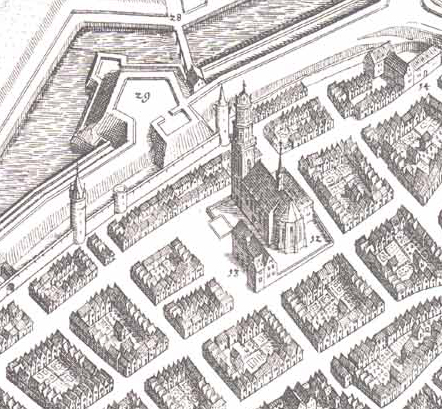
The Martinskirche on a map by Matthäus Merian, 1646

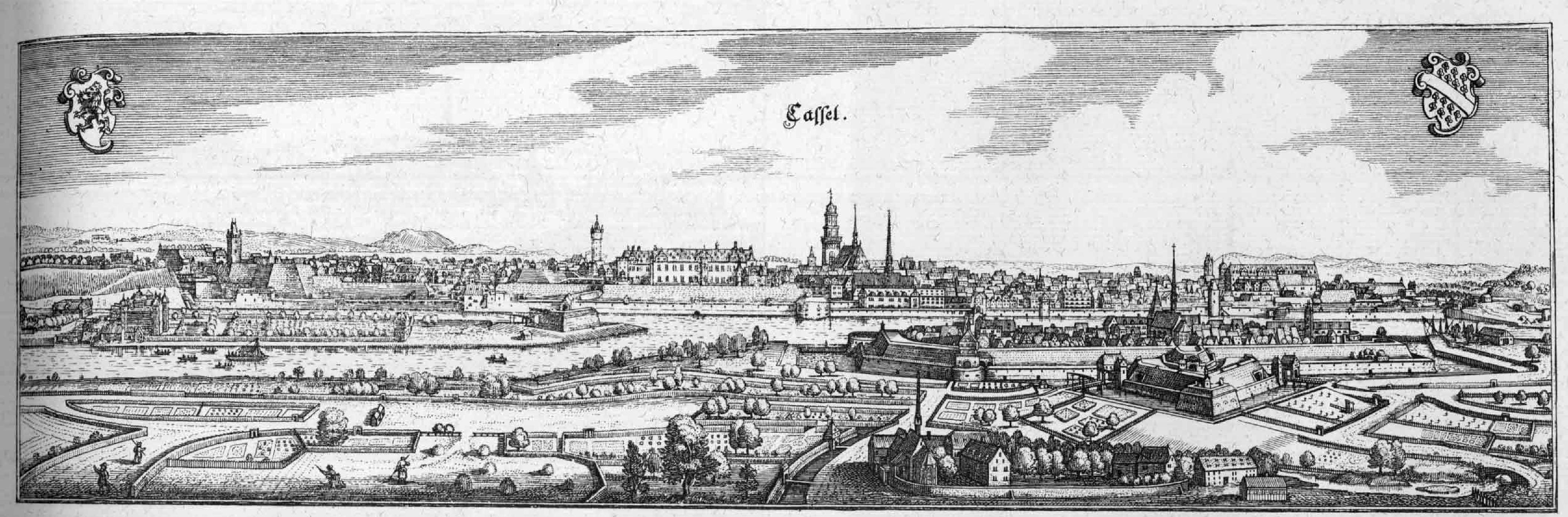
Kassel - Excerpt from Topographia Hassiae by Matthäus Merian 1655 - the Martinskirche is in the centre.

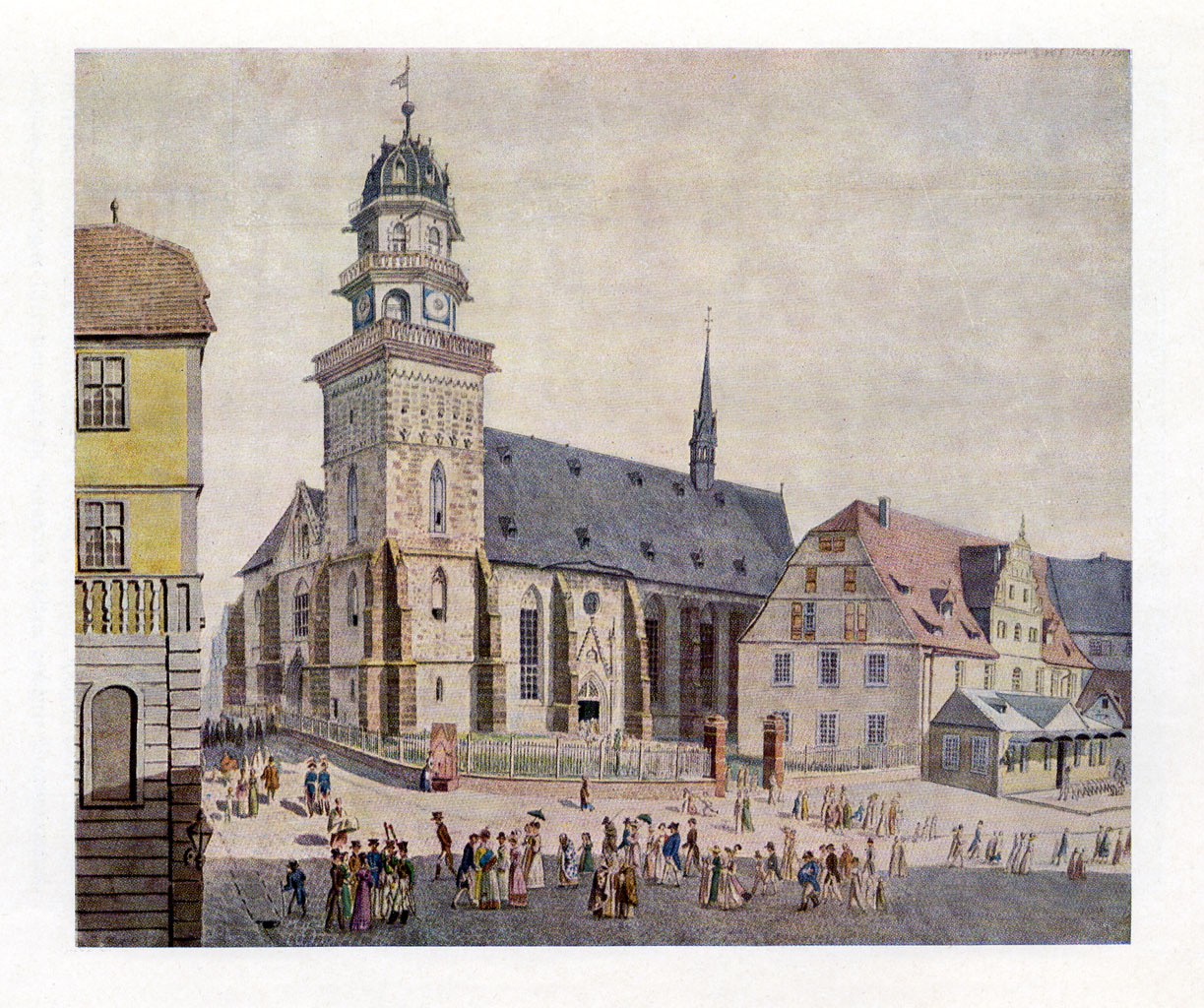
The Martinskirche in 1820 Painting by Ludwig Grimm

=== Early history ===
In 1330, with the construction of the new district of 'Freiheit', it was decided that Kassel needed another city-centre church. In 1343 the Bishop of Mainz proclaimed an indulgence to pay for it. This led to the construction of the quire of the present church, now used as the parish church. The church was dedicated the Virgin Mary, St Martin of Tours and Elizabeth of Hungary.

A stift was settled on the new church to pay for a nave (like that at Ahnaberg Convent) run by the Premonstratensians. The stift was set up in 1366-67 and Pope Urban V confirmed a new construction phase to provide a parish church whilst the quire was handed over to the canons. Several of the church's canons took offices at the Hessian court in the period running up to the Reformation. In 1437 Louis I, Landgrave of Hesse brought a relic of the True Cross back to Kassel, meaning the Martinskirche was also sometimes known as the Stift of the Holy Cross (Stift zum Heiligen Kreuz).

Work on the nave was slow and after two more construction phases one of the nave vaults collapsed in 1440. It only proved possible finally to consecrate the nave in 1462. The south tower was intended as a single tower until 1487 - it first received its distinctive octagonal structures in 1564-65, finished with an onion dome.

=== Modern era ===
During his time as king of Westphalia, Jérôme Bonaparte tried to transfer the seat of the Paderborn Archdiocese to Kassel and make the Martinskirche into a cathedral, but his brother Napoleon I prevented him. At the end of the 19th century the unfinished building was redesigned and completed by the architect Hugo Schneider (builder of the Luther Church). From 1889 to 1892 he built the north tower and replaced the Renaissance-style south tower with one in the Neo-Gothic style.

The church was severely damaged by British bombing in 1943, causing the nave to collapse. During the raid on 22 October that year, the sandstone walls of the church were so badly damaged that they had to be repaired with shotcrete and a wooden lattice-work. The reconstruction from 1954 until 1958 was headed by Heinrich Otto Vogel from Trier - the nave was reconstructed, but the steeples replaced with modern ones. The alabaster and marble monument to Philip the Magnanimous was moved to the middle of the central nave in 1955. A service of re-dedication was held on 1 June 1958. In 1964 a three-manual organ with 57 registers and over 5000 pipes was installed.

Since 1997 a light-installation by Christina Kubisch has been housed in the church. It has also housed three contemporary art exhibitions - Documenta X in 1997 ('Staging and Visualisation - Aesthetic and religious experience today'), Documenta XI in 2002 ('The free view') and Documenta XII in 2007 ('Sight and Hearing - on the relationship between image, word and sound'). Between 2010 and 2012 Madeleine Dietz redesigned the church's altar, chancel, font and ambo.

== Bells ==
The two towers contain seven newly cast bells, all cast and consecrated in 1961. The two largest bells hang in the south tower, they are Lord's Prayer bell, which has marked the hours with its chimes since 2000, and the bourdon bell Osanna, also known as the Christ Bell. The Osanna is only heard on Good Friday and during the memorial service on October 22nd. On major church holidays, all seven bells ring together. The old, destroyed Osanna bell is displayed in the church's vestibule. In Germany, the bells are always numbered from largest to smallest, Bell 1 is always the tenor or bourdon.

Bell Number	Bell Name (German)	Bell Name (English)	Mass (Kg)	Tower
1	Christusglocke/Osanna	Christ Bell/Osanna (Bourdon)	5300	South Tower
2	Vaterunserglocke	Lord's Prayer bell	3100	South Tower
3	Abendglocke	Evening bell	1850	North Tower
4	Mittagsglocke	Midday bell	1550	North Tower
5	Taufglocke	Baptismal bell	1100	North Tower
6	Morgenglocke	Morning bell	850	North Tower
7	Abendmahlsglocke	Communion bell	600	North Tower

== Princely tombs ==
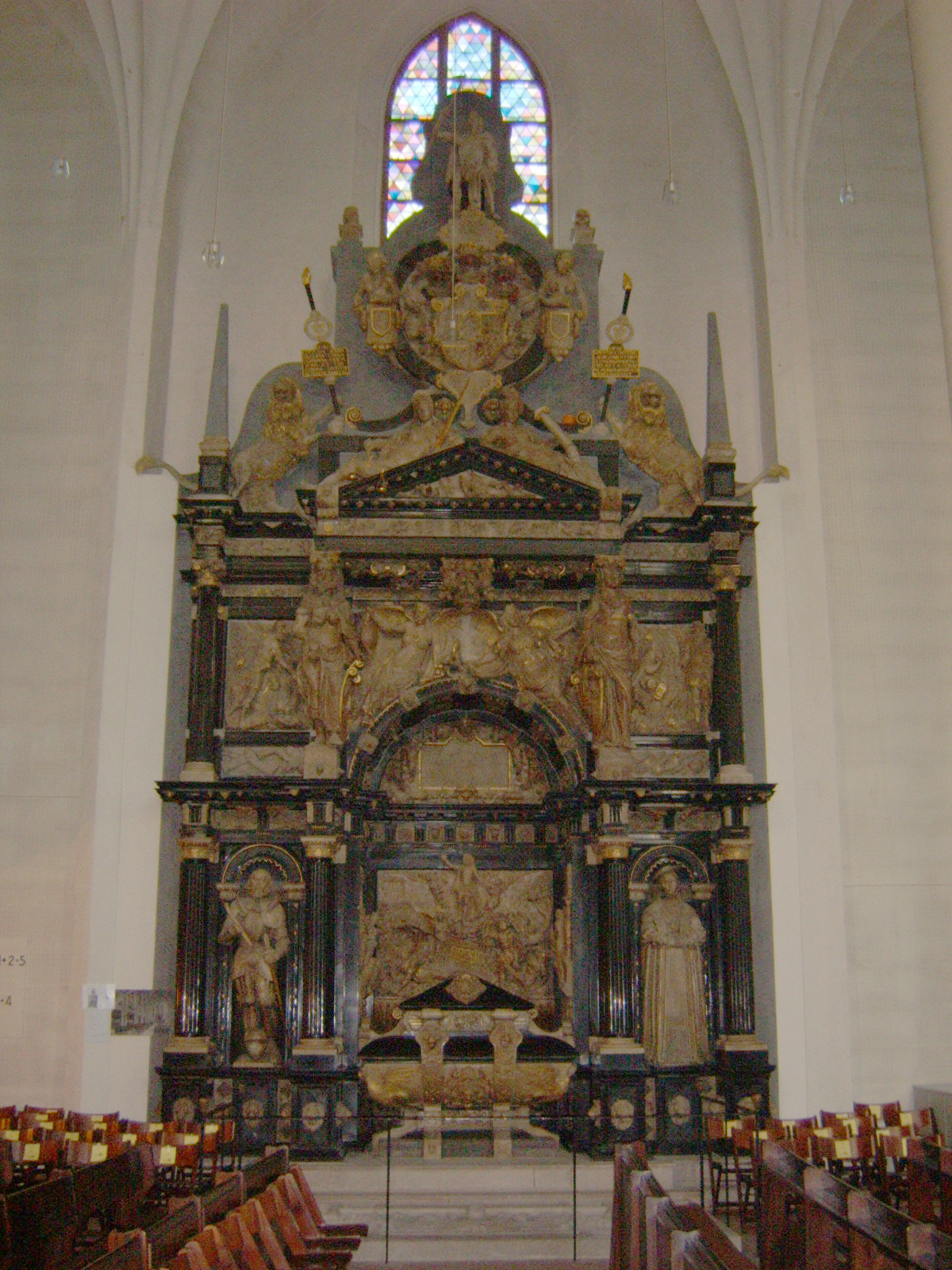
Epitaph of Landgraf Philip inside the church

== Organ ==
In September 1732, J.S. Bach & his wife went to Kassel to inspect the renovated organ at the Martinskirche. A contemporary organ, with a.o. a quarter tone manual, was installed in 2017 built by Rieger Organbau.

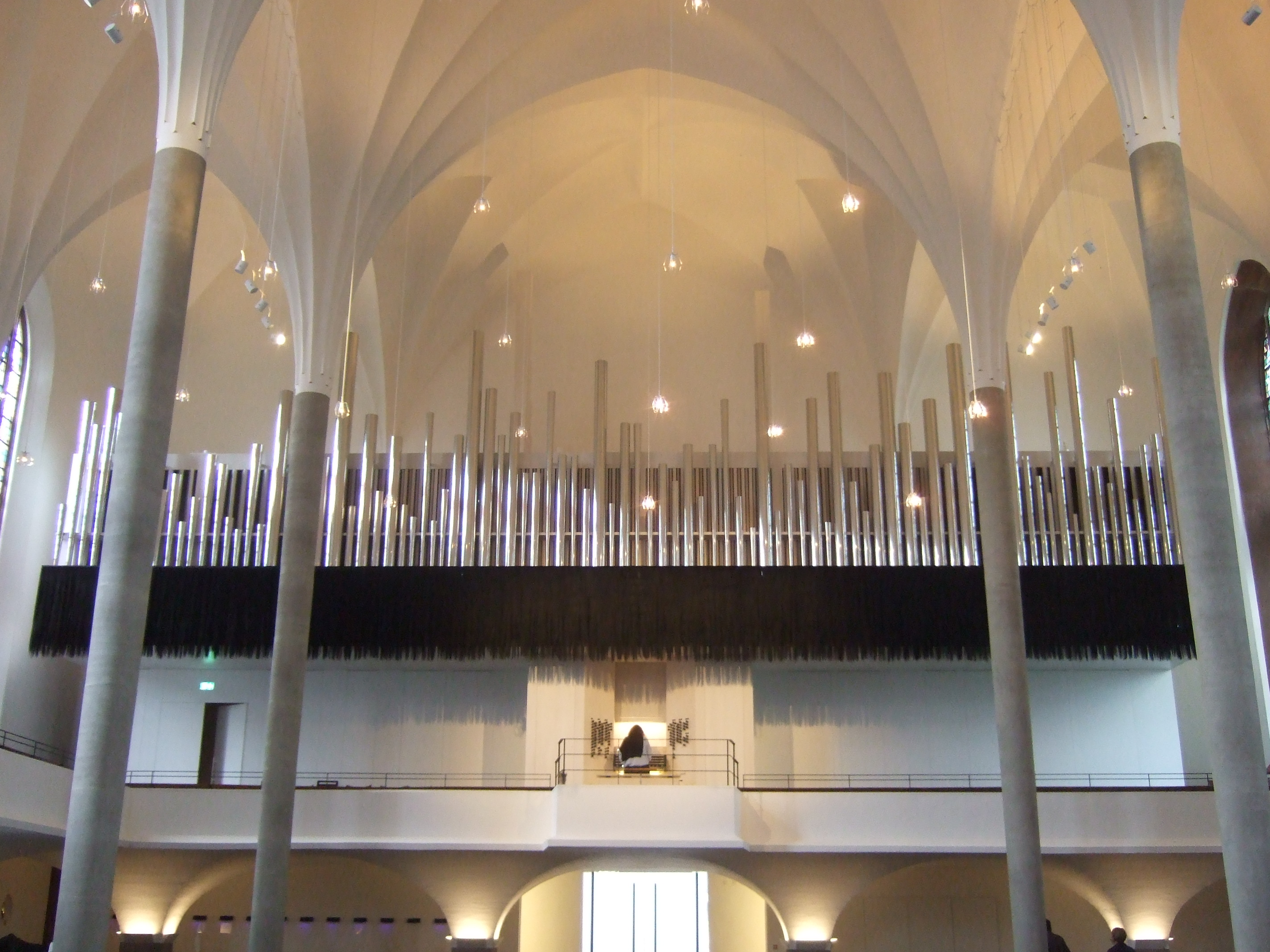
Organ of the Martinskirche in 2017

== Bibliography ==
- Alois Holtmeyer: Die Bau- und Kulturdenkmäler im Kreis Cassel-Stadt. Verlag Elwert, Marburg 1923 (Die Bau- und Kunstdenkmäler im Regierungsbezirk Kassel; Bd. 6).
- Peter Horst: Die Martinskirche in Kassel (Große Baudenkmäler, Heft 212). 2. Auflage, München/Berlin 1977
- Franz T. Piderit: Geschichte der Haupt- und Residenzstadt Kassel. Historische Edition Carl, Vellmar 2004, ISBN 3-9807814-3-7 (Nachdr. d. Ausg. Kassel 1882).
- Christian Presche: Die fürstlichen Grabstätten in der Kasseler Martinskirche. In: Zeitschrift des Vereins für hessische Geschichte und Landeskunde (ZHG), Bd. 107 (2002), ISSN 0342-3107.
