= Wer mich liebet, der wird mein Wort halten, BWV 74 =

Church cantata by Johann Sebastian Bach

Wer mich liebet, der wird mein Wort halten
- BWV 74
- Church cantata by J. S. Bach
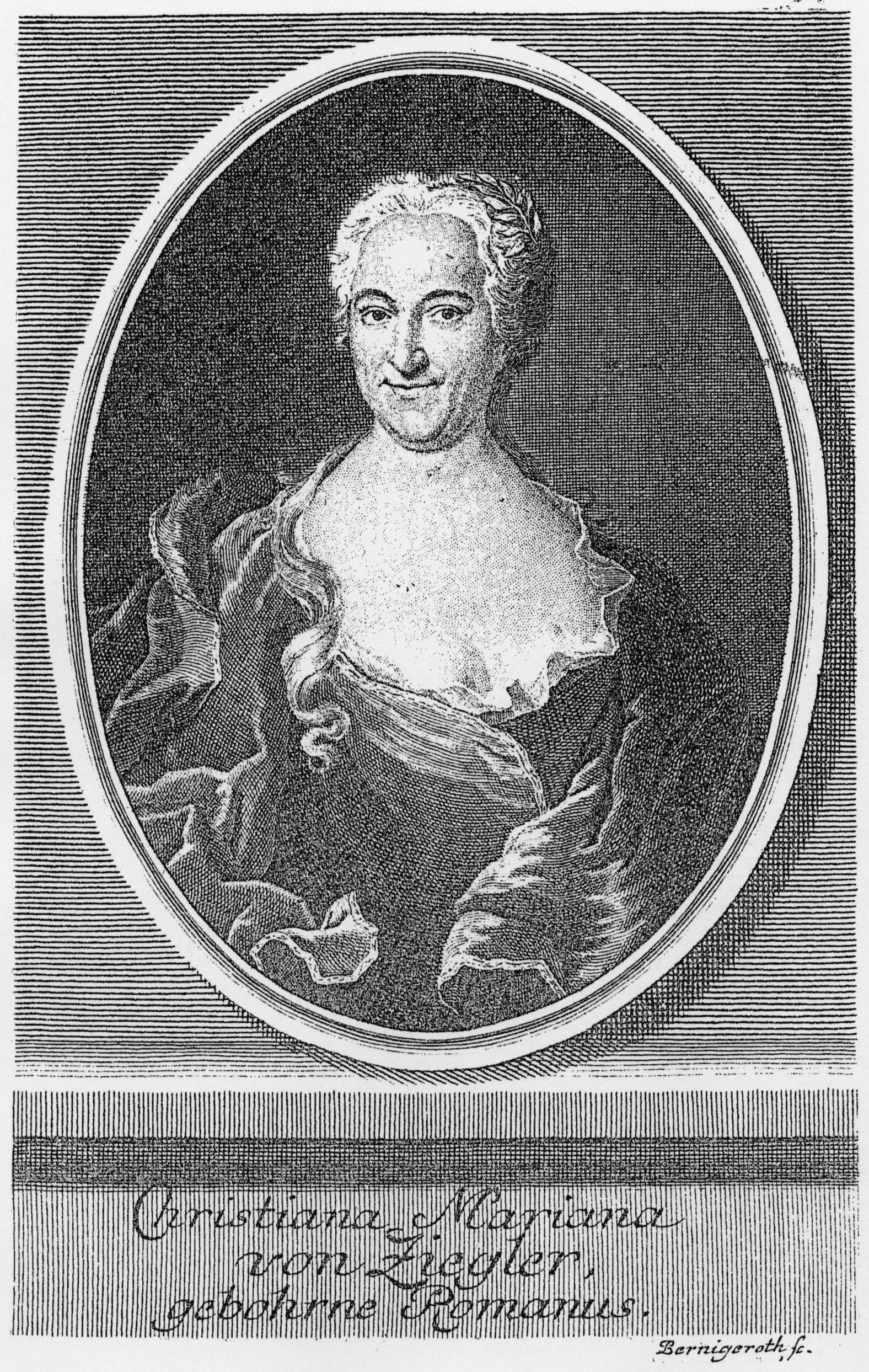
- Christiana Mariana von Ziegler, author of the cantata text
- Occasion: Pentecost
- Chorale: "Gott Vater, sende deinen Geist"
- Performed: 20 May 1725?: Leipzig
- Movements: 8
- Vocal: SATB choir and solo
- Instrumental: 3 trumpets; timpani; 2 oboes; oboe da caccia; 2 violins; viola; continuo

Wer mich liebet, der wird mein Wort halten ("If a man love me, he will keep my words", more literally: "He who loves me will obey my commands"), BWV 74, (Note: "BWV" is Bach-Werke-Verzeichnis, a thematic catalogue of Bach's works.) is a church cantata by Johann Sebastian Bach. He composed it in Leipzig for Pentecost and first performed it on 20 May 1725.

It is the sixth of nine cantatas on texts by Christiana Mariana von Ziegler, with whom Bach collaborated at the end of his second cantata cycle. It begins with a choral movement, a reworking of one on the same text that Bach had composed for Pentecost 1723. For a closing chorale she used the second stanza from Paul Gerhardt's hymn "Gott Vater, sende deinen Geist". She quoted the Bible three times, from the Gospel twice and one from the epistle. Much of her text was based on the Gospel of John. Bach scored the cantata for four vocal soloists (soprano, alto, tenor and bass), a four-part choir and a Baroque instrumental ensemble of three trumpets, timpani, two oboes, an oboe da caccia, strings and basso continuo.

== History and text ==
Bach composed this cantata in his second year in Leipzig for the first day of Pentecost (Whit Sunday). The prescribed readings for the feast day were from the Acts of the Apostles (Acts 2:1–13) and the Gospel of John, part of the Farewell Discourse (John 14:23–31).

The librettist for this work was Christiana Mariana von Ziegler. She collaborated with Bach on nine cantatas after Easter 1724, beginning with Ihr werdet weinen und heulen, BWV 103, this being the sixth of them. In most of these works, she began with a quotation of Jesus from the Gospel. For this cantata, she quoted the Bible three times, taking a quotation from the Gospel as a starting point in movement 1 (verse 23), another one in movement 4 (verse 28), and a quotation from an epistle by Paul in movement 6 (Romans 8:1). She concluded the text with the second stanza from Paul Gerhardt's hymn "Gott Vater, sende deinen Geist". She based much of her text on the "metaphysical" readings of the Gospel of John.

Bach led the Thomanerchor in the first performance on 20 May 1725.

== Scoring and structure ==
This piece is scored for four solo voices (soprano, alto, tenor, and bass), a four-part choir, three trumpets, timpani, two oboes, an oboe da caccia, two violins, viola, and basso continuo.

The cantata has eight movements:

1. Chorus: Wer mich liebet, der wird mein Wort halten
2. Aria (soprano): Komm, komm, mein Herze steht dir offen
3. Recitative (alto): Die Wohnung ist bereit
4. Aria (bass): Ich gehe hin und komme wieder zu euch
5. Aria (tenor): Kommt, eilet, stimmet Sait und Lieder
6. Recitative (bass): Es ist nichts Verdammliches an denen
7. Aria (alto): Nichts kann mich erretten
8. Chorale: Kein Menschenkind hier auf der Erd

== Music ==
The opening chorus of this cantata is shorter than average and is a substantial reworking of the opening chorus from Wer mich liebet, der wird mein Wort halten, BWV 59, composed two years earlier and performed again the previous year. It employs a ritornello theme followed by a fanfare-like choral entry. The original movement was a two-part vocal entry; the expansion relies on imitative pairings, reflecting the earlier texture. Craig Smith suggests that this is one of Bach's most successful arrangements of his own work because it remakes the "patchy" and "hollow" duet into "something richly varied and exquisitely delicate". The movement is in C major and common time.

The second movement is a soprano aria with oboe da caccia, a transposition of the bass and violin pairing of BWV 59. The new arrangement lends a "childlike openness" to the movement. It is in F major and common time.

The third movement is a short alto recitative of only seven measures. It is characterized by the diminished chord which concludes the vocal line before the final cadence.

The bass aria uses "sequences of 'treading' quavers in the continuo line" to suggest a stepping motion. The movement concludes with a long vocal melisma. The movement is in E minor.

The piece then moves into a technically demanding tenor aria dominated by swirling string lines. The movement is in a combined ternary and ritornello form, adopting a heavy emphasis on the words komm and eilet ("come" and "hasten"), and concludes with a modulation to a minor key and darker harmonies.

The bass recitative, like the earlier alto, is rather short and simple in comparison to the arias. It employs an unusual accompaniment of three oboes. The recitative modulates from E minor to C major.

The seventh movement, an alto aria, has unusually dense texture and rich scoring. It opens with a fanfare-like ritornello followed by long melismatic passages with repeated notes in the instrumental parts. The short middle section moves to a less dense accompaniment and a minor key, with a "manic chortling" of triplets on the word lache ("laugh").

The closing chorale is a four-part setting of the melody of "Kommt her zu mir, spricht Gottes Sohn". It is in a minor key, creating a sombre mood.

== Recordings ==
- Ton Koopman, Amsterdam Baroque Orchestra & Choir, Bogna Bartosz, Christoph Prégardien, Klaus Mertens, J. S. Bach: Complete Cantatas Vol. 14, Antoine Marchand 2001
- Gächinger Kantorei / Bach-Collegium Stuttgart. Die Bach Kantate. Hänssler, 1972.
- Monteverdi Choir / English Baroque Soloists. J. S. Bach: Whitsun Cantatas. Archiv Produktion, 1999.
- Nederlands Vocaal Ensemble / Deutsche Bachsolisten. Bach: 13 Sacred Cantatas & 13 Sinfonias. Philips, 1972.
