= Budapest Spring Festival =

Arts festival in Budapest, Hungary

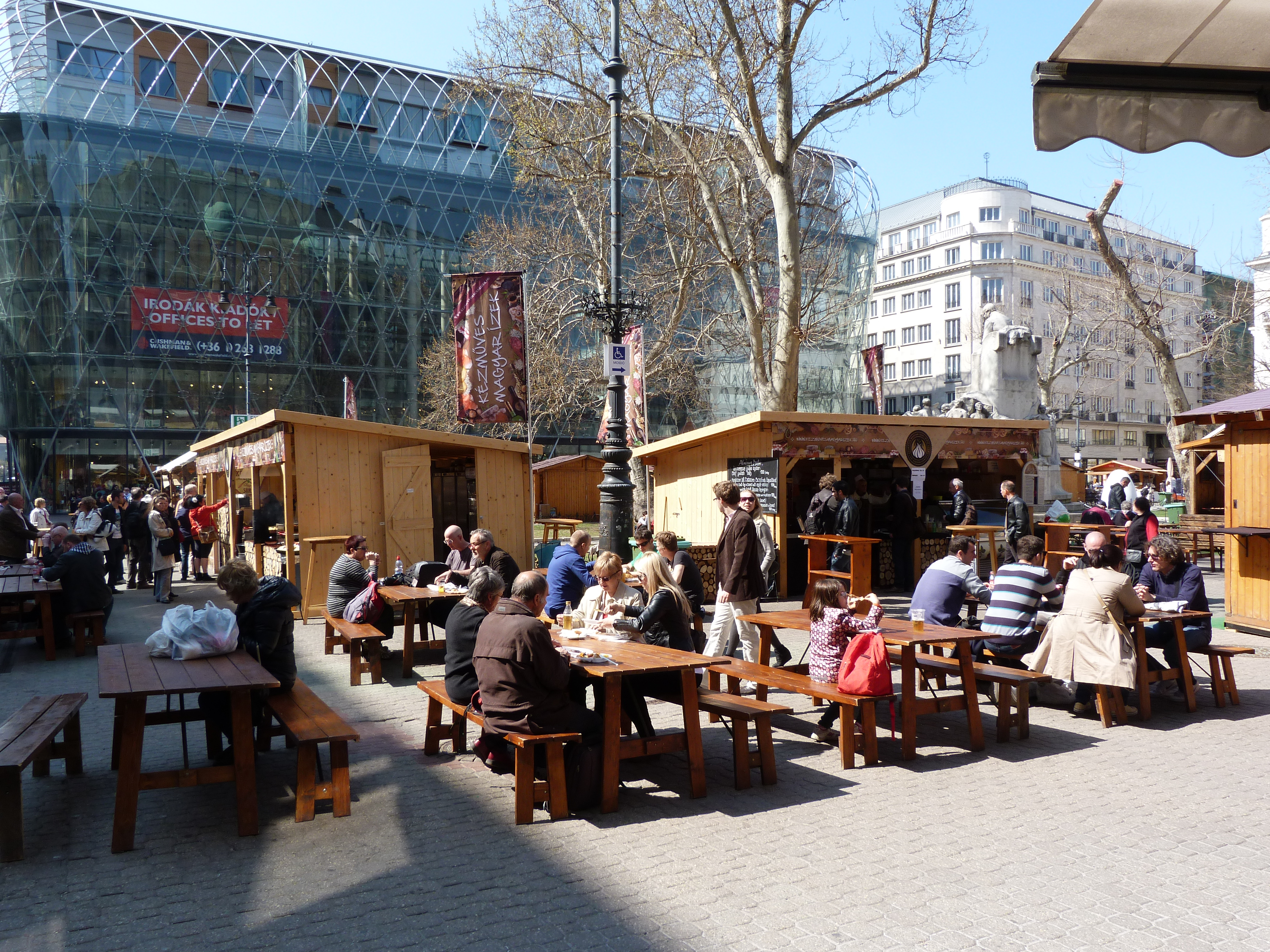
Festival at the Vörösmarty Square

Budapest Spring Festival (Hungarian: Budapesti Tavaszi Fesztivál, pronounced [ˈbudɒpɛʃti ˈtɒvɒsi ˈfɛstivaːl]) is the major arts festival of Budapest, Hungary, sponsored by the city government.

The festival is focused on classical music and is larger than its sister event the Budapest Autumn Festival, which is primarily for modern and avant-garde performances.
