= Panajotis Iconomou =

German bass-baritone of Greek parentage (born 1971)

Panajotis Iconomou (born May 22, 1971 in Munich) is a German bass-baritone of Greek parentage.

Iconomou was born in Munich. He joined the Tölzer Knabenchor in 1980 and toured Europe as a boy. He made notable appearances in 1985 at the Salzburger Festspiele with Hans Graf, J.S. Bach's St John Passion and St Matthew Passion with Nikolaus Harnoncourt and the Concentus Musicus Wien at the styriarte Bach Festival in Graz, and the same program with Peter Schreier and Kurt Moll at the Stuttgart Bach Festival the same year. He was a boy soloist in several recordings in the series of the Complete Cantatas by Johann Sebastian Bach, conducted by Harnoncourt.

After his voice broke in 1986, he became a bass and became noted in the 1990s for his Bach and Mozart recitals. He joined the National Opera Studio of London in 1997. In 2001 he represented Greece at the Cardiff Singer of the World competition.
