= Ursula Buckel =

German soprano

- Born: 11 February 1926; Lauscha
- Died: 5 December 2005 (aged 79); Geneva
- Occupations: Classical soprano; Academic voice teacher
- Organization: Conservatoire de Musique de Genève

Ursula Buckel (11 February 1926 – 5 December 2005) was a German soprano singer, known for singing works of Johann Sebastian Bach.

== Career ==
Born in the Thuringian town of Lauscha, Ursula Buckel studied singing in the School of Church Music in Braunschweig in 1947; later she undertook further study with Hans Höfflin in Freiburg and with Ria Ginster in Zürich and in Hilversum.

She collaborated regularly with the Zurich Bach Choir, Karl Richter and his Münchener Bach-Chor, Diethard Hellmann and his Mainzer Bach-Chor, and Karl Ristenpart. With Richter she was a frequent soloist for recordings of Bach cantatas, including in 1961 Herz und Mund und Tat und Leben, BWV 147, a cantata that Bach had written in 1723 for the feast of the Visitation always celebrated on 2 July. Performances of Bach's Mass in B minor and St John Passion with Richter and soloists Hertha Töpper, Ernst Haefliger and Peter van der Bilt in the Grand Hall of the Moscow Conservatory in 1968 were recorded live. She recorded Bach's St Matthew Passion with Richter, a live performance in 1969 at Bunka-Kaykan, Tokyo and also conducted by Eric Ericson, with John van Kesteren as the Evangelist.

In 1958 she sang in Basel in the premiere of Gilgamesch-Epos by Bohuslav Martinů. Five years later, she recorded Frank Martin's oratorio for soloists, choruses & orchestra In Terra Pax, written in 1944, with Ernest Ansermet conducting the Orchestre de la Suisse Romande. In 1963 she also recorded the title role of Monteverdi's opera L'incoronazione di Poppea with conductor Rudolf Ewerhart, although she did not perform the opera on stage. Her only appearance on the opera stage was in 1970 as Donna Anna in Mozart's Don Giovanni.

In 1969 she sang in Ein deutsches Requiem of Brahms with Jakob Stämpfli and the Frauenfelder Oratorienchor. With the choir Philharmonischer Chor Schwäbisch Gmünd she performed Haydn's Die Schöpfung (The Creation) in 1971 with Kurt Huber and Roland Hermann.

Since 1971 she was a teacher of voice at the Conservatoire de Musique de Genève. She also conducted master classes. She died in Geneva in 2005.
