= Wie schön leuchtet der Morgenstern, BWV 1 discography =

Recordings of Bach's 1725 chorale cantata

Bach composed Wie schön leuchtet der Morgenstern, BWV 1, as chorale cantata for the Marian feast of the Annunciation, for a first performance in a church service in Leipzig on 25 March 1725. The cantata, for soprano, tenor and bass soloists, four-part choir and Baroque orchestra, takes around 25 minutes to perform.

== Recordings ==
The conductor Fritz Lehmann recorded nine Bach cantatas with the Berliner Motettenchor and the Berliner Philharmoniker for Deutsche Grammophon. Recordings of nine cantatas were made between 1950 and 1952, and Wie schön leuchtet der Morgenstern was the first one to be released, in 1952. Lehmann died in 1956, preventing an expansion of the project. The nine cantatas were reissued by Eloquence Classics in 2018. Fritz Werner recorded around 50 of Bach's church cantatas with the Heinrich-Schütz-Chor Heilbronn and the Pforzheim Chamber Orchestra between 1959 and 1974, recording Wie schön leuchtet der Morgenstern in 1965. Several of them were reissued in 2004. A reviewer of the first volume noted: "Fritz Werner has this music in his blood. His instincts for Bach style are generally sound and he directs the music with a profound belief in it. These are performances of quiet conviction."

In 1971, Wie schön leuchtet der Morgenstern was the first cantata for the project to record all church cantatas by Bach on period instruments in historically informed performances for what is now known as the Teldec series (it began on the Telefunken label); the conductor was Nikolaus Harnoncourt, who was one of two conductors on the project, the other being Gustav Leonhardt. While some instruments such as baroque violins were relatively easily available, other instruments necessary for historically informed performance posed more challenges, for example, the oboe da caccia which is specified in the score of this cantata. A reconstructed version of this instrument was available by 1973, when the revival of the instrument had benefited from scholarly research at the beginning of the 1970s. However, it is not clear what would have been available for Jürg Schäftlein and Karl Gruber, the oboists of Harnoncourt's instrumental ensemble Concentus Musicus Wien, when BWV 1 was recorded. Another aspect of historically informed performance is the use of all male singers (which was the norm for Bach in Leipzig). Harnoncourt conducted the first four cantatas with the Wiener Sängerknaben, with a soprano soloist from the boys' choir and a countertenor for the alto part.

Helmuth Rilling, who began a recording of all Bach cantatas in 1969 and completed it in 1985, recorded Wie schön leuchtet der Morgenstern in 1980, with the Gächinger Kantorei and Bach-Collegium Stuttgart. Thomaskantor Hans-Joachim Rotzsch, recorded Bach cantatas with the Thomanerchor and the Neues Bachisches Collegium Musicum. They recorded Wie schön leuchtet der Morgenstern, coupled with Bach's chorale cantata on a hymn by Nicolai, Wachet auf, ruft uns die Stimme, BWV 140, in 1987. Pieter Jan Leusink conducted all Bach church cantatas with the Holland Boys Choir and the Netherlands Bach Collegium in historically informed performance, however with women for the solo soprano parts. He completed the project within a year on the occasion of the Bach Year 2000. A reviewer from Gramophone noted: "Leusink's success elsewhere comes largely through his admirably well-judged feeling for tempos and a means of accentuation which drives the music forward inexorably".

Masaaki Suzuki, who studied historically informed practice in Europe began recording Bach's church cantatas with the Bach Collegium Japan in 1999, at first not aiming at a complete cycle, but completing all in 2017. They released Wie schön leuchtet der Morgenstern in 2007. Sigiswald Kuijken recorded a series of cantatas with the ensemble La Petite Bande with vocalists singing one voice per part (OVPP). They recorded Wie schön leuchtet der Morgenstern in 2007. The Swiss J. S. Bach-Stiftung plans to cover all church cantata by Bach in recorded live concerts with introductions. They covered Wie schön leuchtet der Morgenstern in 2010. In 2013, a CD was released sung by the Thomanerchor with the Gewandhausorchester, conducted by Georg Christoph Biller. As part 9 of their series Das Kirchenjahr mit Johann Sebastian Bach (The church year with J. S. Bach), titled Marian Feasts, they performed Cantata 125 for Purification, Cantata 1 for Annunciation, and Cantata 147 for Visitation.

Recordings of Wie schön leuchtet der Morgenstern
Title	Conductor / Choir / Orchestra	Soloists	Label	Year
J. S. Bach: Cantatas BWV 1	Fritz Lehmann Berliner Motettenchor Berliner Philharmoniker	Gunthild Weber; Helmut Krebs; Hermann Schey	Deutsche Grammophon; OCLC 64384066	1952
Les Grandes Cantates de J. S. Bach Vol. 1	Fritz Werner Heinrich-Schütz-Chor Heilbronn Pforzheim Chamber Orchestra	Maria Friesenhausen; Helmut Krebs; Barry McDaniel	Erato; OCLC 1078110812	1965
Bach Cantatas Vol. 2 – Easter	Karl Richter Münchener Bach-Chor Münchener Bach-Orchester	Edith Mathis; Ernst Haefliger; Dietrich Fischer-Dieskau	Archiv Produktion; OCLC 7023395	1968
J. S. Bach: Das Kantatenwerk • Complete Cantatas • Les Cantates, Folge / Vol. 1	Nikolaus Harnoncourt: Wiener Sängerknaben; Chorus Viennensis; Concentus Musicus Wien	Soloist of the Wiener Sängerknaben; Kurt Equiluz; Max van Egmond	Teldec; OCLC 624441832	1971
Die Bach Kantate Vol. 38	Helmuth Rilling Gächinger Kantorei Bach-Collegium Stuttgart	Inga Nielsen; Adalbert Kraus; Philippe Huttenlocher	Hänssler; OCLC 673097273	1980
Bach Made in Germany Vol. 4 – Cantatas II	Hans-Joachim Rotzsch Thomanerchor Neues Bachisches Collegium Musicum	Arleen Augér; Peter Schreier; Siegfried Lorenz	Eterna; OCLC 32373438	c. 1987
Bach Cantatas Vol. 21: Cambridge/Walpole St Peter	John Eliot Gardiner Monteverdi Choir English Baroque Soloists	Malin Hartelius; James Gilchrist; Peter Harvey	Soli Deo Gloria; OCLC 68812471	2000
Bach Edition Vol. 18 – Cantatas Vol. 9	Pieter Jan Leusink Holland Boys Choir Netherlands Bach Collegium	Marjon Strijk; Knut Schoch; Bas Ramselaar	Brilliant Classics; OCLC 872058181	2000
J. S. Bach: Complete Cantatas Vol. 13	Ton Koopman Amsterdam Baroque Orchestra & Choir	Deborah York; Paul Agnew; Klaus Mertens	Antoine Marchand; OCLC 811333583	2000
J. S. Bach: Cantatas Vol. 34 (Cantatas from Leipzig 1725)	Masaaki Suzuki Bach Collegium Japan	Carolyn Sampson; Gerd Türk; Peter Kooy	BIS; OCLC 811226000	2007
Bach: Cantates Marie de Nazareth	Eric Milnes Montréal Baroque	Monika Mauch; Matthew White; Charles Daniels; Stephan MacLeod	ATMA Classique; OCLC 156910016	2006
J. S. Bach: Cantatas for the Complete Liturgical Year Vol. 6 (Sexagesima and Estomihi Sundays)	Sigiswald Kuijken La Petite Bande	Siri Thornhill; Petra Noskaiová; Marcus Ullmann; Jan van der Crabben	Accent; OCLC 936410457	2007
J. S. Bach: Kantate BWV 1 "Wie schön leuchtet der Morgenstern"	Rudolf Lutz Chor der J. S. Bach-Stiftung Orchester der J. S. Bach-Stiftung	Eva Oltiványi; Makoto Sakurada; Manuel Walser	Gallus Media; OCLC 918598096	2010
Bach: Wie schön leuchtet der Morgenstern – Cantata BWV 1, 48, 78 & 140	Karl-Friedrich Beringer Windsbacher Knabenchor Deutsche Kammer-Virtuosen Berlin	Sibylla Rubens; Markus Schäfer; Klaus Mertens	Sony Music; OCLC 953527912	2011
Kantaten · Cantatas / 1, 125, 147	Georg Christoph Biller Thomanerchor Gewandhausorchester	Paul Bernewitz; Christoph Genz; Gotthold Schwarz	Rondeau	2013
