= Brich dem Hungrigen dein Brot, BWV 39 =

1726 church cantata by J. S. Bach

Brich dem Hungrigen dein Brot
- BWV 39
- Church cantata by J. S. Bach
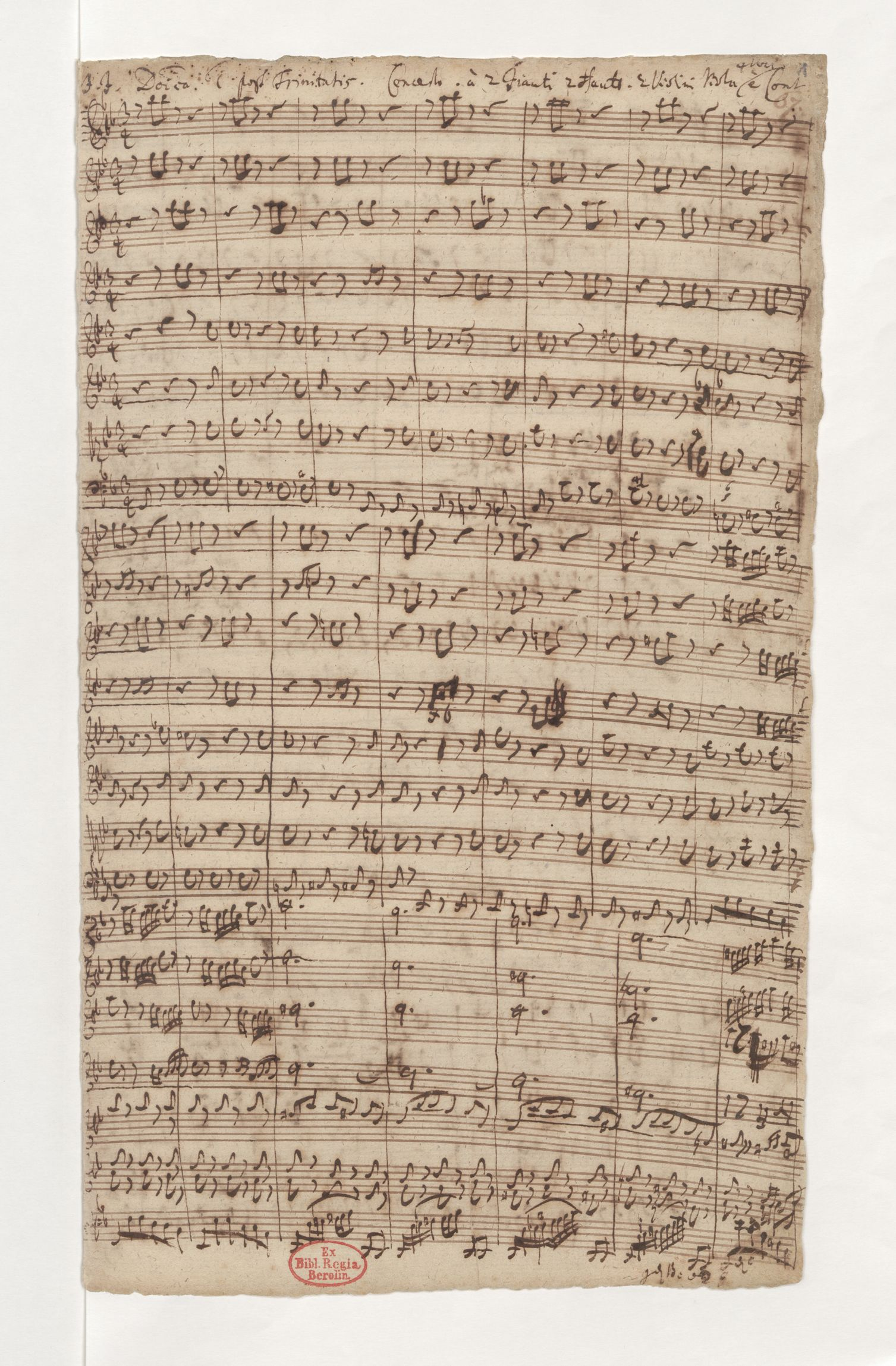
- Opening orchestral Sinfonia from Bach's autograph score
- English: Break with hungry men thy bread
- Occasion: First Sunday after Trinity
- Bible text: Isaiah 58:7–8; Hebrews 13:16
- Chorale: by David Denicke
- Performed: 23 June 1726: Leipzig
- Movements: 7 in two parts (3 + 4)
- Vocal: SATB choir; Solo: soprano, alto and bass
- Instrumental: 2 recorders; 2 oboes; 2 violins; viola; continuo

Johann Sebastian Bach composed the church cantata Brich dem Hungrigen dein Brot ("Break with the hungry thy bread" or "Give the hungry thy bread" (Note: These two metrical translations are taken from recent published vocal scores: the first from a Bärenreiter Urtext edition; the second from a Carus-Verlag Urtext edition.)), BWV 39, in Leipzig in 1726 for the first Sunday after Trinity, which fell on 23 June that year. Three years earlier, on the Sunday after Trinity in 1723, Bach had taken office as Thomaskantor and started his first cycle of cantatas for Sundays and Feast Days in the liturgical year. On the Sunday after Trinity in 1724, he began his second cycle, consisting of chorale cantatas. Brich dem Hungrigen dein Brot is regarded as part of Bach's third cantata cycle which was written sporadically between 1725 and 1727. He marked the occasion by an ambitious work with an exceptionally masterful opening chorus.

The text of the cantata is taken from a 1704 collection of librettos from Meiningen, many of which had been set to music in cantatas of Bach's distant cousin Johann Ludwig Bach, Kapellmeister at Meiningen. The librettos have been attributed to his employer Duke Ernst Ludwig von Sachsen-Meiningen. The symmetrical structure of seven movements is typical for this collection: the opening quotation from the Old Testament, followed by a recitative and an aria; then the central quotation from the New Testament, followed by an aria and a recitative, leading into the final chorale. The theme of BWV 39 is an invocation to be grateful for God's gifts and to share them with the needy.

Bach set the opening Old Testament passage as a large scale complex movement for four-part chorus and full orchestra in three sections, one for each sentence in the biblical quotation. By contrast he set the central New Testament passage beginning the second part as a bass solo accompanied by a single obbligato cello, the bass voice representing the traditional voice of Jesus. The cantata is scored for three groups of instruments—alto recorders, oboes and strings—from which the four obbligato soloists are drawn that accompany the two arias, for alto and soprano.

== Composition history ==
=== Background ===
Bach composed the cantata for the First Sunday after Trinity on 23 June 1726. This dating of the autograph manuscript was only determined late by authorities on Bach, particularly Alfred Dürr, Christoph Wolff and Klaus Hofmann who were involved in preparing Urtext editions for the Neue Bach-Ausgabe and establishing the Bach Archive in Leipzig. The circumstances surrounding the composition were clarified by other Bach scholars, notably William H. Scheide and Konrad Küster. Before the dating was known, several commentators had given 1732 as the date of composition, dubbing it the "Refugee Cantata", supposedly composed in response to the arrival of Protestants banished from Salzburg; it is unknown whether there was a repeat performance of the cantata to commemorate that event. The scholar Whittaker left a typed draft of a chronology of Bach's cantatas when he died, which appeared in a corrected appendix to the paperback reprint of 1978. In his foreword to a 1999 critical edition, Ulrich Leisinger points out that Leipzig had to avoid conflict with the Catholic court in Dresden and probably just granted humanitarian aid to the Protestants in transit.

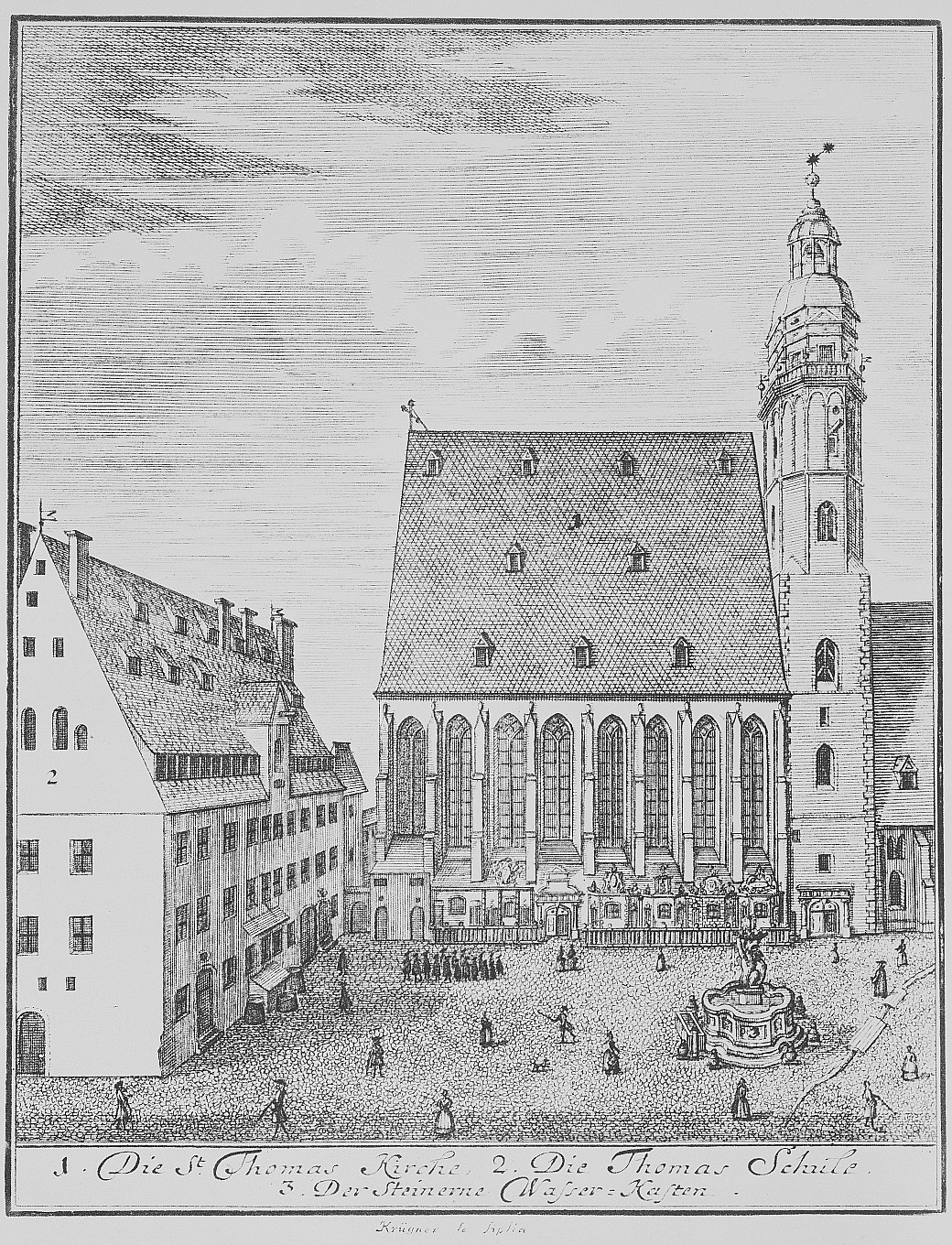
Engraving of the Thomaskirche and Thomasschule in Leipzig in 1723, when Bach was appointed Thomaskantor

The first Sunday after Trinity marks the beginning of the second half of the liturgical year, "in which core issues of faith and doctrine are explored". The order of service used in Leipzig at Bach's time called for an extended cantata in two parts for the occasion. It also had particular significance for Bach since it was on that day in 1723 that he assumed office as Thomaskantor in Leipzig. His duties there included the education of the Thomanerchor and performances in the regular services in four churches in Leipzig, including the main churches Thomaskirche and the Nikolaikirche. The most skilled church musicians—including SATB soloists and others doubling as choristers and instrumentalists—were based at the Thomaskirche where cantatas were performed each Sunday and on feast days. The other instrumentalists were either professional string players (Kunstgeiger), members of the Leipzig Stadtpfeifer, an ancient band of brass and wind players, or travelling musicians. Remaining gaps in the orchestra were filled by pupils from the Thomasschule and university students. Bach's orchestra would have had 12-20 players in addition to himself and an organist. In the Thomaskirche, the musicians performed from two galleries above and around the principal organ loft in the centre. Sometimes two cantatas would be performed during a service; and when a cantata was written in two parts, a sermon would be preached between the two parts or the second part would accompany communion. As Thomaskantor, Bach instituted several changes in performance practise in Leipzig: he introduced more frequent and regular rehearsals for choristers, including individual lessons; he installed former students as organists and directors of music in the churches for which he was responsible; and—going beyond his church duties—he helped select and train municipal musicians.

=== Cantata cycles ===
On his appointment Bach embarked on the project of composing yearly cycles of cantatas with one for each Sunday and holiday of the liturgical year, a project which Wolff describes as "an artistic undertaking on the largest scale". The cantata he wrote Sunday after Trinity in 1723 was Die Elenden sollen essen, BWV 75, beginning the first cantata cycle; the cantata O Ewigkeit, du Donnerwort, BWV 20, from 1724 began the second cycle, again on the Sunday after Trinity. With BWV 20, Bach entered on a new scheme for the second cycle: to compose chorale cantatas based exclusively on the main Lutheran hymns associated with the occasions in the liturgical calendar.

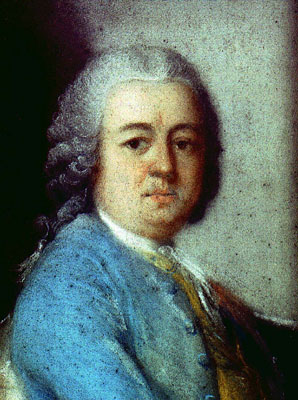
Johann Ludwig Bach

After completing his second cycle, Bach's third cycle was composed sporadically between 1725 and 1727. Moreover, Bach does not seem to have marked the anniversary of his appointment in 1725. From February 1726 up to late September that year, the cantatas performed in Leipzig were mostly those by Bach's distant cousin Johann Ludwig Bach, court composer at Meiningen. Johann Ludwig Bach set texts from the court at Meiningen published in 1704, twenty of them in 2013, according to Salomon Kümmerle's 1888 Encyclopädie der evangelischen Kirchenmusik. Bach copied and performed at least 18 of those, and he used texts from Meiningen for seven of the only nine cantatas that he newly composed during this period. He may have encountered gaps in his cousin's series, or he may have felt that the extant settings did not meet his expectations; the latter reason seems supported by at least one cantata text, Siehe, ich will viel Fischer aussenden, being composed by both. Bach's first cantata based on a Meiningen text was Gott fähret auf mit Jauchzen, BWV 43, for the Feast of the Ascension on 30 May 1726, followed by BWV 39, BWV 88, BWV 187, BWV 45, BWV 102 and BWV 17. They set texts in the formal scheme of his cousin. On 23 June 1726, Bach revived the tradition of a beginning on the Sunday after Trinity by performing Brich dem Hungrigen dein Brot for the beginning of his fourth year in office; it was the first "Meiningen" cantata written for a Sunday.

=== Readings and text ===
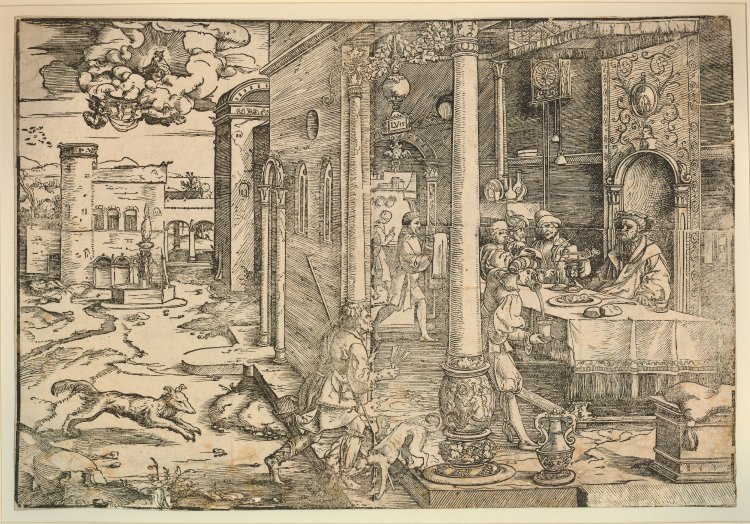
Parable of the Rich man and Lazarus, 16C Netherlandish woodcut, Jan Swart van Groningen

The prescribed readings for the Sunday were from the First Epistle of John, (the "God is Love" verses, 1 John 4:16–21), and from the Gospel of Luke (the parable of the Rich man and Lazarus, Luke 16:19–31). Bach's first cantata for the occasion, Die Elenden sollen essen, BWV 75 (1723), had concentrated on the contrast between the rich and the poor; and the second, the chorale cantata O Ewigkeit, du Donnerwort, BWV 20 (1724), concerned repentance when faced with death and eternity. In contrast the libretto of Brich dem Hungrigen dein Brot took as its theme gratitude for God's gifts and the duty to share them with the needy.

The libretto used by Bach for BWV 39 comes from the 1704 collection for Meiningen, entitled Sonntags- und Fest-Andachten; these religious texts have been attributed to Ernst Ludwig I, Duke of Saxe-Meiningen, Johann Ludwig Bach's employer. They were set by both Bach and his cousin.

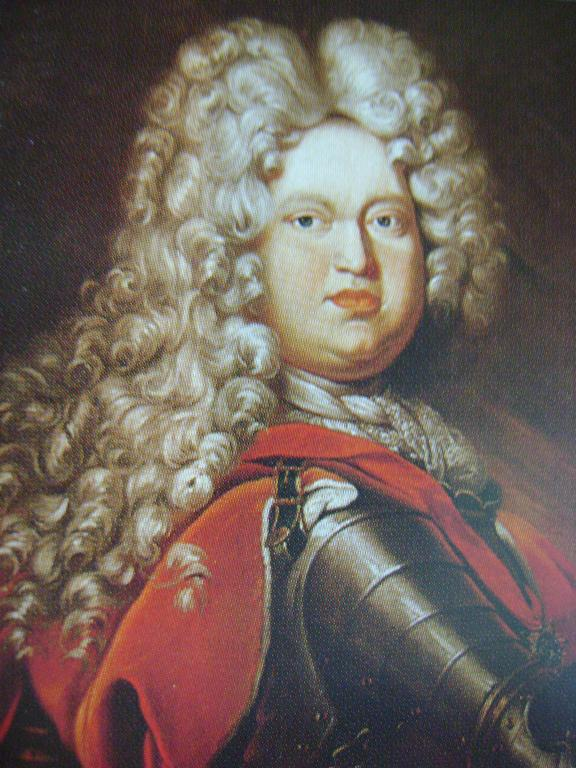
Ernst Ludwig I, possibly the librettist

All the Meiningen cantatas of Johann Ludwig Bach, performed in Leipzig between February and September 1726, had librettos from this collection. They all have a uniform structure in seven verse sections: each cantata starts with a passage from the Old Testament; followed by a recitative on a long verse text; an aria; a central passage from the New Testament; a second aria; a second recitative, often with more than two sentences so that it can end with a chorus; and a final chorale, sometimes with two stanzas. The Old Testament and New Testament passages usually have a common theme, with the former often prefiguring the coming of Christ. Bach departed from his cousin's model in two ways. Firstly he divided the libretto into two parts that framed the church sermon: Bach usually started Part II with the central New Testament passage; only in the case of BWV 102 did he place it at the conclusion of Part I. Secondly Bach took the sixth verse section of the libretto, written in archaic alexandrines, wholly as a recitative leading into the final chorale.

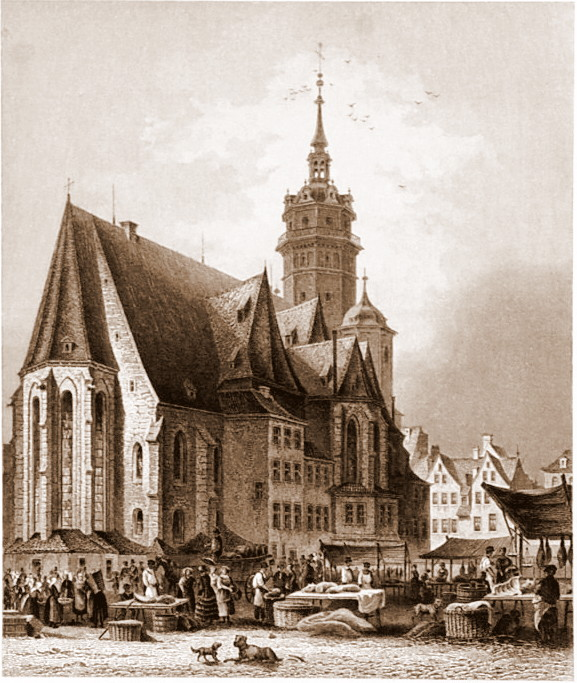
Nikolaikirche, place of the first performance

In the libretto of BWV 39, the Old Testament passage is taken from the Book of Isaiah (Isaiah 58:7–8) and the New Testament passage from the Epistle to the Hebrews (Hebrews 13:16). Both passages have as common themes the invocations to love thy neighbour and to share God's gifts. The final section of the libretto is the sixth stanza of David Denicke's 1648 hymn "Kommt, laßt euch den Herren lehren", which involves the same themes. This hymn was sung to the same melody as "Freu dich sehr, o meine Seele". The melody was first published by Louis Bourgeois as Psalm 42 in his collection of Psaumes octante trios de David (Geneva, 1551). The psalm melody itself was probably derived from the secular song "Ne l'oseray je dire" in the Manuscrit de Bayeux published around 1510.

=== First performance ===
Bach led the Thomanerchor in the first performance at the Nikolaikirche on 23 June 1726; Friedrich Wilhelm Schütz held the sermon.

== Music ==
=== Instrumentation and structure ===
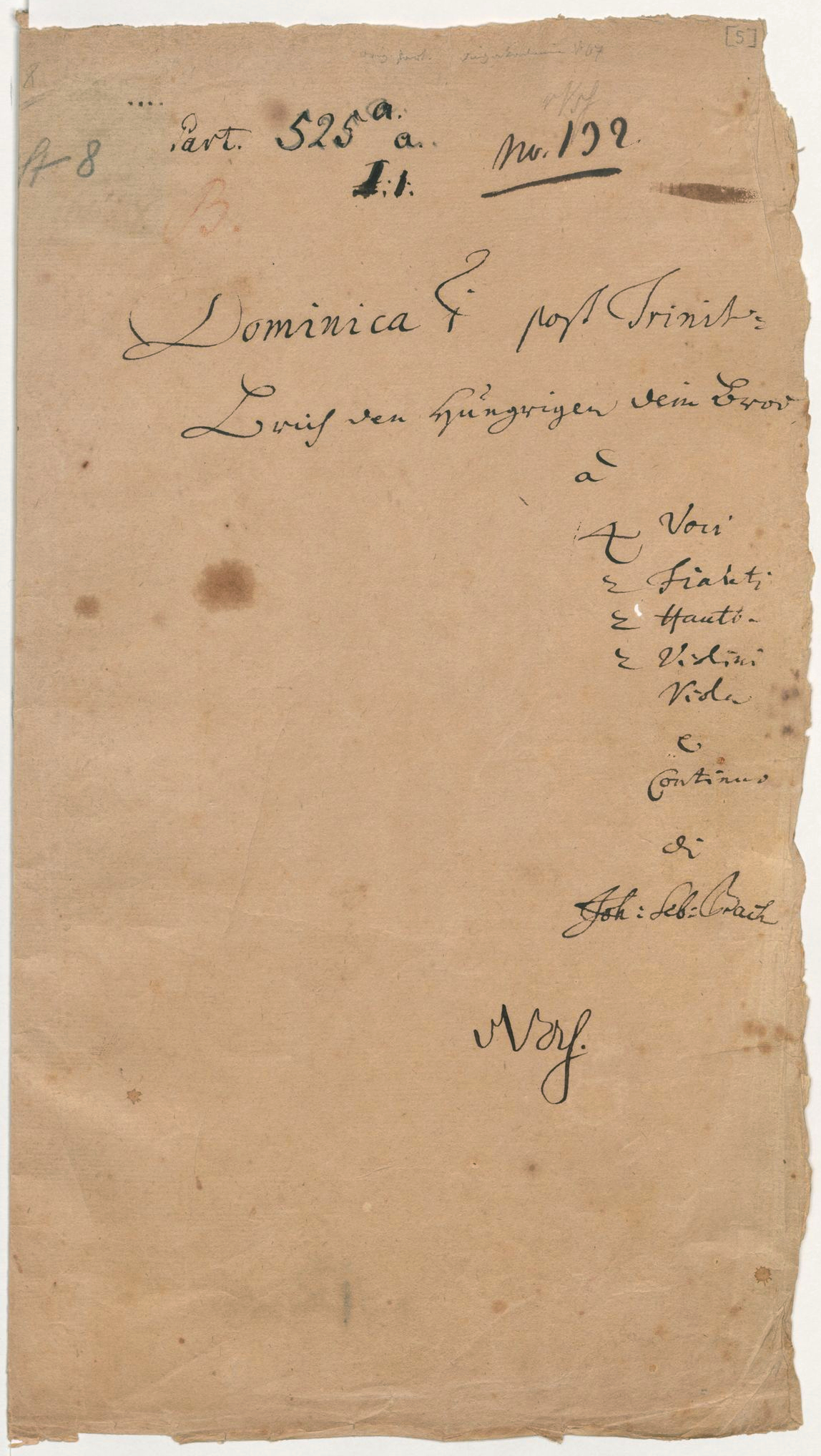
Original 1726 cover for vocal and orchestral parts of BWV 39 in Bach's handwriting

Bach scored the cantata for three vocal soloists (soprano (S), alto (A) and bass (B)), a four-part choir SATB, and a Baroque instrumental ensemble of two alto recorders (Fl), two oboes (Ob), first and second violins (Vl), violas (Va) and basso continuo (Bc). There are two sets of continuo parts from 1726: one is a score transposed for positive organ with figuration added by Bach in the first three movements; the other has annotations by the copyist for cello and double bass.

The Meiningen cantatas of Johann Ludwig Bach were scored for the four vocal parts and a small group of instrumentalists, consisting of two oboes, violins, violas and continuo: at Meiningen, as with many of the smaller courts in Germany, resources were limited; it appears that continuo instruments like bassoons were available only when these works were performed elsewhere. When Bach performed his cousin's cantatas in Leipzig in 1726, he used the same orchestral forces as Meiningen for all but two, adding trumpets with drums in one and piccolo trumpets in another.

The baroque alto recorder (Blockflöte in German) enjoyed a period of popularity in Europe as an orchestral instrument in the seventeenth century, starting with Monteverdi in his opera L'Orfeo. By the middle of the eighteenth century it had been displaced by the transverse flute. In France the transition was more marked, since cultural life centred on Paris; it was more gradual in Germany, made up of many separate principalities, all with their own court or municipal musicians. The baroque recorder was used in orchestral music in association with death and the supernatural; to express tenderness; in pastoral scenes (as the shepherd's pipe); and to imitate bird song.

Of no other instrument is Bach's characterisation so clear and consistent as the Blockflöte ... No other instrument identifies itself so closely with the simple piety of Bach. It voices his tenderness for his Saviour, his serene contemplation of death as the portal to the eternal ... it is the vehicle of mysticism so deep-rooted in Bach's nature... for in its clear tones he could utter the ponderings of his devout mind.

— Charles Sanford Terry

In his places of employment prior to his appointment in Leipzig in 1723, Bach used the recorder as an orchestral instrument many times in cantatas and concertos; at Leipzig his use of the recorder diminished and BWV 39 was the last cantata he composed that included the instrument. Manfred Ruëtz listed specific themes in movements of cantatas for which Bach had chosen the recorder: sleep, death, weeping, nature, sheep grazing, the singing of angels, and celestial light. Albert Riemenschneider wrote of "Bach's sensitivity to particular instruments ... to realize the spiritual intent which was inherent in their characteristic qualities"; even when Bach had only limited instruments at his disposal, he chose with care. Echoing Terry, Riemenschneider wrote that Bach "used the recorder for certain effects, where the text was especially intimate in the effacement of self and in the giving over to a higher power. He also used it for expressing extremely tender moments, where thoughts of death and the life to come were in question." The themes of the movements scored for recorders in Brich dem Hungrigen dein Brot conform to Riemenschneider's description.

The cantata BWV 39 is in two parts, conforming to the structure of the Meiningen series. The first part begins with a long choral movement for four-part chorus and full orchestra. It is followed by a recitative for bass and an aria for alto, with obbligato violin and oboe. The second part begins with the central movement based on the New Testament text, a solo for bass, as vox Christi, accompanied by an obbligato cello. It is followed by an aria for soprano with obbligato recorders in unison. The second recitative for alto and strings leads into the concluding four-part chorale in which the choir doubled by the full orchestra. The complex scoring of the monumental opening movement, employing full orchestra and chorus, contrasts with that of the succeeding non-choral movements, which are accompanied by smaller more intimate groups of instruments.

In the following table of the movements, the scoring follows the Neue Bach-Ausgabe. The keys and time signatures are taken from Alfred Dürr, using the symbol for common time (4/4). The instruments are shown separately for woodwind and strings, while the continuo, playing throughout, is not shown.

Movements of Brich dem Hungrigen dein Brot, Part I
No.	Title	Text	Type	Vocal	Woodwind	Strings	Key	Time
1	Brich dem Hungrigen dein Brot	Isaiah 58:7–8	Chorus	SATB	2Fl 2Ob	2Vl Va	G minor	3/4 • • 3/8
2	Der reiche Gott	anon.	Recitative	B			B♭ major–A minor	common time
3	Seinem Schöpfer noch auf Erden	anon.	Aria	A	Ob solo	Vl solo	D minor	3/8

Movements of Brich dem Hungrigen dein Brot, Part II
No.	Title	Text	Type	Vocal	Woodwind	Strings	Key	Time
4	Wohlzutun und mitzuteilen vergesset nicht	Hebrews 13:16	Solo	B		Vc solo	D minor	common time
5	Höchster, was ich habe	anon.	Aria	S	2Fl unison		B♭ major	6/8
6	Wie soll ich dir, o Herr	anon.	Recitative	A		2Vl Va	E♭ major–G minor	common time
7	Selig sind, die aus Erbarmen	Denicke	Chorale	SATB	2Fl 2Ob	2Vl Va	B♭ major	common time

=== Movements ===
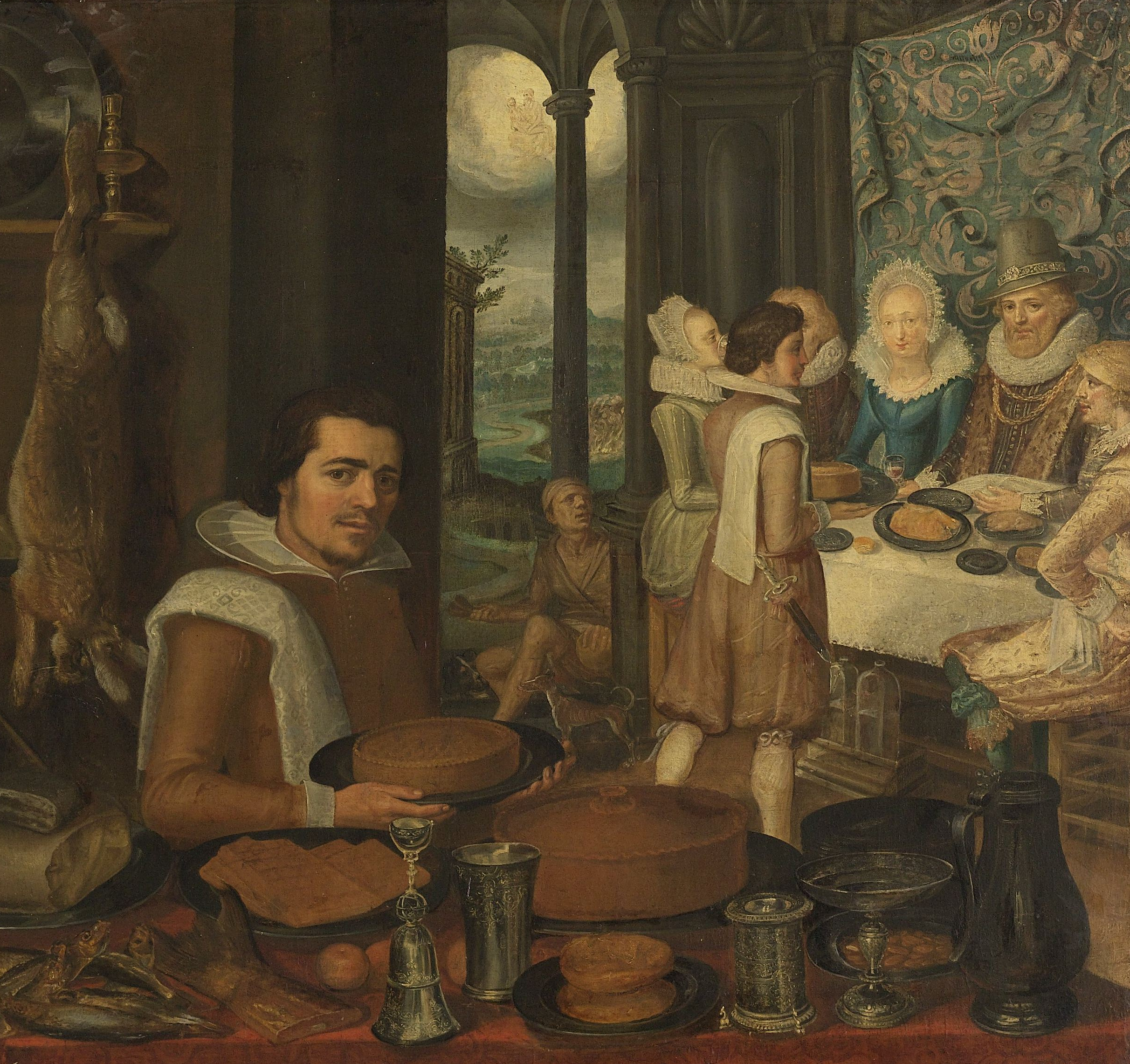
Parable of the Rich man and Lazarus (detail), Pieter Cornelisz van Rijck, 1610–1620

The cantata is written in seven movements, with a symmetrical form: the first and last movements are for chorus and orchestra; the second and sixth movements are recitatives; the third and fifth movements are arias in two parts with da capo repeats only for the instrumental ritornello; and the central fourth movement is an accompanied solo. The metrical English translations below of the texts of the first six movements are by Henry Sandwith Drinker; (Note: Other English translations for vocal editions were made by Paul England for Novello & Co and by Terry. Drinker's translation is used by Carus-Verlag (1999) and Terry's by Breitkopf & Härtel (1950).) and that of the seventh movement (chorale) is from the 1722 Psalmodica Germanica of John Christian Jacobi and Isaac Watts.

==== First movement ====
The crowning glory of the cantata is the opening chorus, varied, flexible, imaginative, every phrase is mirrored in music of superb quality. It is another miracle of the master's ...

— William Gillies Whittaker, The Cantatas of Johann Sebastian Bach, 1959

The Old Testament text is the librettist's adaptation of Isaiah 58:7–8, which Bach separated into three distinct statements:

Brich dem Hungrigen dein Brot
und die, so im Elend sind, führe ins Haus!

So du einen nacket siehest, so kleide ihn
und entzeuch dich nicht von deinem Fleisch.

Alsdenn wird dein Licht herfürbrechen
wie die Morgenröte,
und deine Besserung wird schnell wachsen,
und deine Gerechtigkeit wirdt
für dir hergehen,
und die Herrlichkeit des Herrn
wird dich zu sich nehmen.

Give the hungry ones thy bread
and all those in misery bring to thy house;

and when thou seest a naked one, so cover him,
and hide not thyself from thine own flesh.

Then straightway thy light shall break forth
as a bright morning dawneth;
then thy health speedily shall prosper,
and then shall thy righteousness
go onward before thee;
and the glory of the Lord
shall forthwith reward thee.

The monumental first movement, a long and complex chorus initially superposed on an elaborate orchestral ritornello, exemplifies how Bach—"with perfect mastery"—combined the considerable range of compositional skills at his disposal in BWV 39. The broad structure of the movement is derived from that of the motet, with each separate portion of the Old Testament text (Isaiah 58:7–8) receiving a different musical treatment matching the text. In the 218 bars, there are three distinct sections corresponding to the three pronouncements of Isaiah. The first and last section are highly developed, with fugal episodes; whereas the intermediate section is a short bridge between the two. Although simpler in form than the first and third sections, it combines musical features from both. The complex form of the first movement reflects the Old Testament text, which Dürr describes as long and "multifaceted". The structure of the movement can be summarised as follows:

- First section in 3/4 time: "Brich dem Hungrigen dein Brot" / Give the hungry ones thy bread
  - Orchestral sinfonia in G minor (bars 1–22)
  - Text sung in polyphony by the chorus, superposed on a slightly expanded version of the opening sinfonia, still in G minor (bars 23–46)
  - Fugal section for the choir eventually accompanied by orchestral motifs from the sinfonia; modulating from G minor to D minor (bars 47–69)
  - Reprise by chorus and orchestra of a variant of the second segment, now in the key of D minor (bars 70–93)
- Intermediate section in 4/4 time: "So du einen nacket siehest, so kleide ihn" / And when thou seest a naked one, so cover him
  - Text sung by chorus in madrigalian chords later accompanied by detached motifs divided between the three instrumental groups; modulating from D minor to C minor (bars 94–105)
- Final section in 3/8 time: "Alsdenn wird dein Licht herfürbrechen" / Then straightway thy light shall break forth
  - Fugal section in C minor for choir and continuo finally joined by the orchestra playing colla parte (bars 106–144)
  - Two homophonic choral sections with colla parte accompaniment sandwiched between three brief orchestral interludes (bars 145–167)
  - Reprise in G minor of fugal section with fugue subject mildy varied, instruments playing colla parte after first statement of fugue subject; ending with a short homophonic coda accompanying a reprise of the fugue subject (bars 168–218)

Hofmann summarises:

With the authority of an experienced musical architect, however, Bach has turned these words from the Bible into a large-scale structure, more than 200 bars long; despite the imposing dimensions, the listener perceives the piece as an intrinsically rounded, harmonically well-defined and comprehensible whole.

===== First section =====
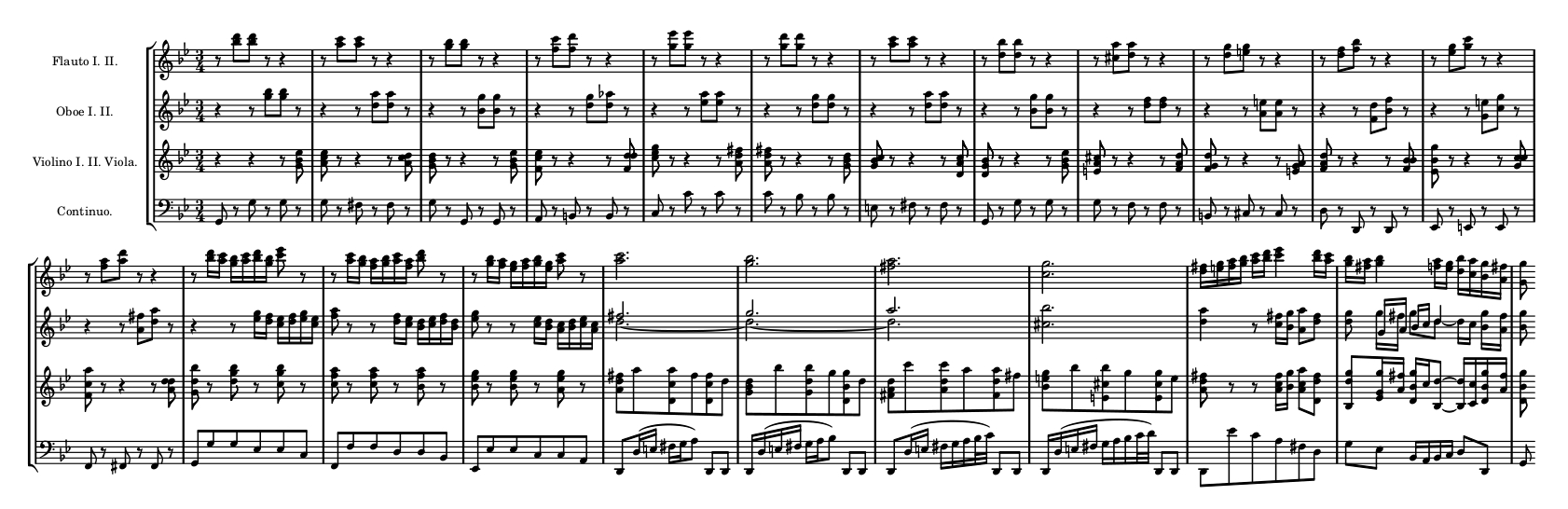

Opening sinfonia of BWV 39/i

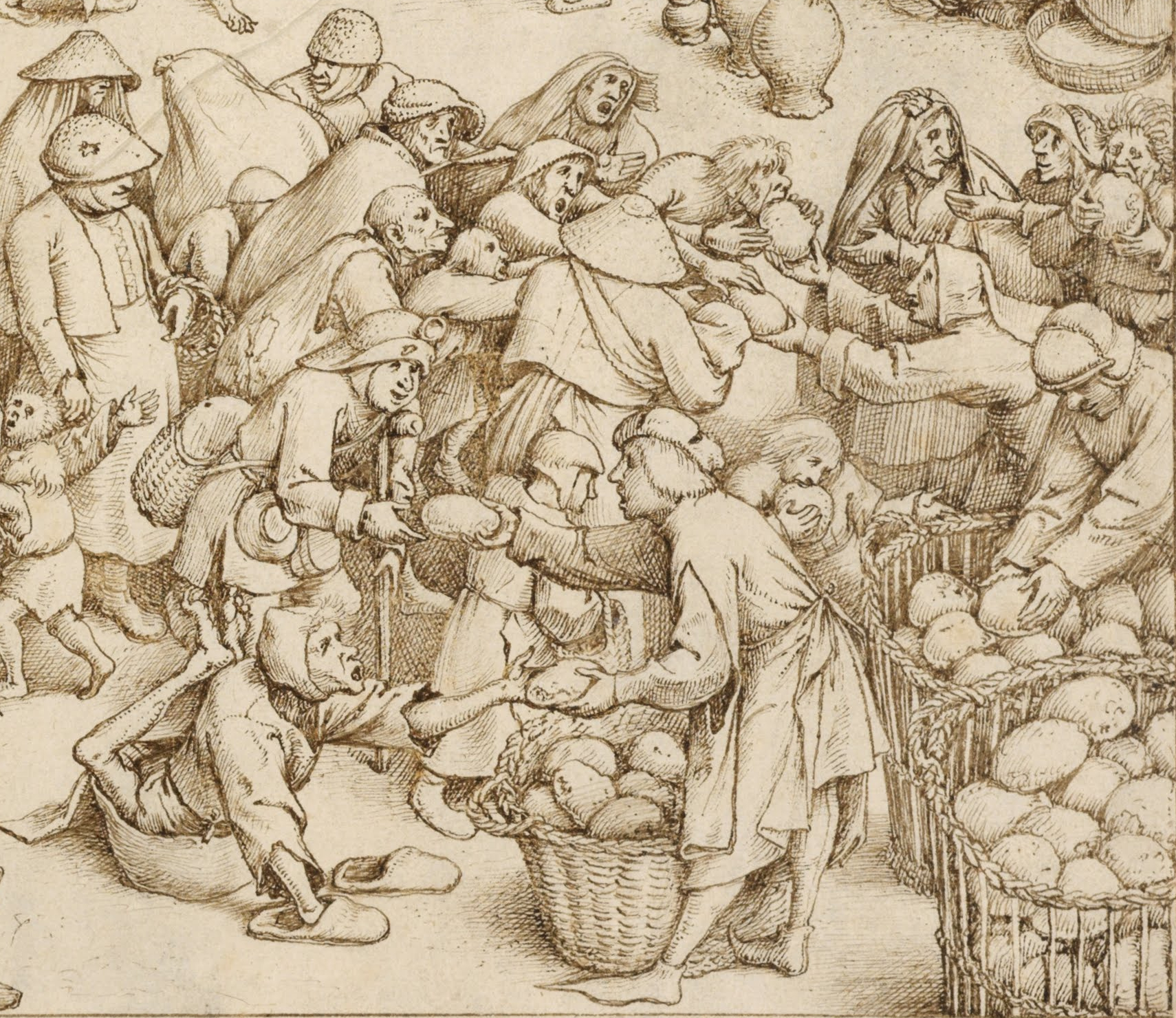
Feeding the hungry, detail from Caritas, The Seven Acts of Mercy, Pieter Bruegel the Elder, 1559

The movement opens with an extensive orchestral Sinfonia marked Concerto in the autograph score. Lasting 22 bars, this ritornello establishes the prevailing anguished mood of the first section. It is heard twice again, but only as the accompanying backdrop for the separate musical material of the chorus, a setting of the first phrase of the Old Testament text. The open motifs are also heard again in the fragmentary accompaniment of the central choral fugato episode between the two reprises of the ritornello. The different motifs in the ritornello thus also serve the purpose of accompanying specific parts of the text. The first predominant motif consist of detached repeated quaver chords, passed antiphonally between the three instrumental groups of recorders, oboes and strings. These are accompanied by similarly detached crotchets, scored as quavers with rests, in the walking bass of the continuo. After thirteen bars there follows a four bar passage of melifluous semiquaver passages in thirds for the recorders with imitative responses from the oboes; the upper strings take up the detached crotchets and the continuo the groups of detached repeated quavers. In the four succeeding bars the quaver figure in the continuo line is replaced by a new motif of rising semiquaver scales, with the detached quavers and crotchets passing into the upper strings and the woodwind playing sustained chords. In the concluding two bars of the sinfonia the semiquaver scale motif passes into the recorders in thirds and is taken up by the other instruments for the sustained final cadence.

Several commentators, most notably Philipp Spitta and more recently Dürr, have interpreted the repeated quaver figures passed between different groups of instruments as "unmistakably depict[ing] the gesture of breaking bread". Spitta also felt that the detached notes, which subsequently accompany quite different text, added "a tender, dreamy tinge" to the movement. For Albert Schweitzer and subsequent commentators like Alec Robertson, however, the motif represented the "uncertain, tottering steps ... of the wretched ones who are being supported and led into the house."

First section of BWV 39/i

After the closing cadence of the sinfonia, there is a reprise of the ritornello in the orchestra in a slightly expanded form. Immediately the chorus enters in pairs with their own musical material, singing in homphonic form. The word "brich" (break) in their initial declamatory phrase "Brich dem hungrigen dein Brot" is echoed in the pauses in the musical setting, pauses already present in the fragmentary detached quavers of the accompaniment. Equally well the repetition of this phrase is broken for one bar during which the original texture of the sinfonia is briefly heard again. John Eliot Gardiner describes the musical material as representing "imploring gestures, emotionally choked, their pleas breaking and stuttering". In contrast the following phrase "und die, so in Elend sind" has sustained melismas in all the parts on the word "Elend" (misery), with chromaticism, suspensions and descending quaver figures.

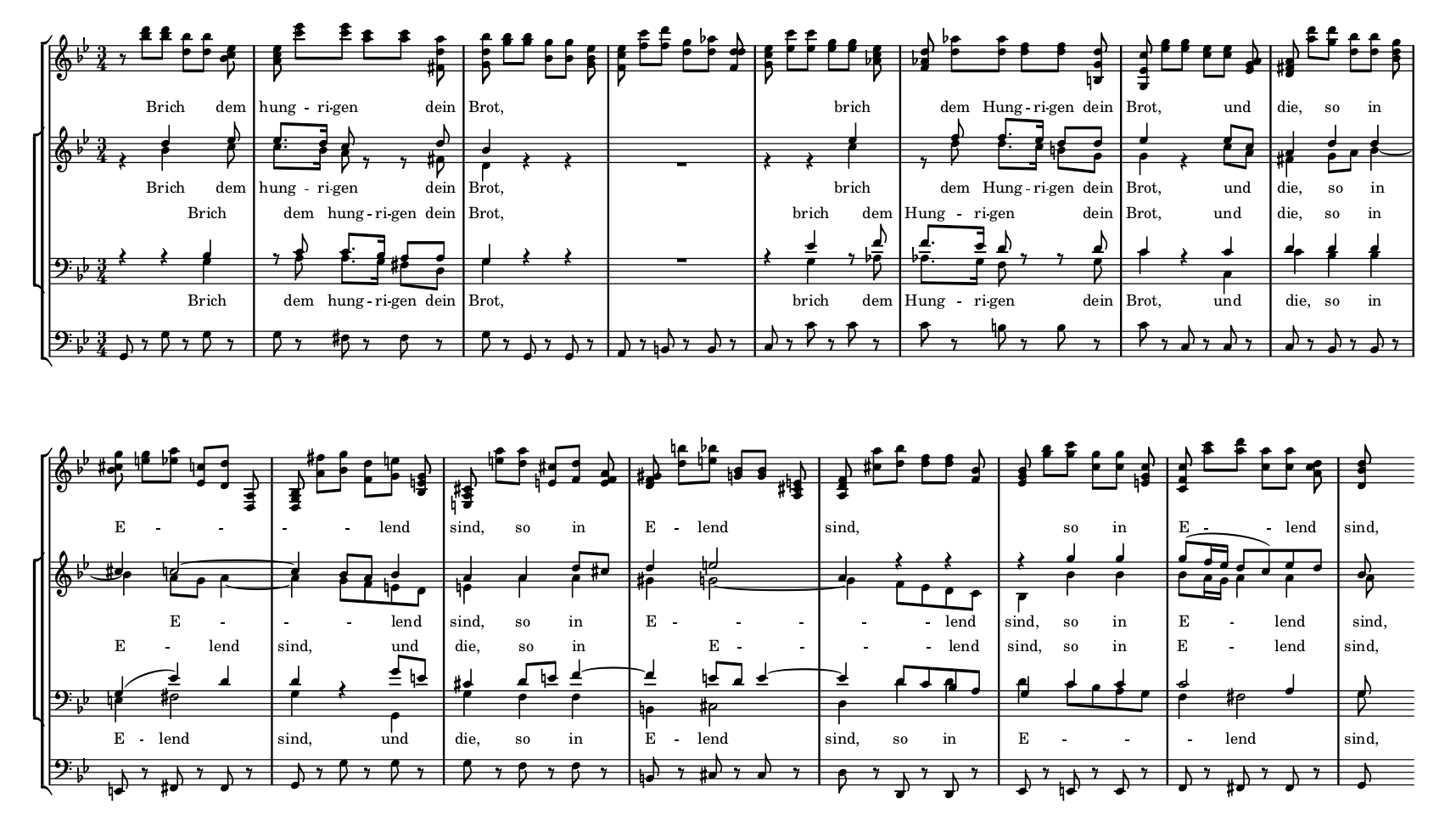

There is a further contrast in the next phrase "führe ins Haus" where the soprano and alto are paired with a long lyrical melisma in semiquavers on the word "führe" (lead). This new musical material is matched by the semiquaver figures of the woodwind. Similarly the detached quaver accompaniment in the continuo is matched by parallel figures in the tenor and bass parts. In the next four bars of this second rendition of the sinfonia, there is a reprise of the rising semiquaver figures in the continuo and sustained chords in the woodwind. In the first two bars each voice in the chorus enters successively with a new rising fourth motif for the phrase "und die" before the music intensifies as the chorus joins the sustained chords of the woodwind for the word "Elend". The final two bars of the closing cadence of the ritornello are more complex. On the one hand the mounting tension in the previous bars is resolved with the phrase "führe ins Haus" in the soprano, alto and bass voices.

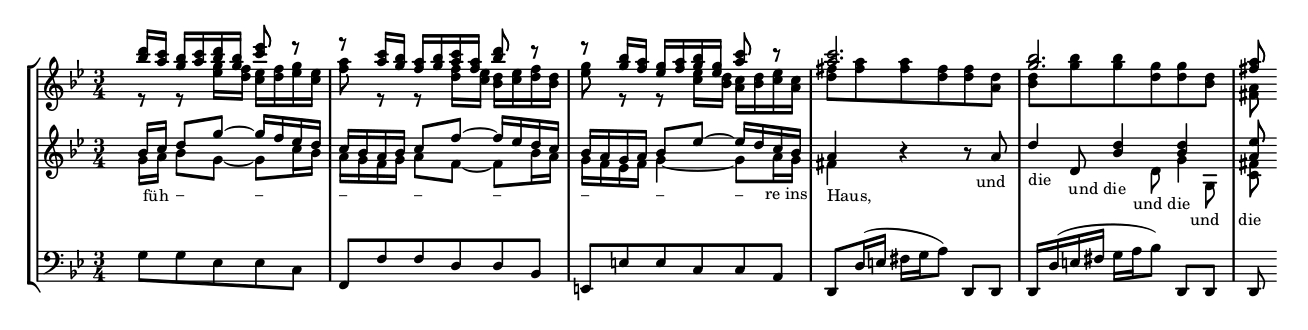

On the other hand, in the first of these two bars the tenor part embarks on the fugal subject of the following fugato section. The beginning of the subject is thus partially hidden or overlaid by the two bar cadence, from which it emerges. The condensed subject of the fugue incorporates the rising fourth motif for "und die" as well as the motif of rising semiquaver scales from the ritornello and the descending semiquaver scale from the soprano-alto melisma on "führe".

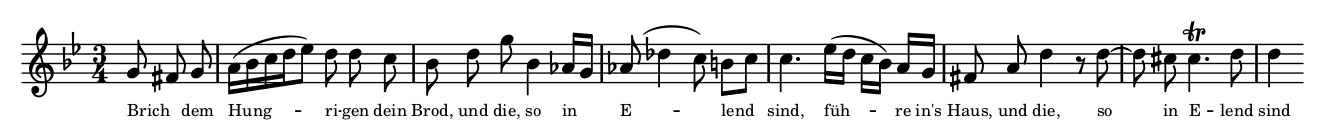

In the fugato section each voice in the chorus sings the fugal subject following the tenors: the altos come in next, emerging from the tenor part; then the sopranos, emerging from the alto part; and finally the fourth statement of the subject in the basses leads into a true repetition of the closing two bar cadence of the ritornello, with a reprise of the original accompaniment in the orchestra, thus concluding the fugato episode. As Gardiner comments, the first tenor entry with its prominent A flats and D flats "has a pathos all of its own, especially when for eight bars it is joined in imitation by the altos". The musicologist André Pirro notes that the A flat–D flat motif in the fugal subject on the word Elend is typical of Bach's use of suspended figures to evoke the burden of suffering and misery.

After the fugato episode, the ritornello resumes for a third time, with the chorus singing a variant of their homophonic material with much of the counterpoint inverted; this time, however, there is no fugal episode inserted before the final two bar cadence.

===== Intermediate section =====
Second section of BWV 39/i

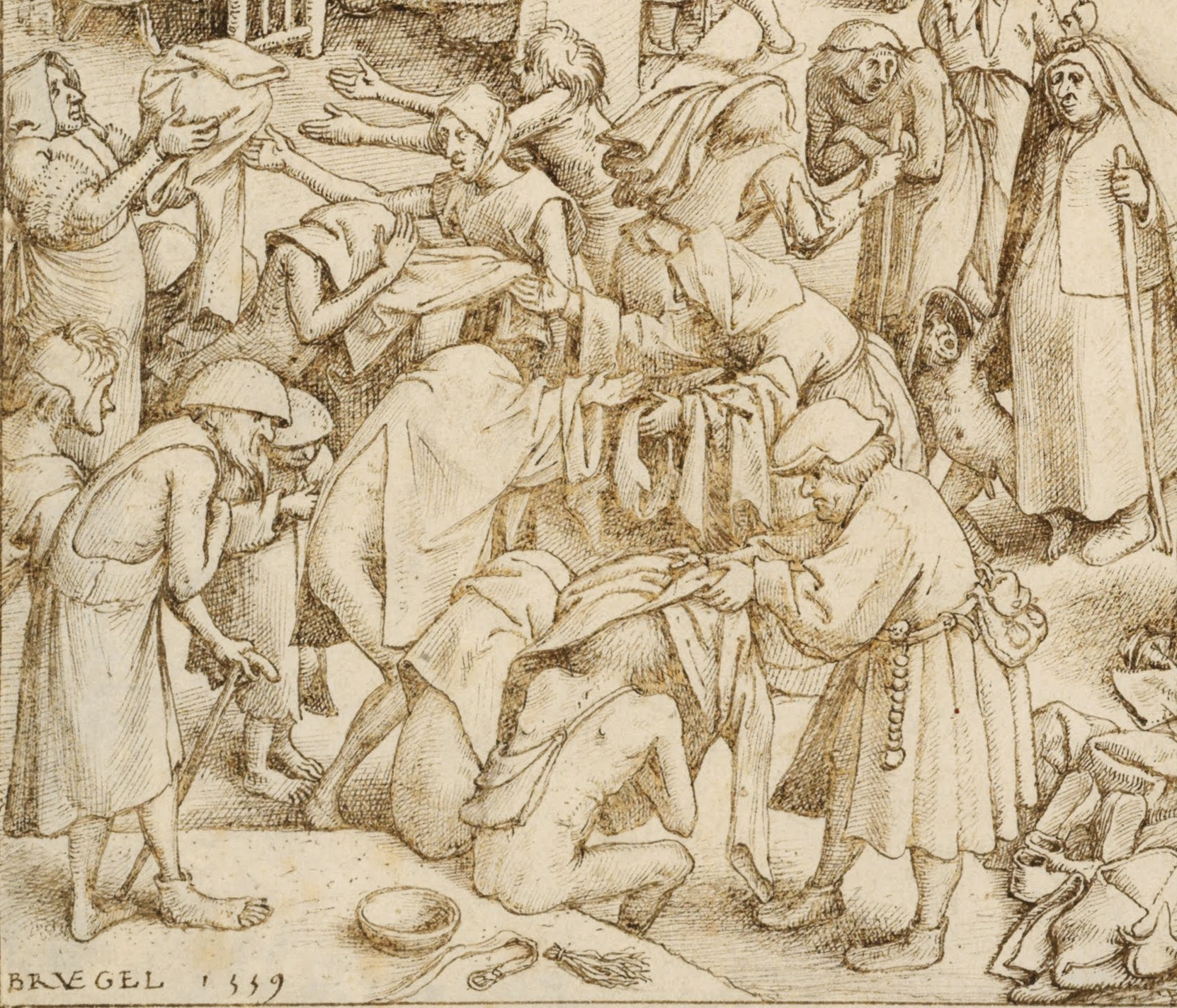
Clothing the naked, detail from Caritas, The Seven Acts of Mercy, Pieter Bruegel the Elder, 1559

The short second section in common time is a 12-bar bridging interlude linking the first and third sections. The key modulates from D minor to C minor, so that the surrounding first and third sections can modulate from their starting key to its dominant and thus the whole movement can return to its original key at the close.

The bridging section is composed in the seventeenth-century stile concertato, adopted in many of Bach's earlier Weimar cantatas, with the chorus playing the role of the concertino soloists and the orchestra the ripieno. The movement starts off with the basses singing "so du einen nacket siehest" (when thou naked seest), without any accompaniment even from the continuo.

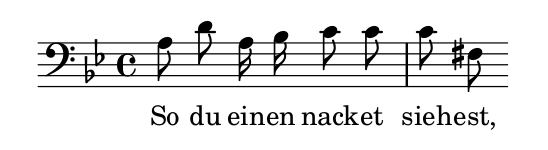

The full choir and orchestra respond with "so kleide ihn" (then clothe him), with alto recorders echoing the initial bass theme. In the next concertino passage the bass theme is sung by the altos, while the sopranos sing a florid counter-theme with semiquaver scales—a long melisma on "kleide".

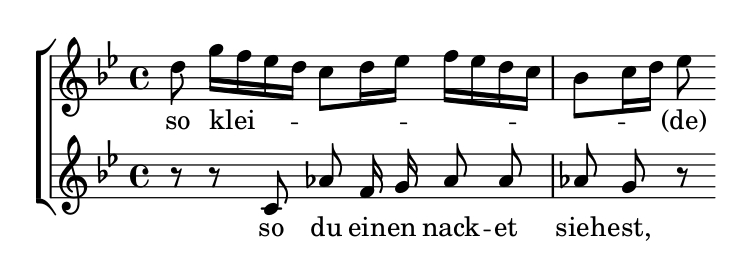

The bass theme is finally sung by the tenors, with the florid accompaniment in the altos and sopranos. In the second set of six bars, the choir sing the text "und entzeuch dich nicht von deinem Fleisch" (and hide not thyself from thine own flesh) in chords, taking up the repeated detached notes of the initial bass theme. The bass line incorporates the semiquaver scales.

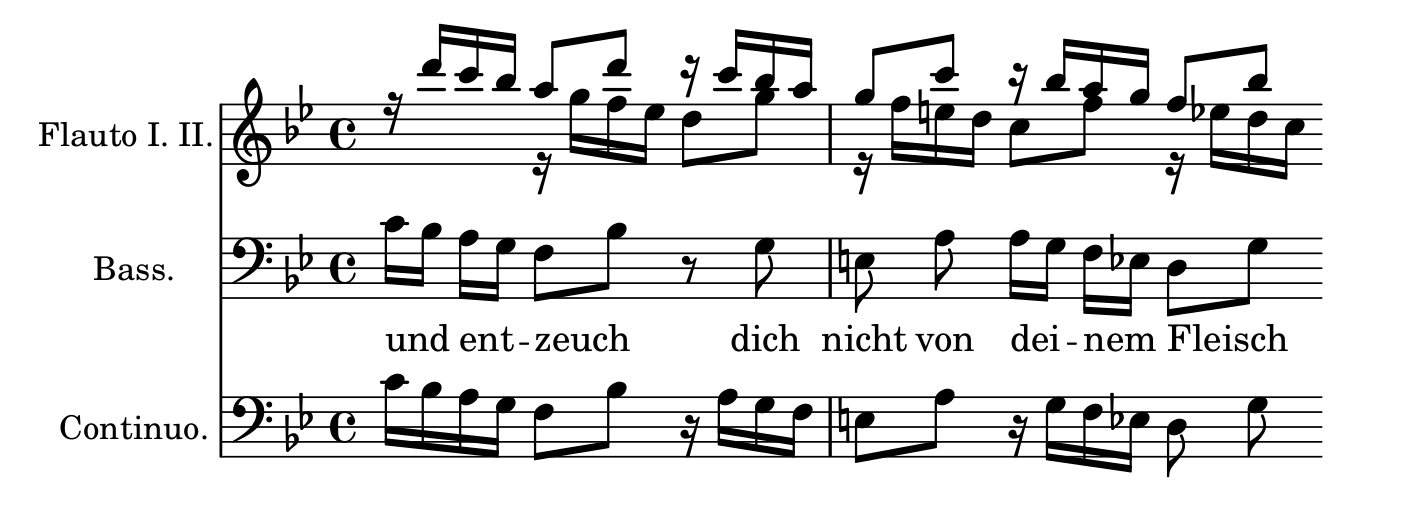

The beginning of the bass part provides a motif for the continuo accompaniment, which is imitated in counterpoint by the two alto recorders until the end of the section, producing a running line of semiquavers. The accompanying oboes and upper strings respond to each other with fragmented quaver motifs derived from the vocal material of this section as well as the quaver motifs in the first section.

Pirro has pointed out that the musical device of silencing parts of an ensemble is frequently used by Bach as a form of musical iconography. In this case the unaccompanied basses are "the musical equivalent of nakedness", while in contrast the full orchestra and chorus "unfolds itself in broad drapings to urge the merciful charity signified by the words 'clothe him'." This section is more lively than the first with a greater feeling of urgency.

===== Final section =====
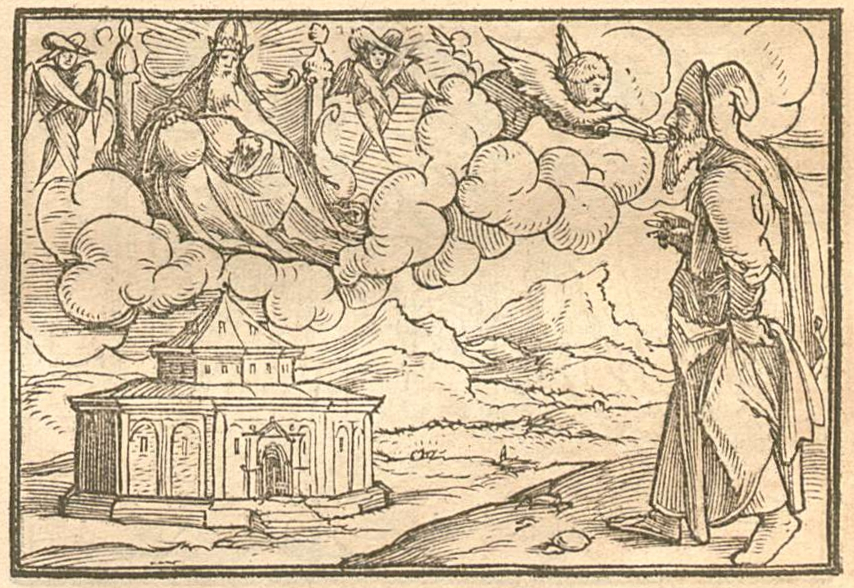
The prophet Isaiah, woodcut by Hans Holbein the Younger, 1538

Third section of BWV 39/i

In the last section in spirited 3/8 time, the predominant mood is of joyous exaltation reflecting the text from Isaiah. The structure of the choral material in this final section complements that of the first section; there a fugal passage was enclosed between two homophonic episodes; here a homophonic episode is preceded and followed by fugal passages. While the first section is preceded by the lengthy orchestral sinfonia, the final section ends with a short coda for full chorus and orchestra.

The fugue subject starts to the words "Alsdann wird dein Licht herfürbrechen wie die Morgenröte" in the tenor voice with an upbeat, continuing for seven bars as it begins a long melisma on the first syllable of "röte" (dawneth). (Note: The phrase translates literally as Then shall thy light break forth as the dawn where "dawn" is poetically rendered by the librettist as "morning-redness".) In the seventh bar the alto voice enters with the same subject, at which point the tenors takes up the material of the counter-subject for the next seven bars to conclude the melisma. Beneath both parts the continuo plays its own independent material, built up from two motifs: the first motif is a sospirans figure made up of four semiquavers followed by a scale of four ascending quavers, heard in the first two bars; and the second, which starts in the fifth bar, is an angular three-note quaver motif that descends in a sequence.

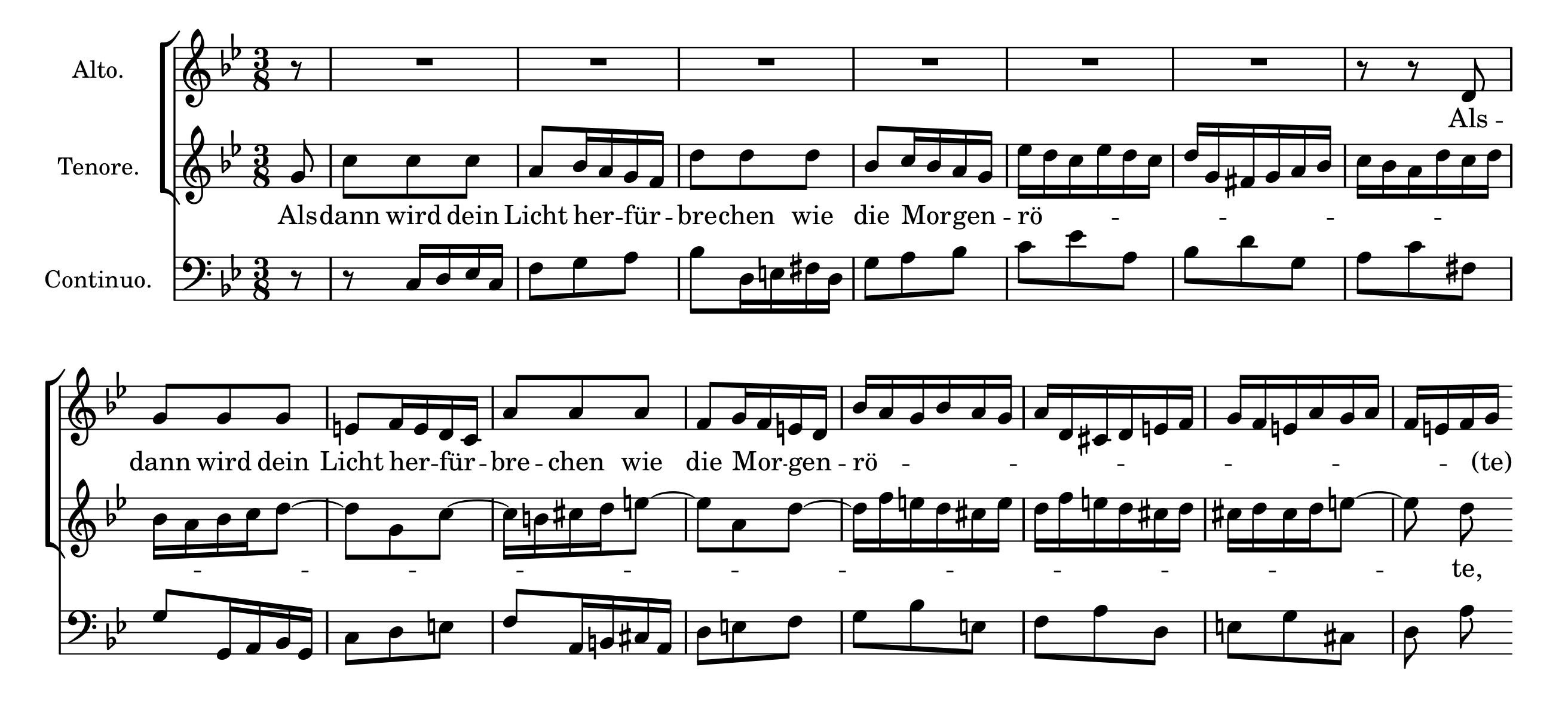

The altos and tenors are joined after seven bars by the fugue subject in the soprano voice. After a further seven bars the basses sing the last statement of the subject, accompanied by the full orchestra playing colla parte except for the two alto recorders, bringing the first fugato section to a close. The alto recorders play fragmented quaver figures in unison some of which are derived from the angular three-note continuo motif, leading into the first seven bar homophonic choral passage.

With a colla parte accompaniment in the oboes and continuo, the chorus sing the text "und deine Besserung wird schnell Wachsen" in clipped motet-style with chords and dotted rhythms, until a florid melisma in semiquavers on "Wachsen" (prosper). They are accompanied in the upper strings by detached quavers on the second and third beats of each bar; while the two alto recorders play in unison their own florid line of running semiquavers derived from the semiquaver figures in the fugue counter-subject.

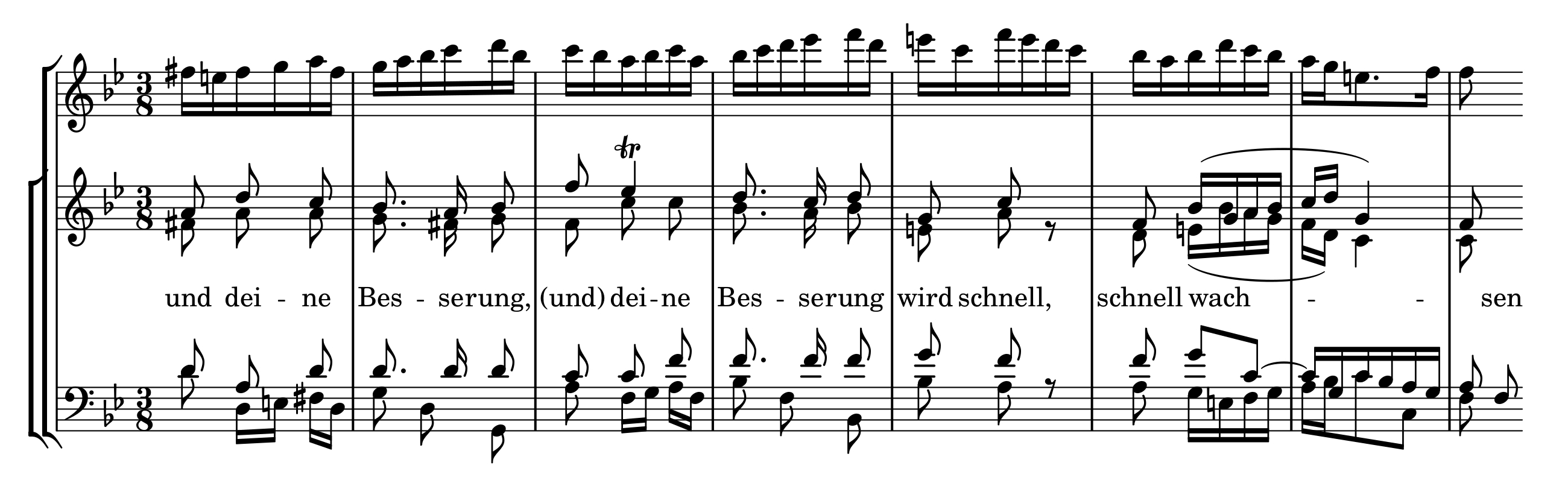

This homophonic choral passage is followed by the first of three short four-bar orchestral ritornellos, with a texture that has already been heard very briefly in the bar when the chorus pause between the fugato and homophonic passages. As in the opening sinfonia, the instruments play in four distinct groups—alto recorders, oboes, upper strings and continuo—but the sparseness there is now replaced by a jubilant canzona-style flourish.

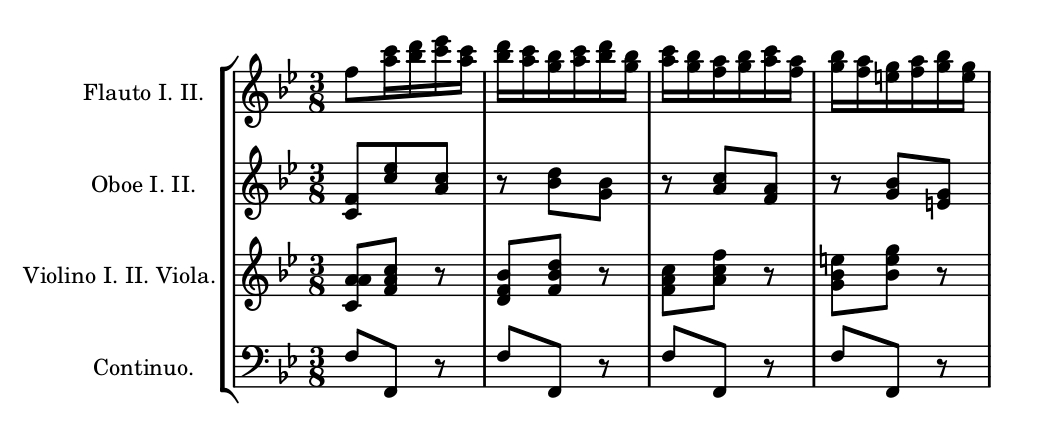

The semiquaver motifs in the alto recorders were already heard in the second and third bars of the obbligato accompaniment to the homophonic episode, but here they play in thirds. The other orchestral groups play pairs of detached quaver chords, with upper strings on the beat and oboes off the beat. The choir then rejoin the orchestra for the second of the three homophonic passages to the text "und dein Gerechtigkeit wird vor dir hergehen". At fourteen bars in length, it is the longest and most complex of the three. The broad structure of the episode is a canon between the soprano and bass parts.

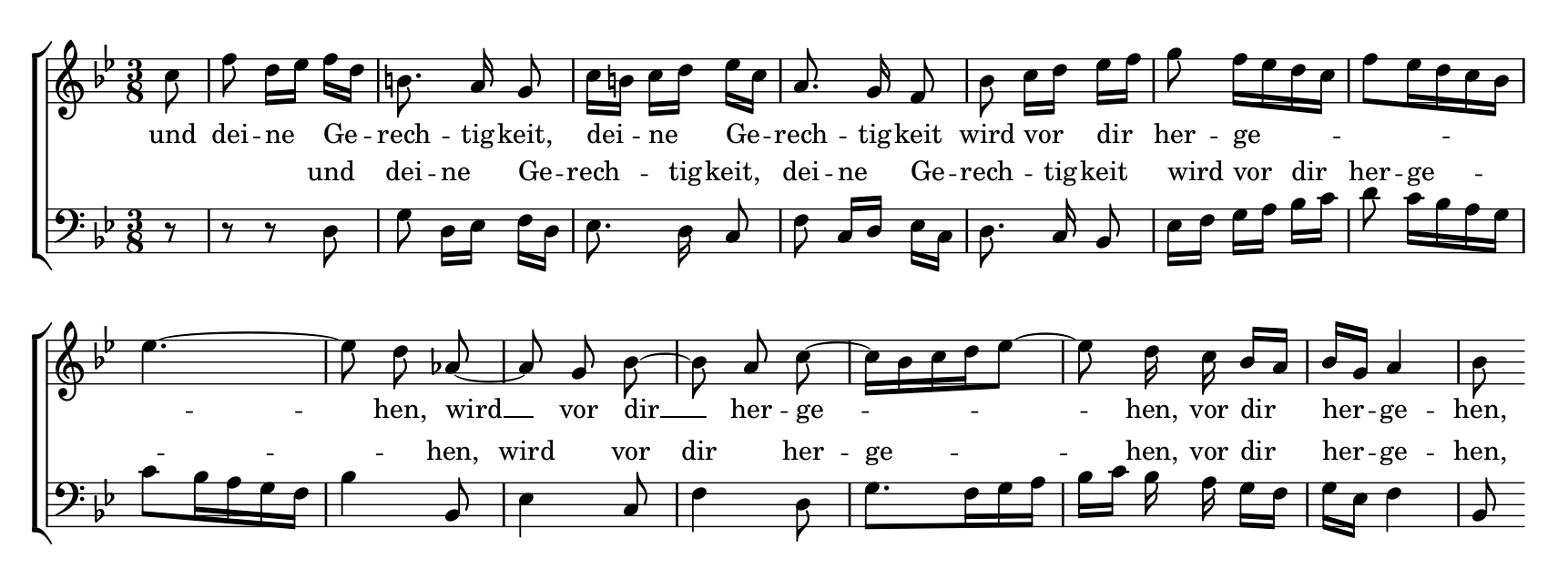

The canonic entries are separated by a bar until the stretto starting in the ninth bar when they are separated by a quaver. The vocal line is ingeniously composed from figures that have already been heard in the section: the start of the fugue subject; the initial sospirans continuo motif with its second part inverted and in dotted rhythm, like the opening "Hungrigen" of the first section; the semiquaver scales in the fugue subject and their inversions; and the portion of the fugue counter-subject with suspensions. There are two melismas on "hergehen" (go onward), with the second one—during the stretto—rising to a climax before a concluding two bar cadence similar to the one in the first homophonic passage. The alto and tenor voices at first accompany the canon with imitative figures; but during the stretto the alto pairs with the soprano in thirds and the tenor pairs with the bass. The rest of the orchestra play colla parte with the singers except for the alto recorders. As in the first homophonic section they play an obbligato accompaniment in unison. Before the stretto it is formed of running semiquavers, made up of the ritornello motif and the scales of the vocal parts. During the stretto they play anapaests—motifs of joy—off the beat, increasing the level of excitement and adulation in all the voices. After the cadence, the movement is punctuated by a second rendition of the four-bar orchestral ritornello. This time the oboes play the semiquaver motif, the alto recorders play the pair of detached quavers on the beat and the upper strings those off the beat. This leads into the second fugato episode in the key of C minor.

The fugue subject, initially sung by the basses to the words "und die Herrlichkeit des Herrn wird dich zu sich nehmen", is a slight variant of the original one. This can be seen by comparing the tenor line in the first fugato episode with the alto entry in the second.

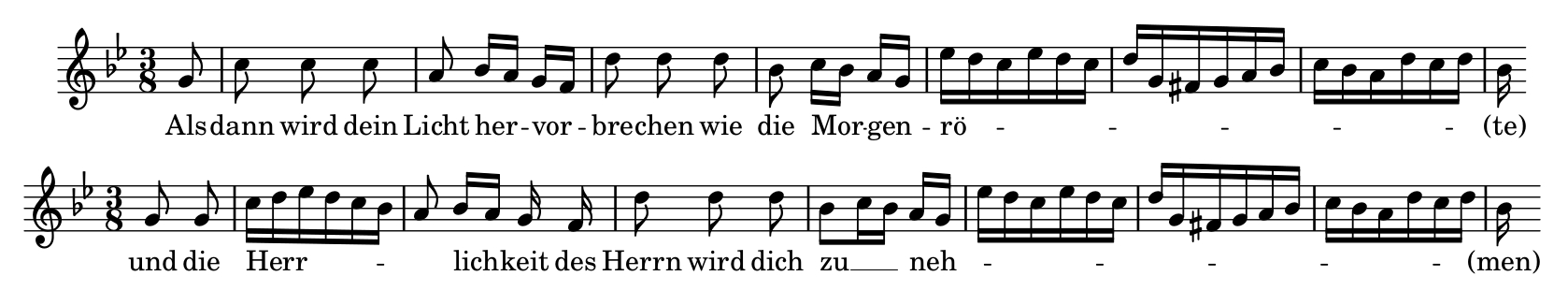

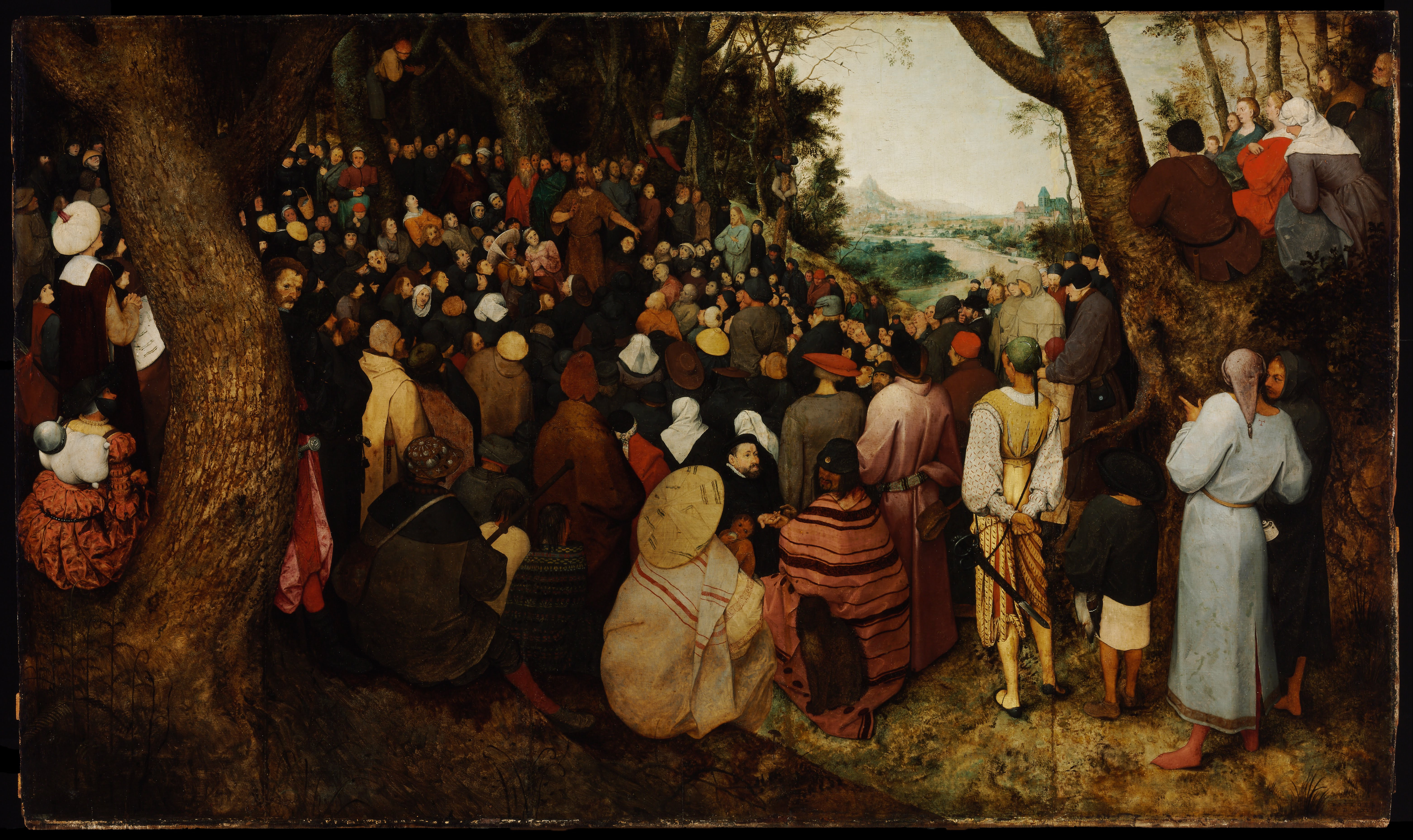
Pieter Bruegel the Elder, Sermon of St John the Baptist, 1566: the multitude gather to hear John the Baptist as he tells them that the kingdom of heaven is at hand and enjoins them to acts of charity, according to Matthew 3:1–17 and Luke 3:3–17

Like the first and second homophonic passages, however, the first and second fugato episodes differ in unexpected ways, resulting in a more elevated mood and richer orchestral texture. The fugato episode is lengthened by having a new fifth fugal voice provided by the alto recorders in unison, scored in flowing semiquavers. The chorus and alto recorders enter in the following order: basses, tenors, altos, alto recorders and finally sopranos. All the voices have long melismas on the word "nehmen". The continuo reprise the accompaniment of the first fugato episode during the first statement of the fugue subject and counter-subject in the basses. This time, however, there is an additional accompaniment from the two alto recorders consisting mainly of the quaver motifs from the ritornello. The alto recorders then briefly fall silent, while the basses unite with the continuo part, singing its independent musical material until the end of the episode. After the first entry of the basses, the other instrumental groups enter to play colla parte with each new voice: the violas enter with the tenors; the second oboe and second violins enter with the altos; the two alto flutes enter in unison; and finally the sopranos enter with the first oboe and first violins. The anticipated entry of the sopranos after the altos is further delayed by the extension of the fugue subject in the alto recorders by four bars, with repetitions of the figures in bars 1–2 and 5-6; all the material is played at unexpected pitches. Below the fugue subject in the two recorders, the altos and tenors sing imitative syncopated responses based on the counter-subject, leading up to the true entry of the sopranos. With the recorders taking up the counter-subject, the sopranos sing the fugue subject at its expected pitch, with the imitative polyphony continuing in the middle voices, bringing the fugato episode to its concluding cadence.

The orchestral ritornello punctuates the movement for a third and last time, the upper strings playing the semiquaver figures, with the detached quavers on the beat in the oboes and off the beat in the alto recorders. It leads directly into the homophonic coda in the last seven bars of the movement. With the same orchestral pairings as the fugato episode, the sopranos joyously sing out the beginning of the second fugue theme below trilling recorders before joining the polyphony of the other voices—with a last emphatic sospirans figure in the basses—for the final exultant rendition of the text.

As Whittaker states, this "short tutti outburst ... closes this superb chorus in a blaze of 'Herrlichkeit'." Gardiner, commenting on the change of mood in the final section, writes, "The sense of relief after the stifling pathos of the opening sections is palpable ... After so much pathos, the final coda led by the sopranos releases the pent-up energy in an explosion of joy." Robertson comments, "The words, to the end of this section, are based on Isaiah 58:7-8 ... It brings Jesus' words to mind, 'Inasmuch as you do it unto them, you do it unto me' and his denunciation of the careless rich. Isaiah continues, 'Then shall thy light break forth as the morning and thy healing shall spring forth speedily; and thy righteousness shall go before thee.' Bach sets the paraphrase of these last words to a glorious fugue, with two expositions, and so brings to an end one of his finest choruses and one that is worthy indeed of the inspired words of Isaiah."

expresses his admiration for Bach's setting: "The chorus of the first movement, set to two beautiful verses of Isaiah, brings out the meaning of that text in the Sermon on the Mount, 'Blessed are the merciful, for they shall obtain mercy', and the cantata is fitly concluded with the sixth verse of the paraphrase of the beatitudes. It is an affecting picture of Christian love, softening with tender hand and pitying sympathy the sorrow of the brethren, and obtaining the highest reward." Gardiner noted the "immensity, vigour, flexibility and imagination of the opening chorus". Cantagrel describes the perfect balance in the proportions of the different sections, "marking a magnificent journey from darkness into light": the first fugato episode represents "the light emanating from the merciful walking in the paths of righteousness"; the second "the light of the glory of God".

==== Second and third movements ====
The four movements (2,3,5 and 6) placed symmetrically around the central New Testament passage in the fourth movement, are all settings of Madrigal-style verse, with recitatives in Alexandrine poetry.

The second movement is a setting of a lengthy text beginning "Der reiche Gott wirft seinen Überfluss auf uns, die wir ohn ihn auch nicht den Odem haben" (The Lord provides: He pours his riches down on us; without this nothing here on earth would flourish). Bach set it as an unadorned secco recitative, without arioso episodes, accompanied by bare sustained notes in the continuo. The bass soloist proclaims that God's abundant gifts should be shared with the poor and lowly; and that consideration for the needy, not wealth used for tributes, will find favour with God.

Third movement

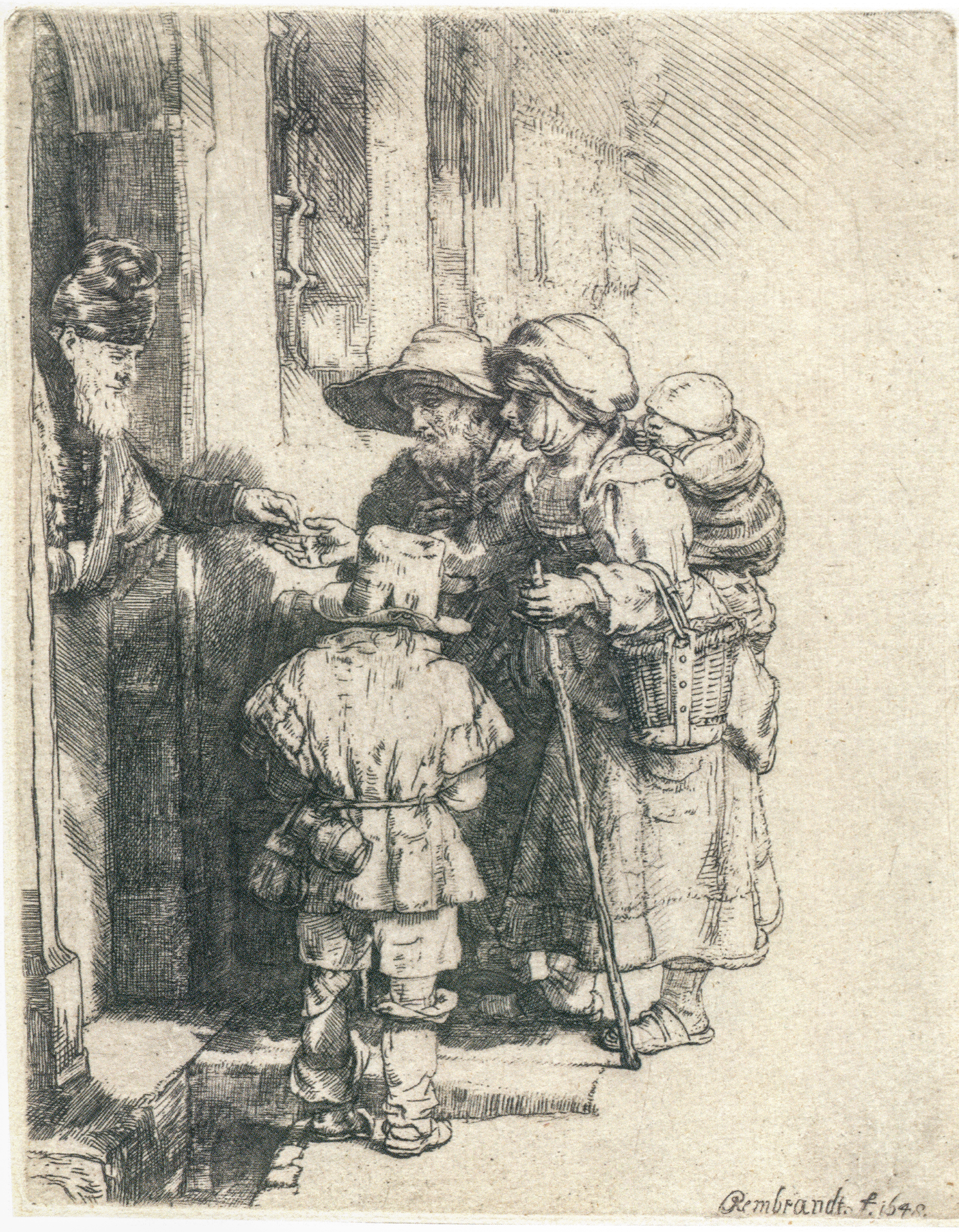
Beggars receiving alms at the door of a house, engraving by Rembrandt, 1648

This leads into an alto aria accompanied by obbligato violin and oboe:

Seinem Schöpfer noch auf Erden
Nur im Schatten ähnlich werden,
Ist im Vorschmack selig sein.

Sein Erbarmen nachzuahmen,
Streuet hier des Segens Samen,
Den wir dorten bringen ein.

Life is but a paltry measure
But a foretaste of the treasure,
We with Him will one day share;

Who His love is here expressing,
Sows the seeds of future blessing
Which we harvest with Him there.

The theme of the text is that, although man may follow God's example during his lifetime, it is only in heaven that he will reap the benefits of the seeds he has sown. The aria, of dance character between minuet and passepied, starts with a ritornello in trio sonata form for the concertante solo violin and oboe over a steady continuo bass line. The ritornello is made up of a continuous stream of distinctive semiquaver motifs played against sustained notes, which alternate between the two solo instruments as they respond to each other imitatively and in canon. The semiquaver motifs occasionally and briefly pass to the continuo part.

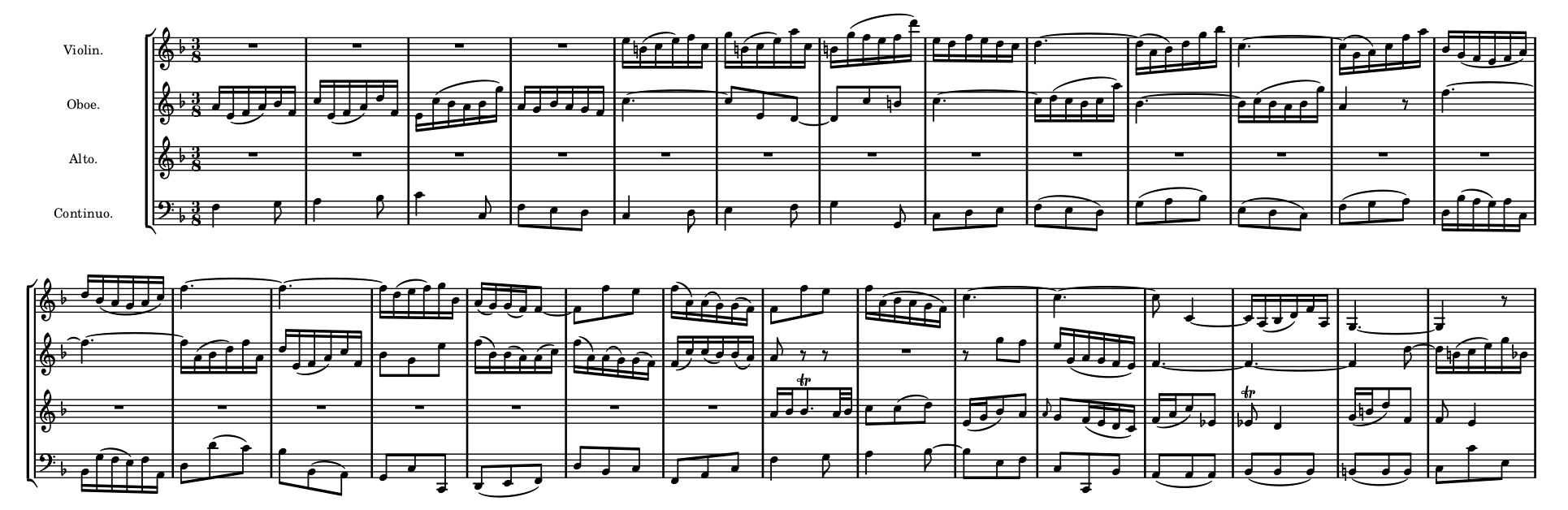

The alto enters with its own separate themes (see above) singing the first half of the text; the obbligato instruments weave a contrapuntal accompaniment around the vocal line with motifs from the ritornello. The words are sung a second time in a different setting, with melismas derived from semiquaver motifs in the ritornello together with new quaver motifs:

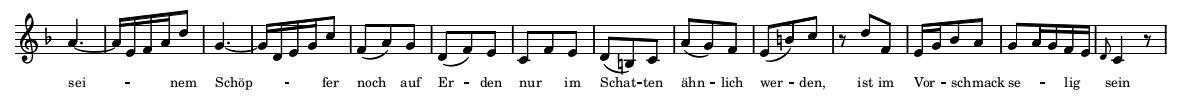

An episode for the concertante instruments based on the ritornello is then followed by the alto singing the second half of the text; a further instrumental interlude is followed by a second alto rendition of the same words, after which the aria concludes with a da capo repetition of the opening ritornello. Each of these two alto sections begins with the same musical figures as its first entry. The material there is developed with motifs from the ritornello reflecting the intensifying mood: the word streuet ("sow") is set to long and enraptured semiquaver melismas;

and the "ein" in the contrasting phrase bringen ein ("reap")—a reference to eternity—is sustained on a single note for four bars.

==== Fourth movement ====
The text of the fourth movement is adapted from St Paul's Epistle to the Hebrews:

Wohlzutun und mitzuteilen vergesset nicht;
denn solche Opfer gefallen Gott wohl.

Do thou good and help thy neighbour, forget it not;
such sacrifices are pleasing to God.

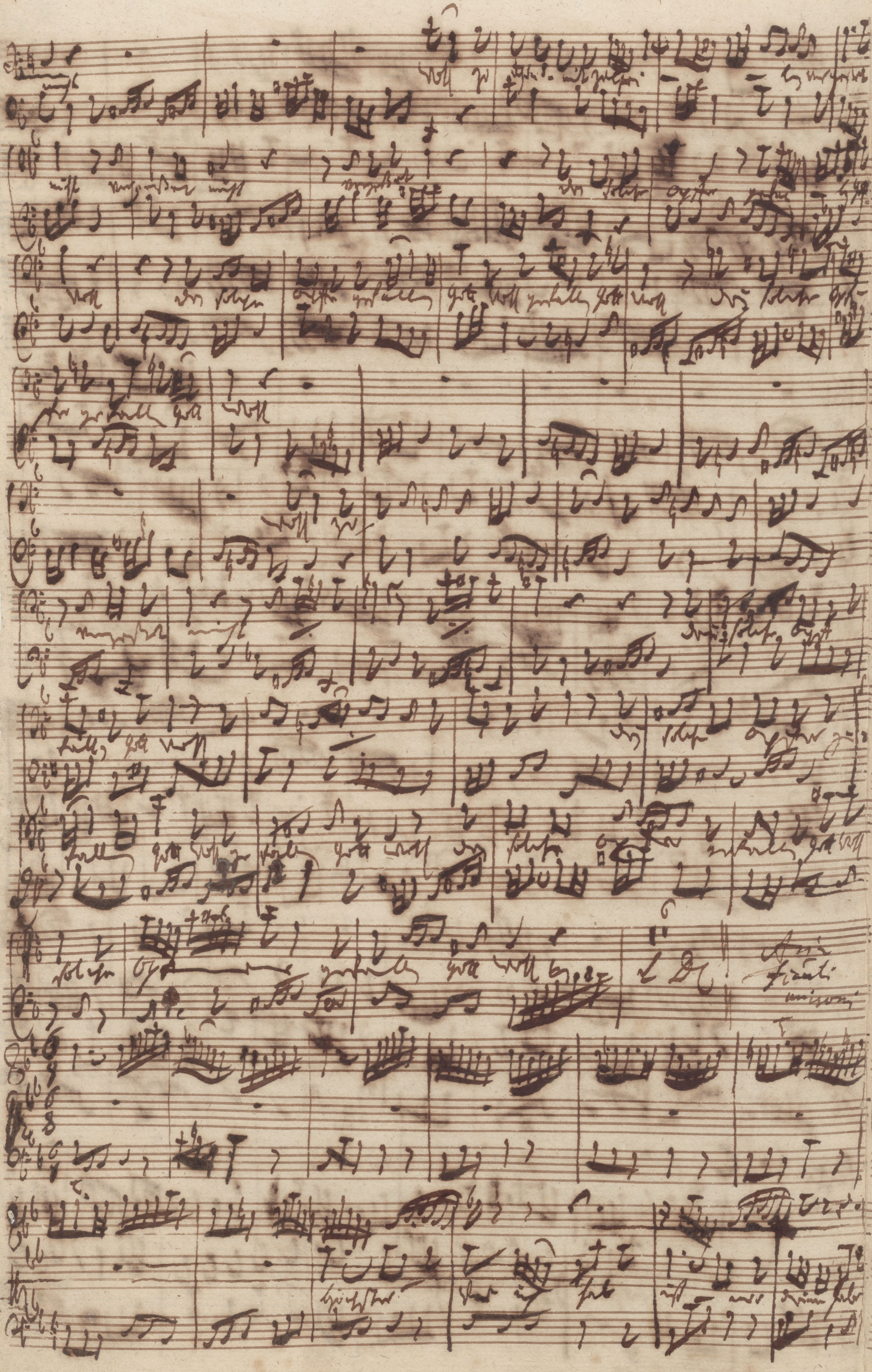
Page from autograph score showing end of fourth movement and beginning of fifth movement

It is sung by the bass, the vox Christi (voice of Christ), as if the words were spoken by Jesus himself. The style is typical of Bach's treatment of such declamatory texts, a compositional style between arioso and aria. The bass solo is accompanied by an obbligato cello, with an ever-varying melodious dialogue in canon and counterpoint; the thematic material in the bass solo

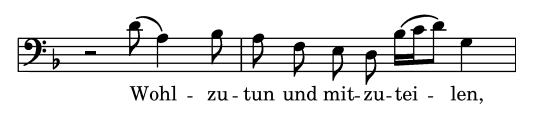

is introduced in the opening ritornello of the cello which also concludes the movement. The opening phrase is repeated seventeen times in the continuo part as a form of quasi-ostinato motif. As Cantagrel states, this lyrical movement, with its insistence, its repetitions of the text and its vigour, eloquently proclaims the spiritual themes of the second part.

==== Fifth and sixth movements ====
Fifth movement of BWV 39

The fifth movement is the second aria of the cantata, scored for soprano with an obbligato accompaniment provided by the two recorders playing in unison.

Höchster, was ich habe,
Ist nur deine Gabe.
Wenn vor deinem Angesicht

Ich schon mit dem Deinen
Dankbar wollt erscheinen,
Willt du doch kein Opfer nicht.

Master, all my living
Follows from Thy giving.
Let my little all suffice

If I all restore Thee,
When I come before Thee,
Let this be my sacrifice.

The text, addressed to God, expresses faith, thankfulness and humility. The recorder ritornello is written in concertante style, with constantly flowing semiquaver figures, unhurried with no hint of virtuosity. It contrasts with the sustained quavers of the cantabile vocal part, which is imbued with the qualities of a "simple song". The aria follows the same scheme as the first alto aria, with the text divided into two halves, each sung twice, interspersed with instrumental interludes which conclude with a da capo reprise of the ritornello.

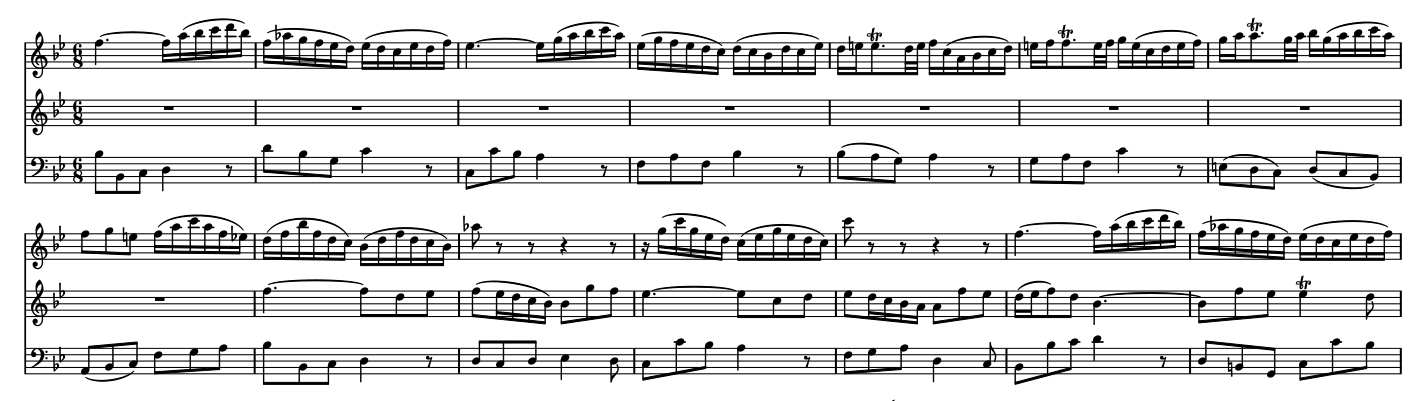

The sixth movement is an alto recitative. The lengthy text begins "Wie soll ich dir, o Herr, denn sattsamlich vergelten, was du an Leib und Seel mir hast zugutgetan?" (How might then I, O Lord, sufficiently repay thee for all that thou hast done, my flesh and soul to feed?). It is a further supplication to God, giving thanks for His gifts, recognizing the duty to help the needy and praying to be rewarded in the hereafter. Like the first recitative, it is declamatory without arioso sections; but in this case, instead of a bare bass line, it is accompanied by sustained chords in the string section, marked piano, which help create the prayer-like mood.

==== Seventh movement ====
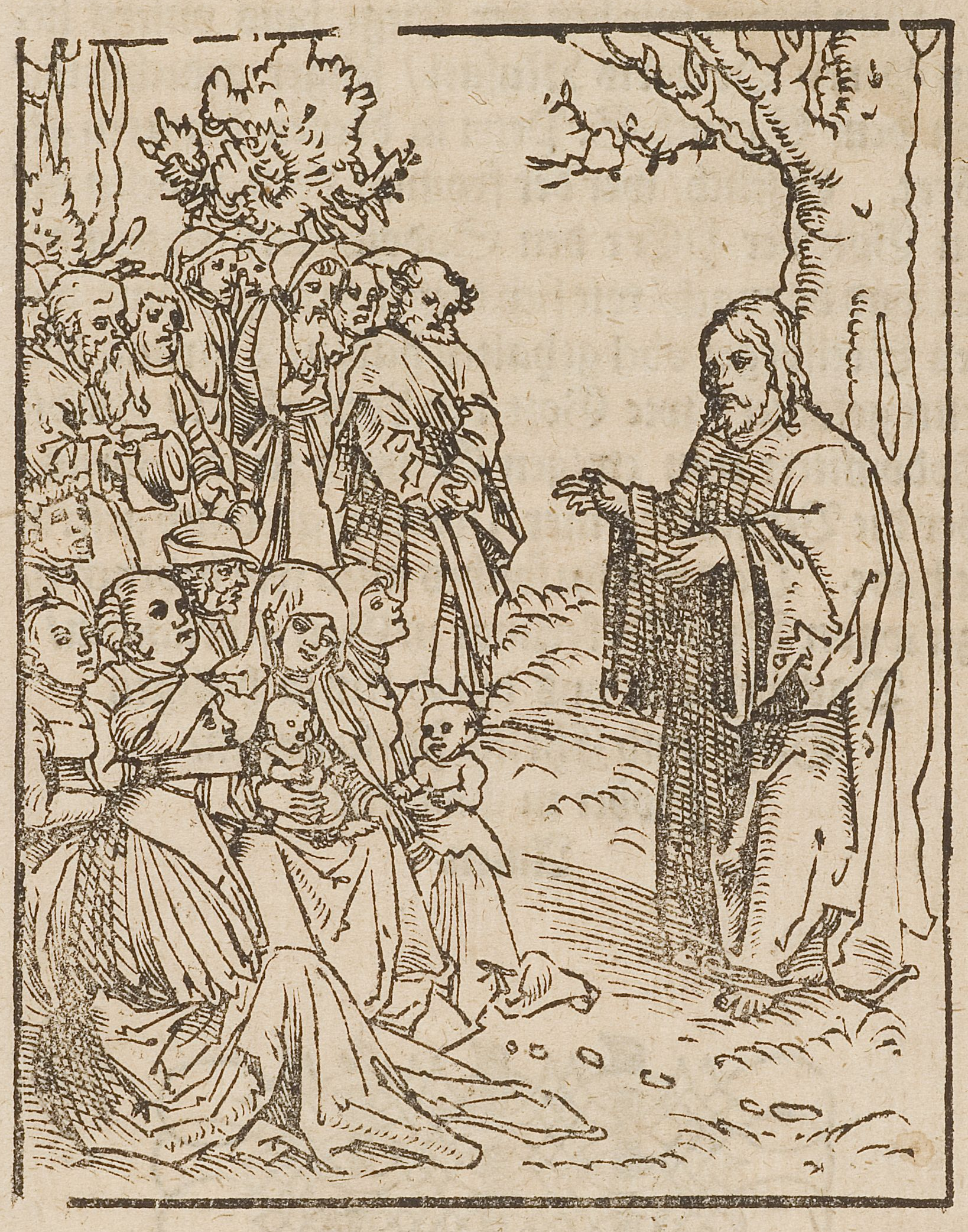
The Sermon on the Mount, woodcut by Lucas Cranach the Elder, 1582

The concluding chorale of the cantata is a plain four-part harmonisation of the sixth stanza of David Denicke's hymn "Kommt, laßt euch den Herren lehren" (1648), with the orchestra doubling the vocal parts.

The translation of the text is from the 1723 Psalmodica Germanica of John Christian Jacobi and Isaac Watts.

Selig sind, die aus Erbarmen
Sich annehmen fremder Not,
Sind mitleidig mit den Armen,
Bitten treulich für sie Gott.
Die behülflich sind mit Rat,
Auch, wo möglich, mit der Tat,
Werden wieder Hülf empfangen
Und Barmherzigkeit erlangen.

Blest are those who with compassion
Look upon their neighbour's grief,
Pitying poverty's oppression,
Pray to God for its relief;
Who assist the sufferer's need,
Not with word alone, but deed,
They shall never be discarded,
But with Mercy be rewarded.

Denicke's hymn is a versification of the Sermon on the Mount, in which each beatitude is elaborated in a separate verse. The sixth verse corresponds to the fifth beatitude from Matthew 5:7: "Blessed are the merciful: for they shall obtain mercy."

The hymn is sung to the melody of "Freu dich sehr, o meine Seele", first published as a hymn tune by Louis Bourgeois. Bach had previously produced similar harmonisations to different texts in BWV 25, BWV 196 and BWV 32; the chorale from BWV 39, transposed to G major, appears as number 67 in the collection of harmonised chorales prepared by Carl Philipp Emmanuel Bach for Breitkopf and Härtel, reproduced with the same number in the collection of Riemenschneider.

== Recordings ==
A list of recordings is provided on the Bach-Cantatas website. Ensembles playing period instruments in historically informed performance are shown by green background.

Recordings of Brich dem Hungrigen dein Brot
Title	Conductor / Choir / Orchestra	Soloists	Label	Year	Orch. type
J. S. Bach: Cantatas BWV 39, BWV 79	Fritz Lehmann Berliner Motettenchor Berlin Philharmonic	Gunthild Weber; Lore Fischer; Hermann Schey	Archiv Produktion	1952	
J. S. Bach: Cantatas BWV 32 & BWV 39	Wolfgang Gönnenwein Süddeutscher Madrigalchor Consortium Musicum	Edith Mathis; Sybil Michelow; Franz Crass	EMI	late 1960s?	
Kodaly: Harry-Janos Suite for Orchestra; Bach: Cantata Brich dem Hungrigen dein Brot BWV 39	Diethard Hellmann Bachchor Mainz Bachorchester Mainz	Nobuko Gamo-Yamamoto; Martha Kessler; Jakob Stämpfli	SWF	late 1960s?	
Les Grandes Cantates de J.S. Bach Vol. 28	Fritz Werner Heinrich-Schütz-Chor Heilbronn Württemberg Chamber Orchestra Heilbronn	Ingeborg Reichelt; Barbara Scherler; Bruce Abel	Erato	1973	
Bach Cantatas Vol. 3 – Ascension Day, Whitsun, Trinity	Karl Richter Münchener Bach-Chor Münchener Bach-Orchester	Edith Mathis; Anna Reynolds; Dietrich Fischer-Dieskau	Archiv Produktion	1975	
J. S. Bach: Das Kantatenwerk • Complete Cantatas • Les Cantates, Folge / Vol. 3	Gustav Leonhardt Knabenchor Hannover Leonhardt-Consort	soloist of the Knabenchor Hannover; René Jacobs; Max van Egmond	Teldec	1975	Period
J. S. Bach: Cantatas	Philippe Herreweghe Collegium Vocale Gent	Agnès Mellon; Charles Brett; Peter Kooy	Virgin Classics	1991	Period
Die Bach Kantate Vol. 40	Helmuth Rilling Gächinger Kantorei Bach-Collegium Stuttgart	Arleen Auger; Gabriele Schreckenbach; Franz Gerihsen	Hänssler	1982	
Bach Edition Vol. 19 – Cantatas Vol. 10	Pieter Jan Leusink Holland Boys Choir Netherlands Bach Collegium	Ruth Holton; Sytse Buwalda; Bas Ramselaar	Brilliant Classics	2000	Period
Bach Cantatas Vol. 1: City of London / For the 1st Sunday after Trinity	John Eliot Gardiner Monteverdi Choir English Baroque Soloists	Gillian Keith; Wilke te Brummelstroete; Dietrich Henschel	Soli Deo Gloria	2000	Period
J. S. Bach: Cantatas for the First and Second Sundays After Trinity	Craig Smith chorus of Emmanuel Music orchestra of Emmanuel Music	Jayne West; Pamela Dellal; Mark McSweeney	Koch International	2001	Period
J. S. Bach: Complete Cantatas Vol. 16	Ton Koopman Amsterdam Baroque Orchestra & Choir	Johannette Zomer; Bogna Bartosz; Klaus Mertens	Antoine Marchand	2002	Period
J. S. Bach: Cantatas Vol. 45 – BWV 39, 187, 129	Masaaki Suzuki Bach Collegium Japan	Yukari Nonoshita; Robin Blaze; Peter Kooy	BIS	2009	Period

== Cited sources ==
Manuscript, published editions and translations

- "Brich dem Hungrigen dein Brot, BWV 39; BC A 96". Bach Digital. 2026.
- West, John E., ed. (1907). Give the hungry man thy bread (vocal score). Translated by Paul England. Novello & Co.
- Leisinger, Ulrich, ed. (1999). Brich dem Hungrigen dein Brot / Give the hungry ones thy bread (PDF) (vocal score, arranged by Paul Horn). Stuttgarter Bach-Ausgaben • Urtext. Translated by Henry Drinker; revised by Gordon Paine. Carus-Verlag.
- Dürr, Alfred; Freeman, Robert; Webster, James, eds. (2011). Brich dem Hungrigen dein Brot / Break with hungry men thy bread (vocal score, arranged by Joachim Eichorn). Bärenreiter Urtext. Bärenreiter. ISMN 979-0-00-654144-7.
- Browne, Francis (2005). "Kommt, laßt euch den Herren lehren". Bach-Cantatas.
- Drinker, Henry Sandwith (1942). Texts of the choral works of Johann Sebastian Bach in English translation by Bach, Johann Sebastian, 1685–1750, Volume I. Association of American Colleges. pp. 83–85.
- Terry, Charles Sanford (1926). Bach Cantata Texts, Sacred and Secular With a Reconstruction of the Leipzig Liturgy of His Period. Constable.

Books and journal articles

- Cantagrel, Gilles (2010). Les cantates de J.-S.Bach : textes, traductions, commentaires (in French). Fayard. ISBN 978-2-21-366075-2.
- Dürr, Alfred; Jones, Richard D. P. (2006). "Brich dem Hungrigen dein Brot, BWV 39". The Cantatas of J. S. Bach: With Their Librettos in German-English Parallel Text. Oxford University Press. pp. 392–397. ISBN 978-0-19-929776-4.
- Gérold, Théodore, ed. (1921). "Chanson XVII: Ne l'oseray je dire". Le manuscrit de Bayeux: texte et musique d'un recueil de chansons du XVe siècle (in French). Strasbourg: Librairie Istra. p. 18.
- Jones, Richard D. P. (2013). The Creative Development of Johann Sebastian Bach, Volume II: 1717–1750: Music to Delight the Spirit. Oxford University Press. ISBN 978-0-19-150384-9.
- Küster, Konrad (1999). "Brich dem Hungrigen dein Brot, BWV 39". In Boyd, Malcolm (ed.). J. S. Bach. Composer Companions (1st ed.). Oxford University Press. ISBN 0198662084.
- Pirro, André (2014). The Aesthetic of Johann Sebastian Bach. Translated by Joe Armstrong. Rowman & Littlefield. ISBN 978-1-44-223291-4.
- Riemenschneider, Albert (1950). The Use of Flutes in the Works of J. S. Bach. Washington, D.C.: Library of Congress.
- Robertson, Alec (1972). The Church Cantatas of Johann Sebastian Bach. Cassell.
- Ruëtz, Manfred (1935). "Die Blockflöte in der Kirchenmusik Johann Sebastian Bachs". Musik und Kirche. 7: 112–120. ISSN 0027-4771.
- Schmidt, Lloyd (1964). "Bach and the recorder" (PDF). The American Recorder. 5: 30–36.
- Schulze, Hans-Joachim (1989). "Johann Sebastian Bach's orchestra: some unanswered questions". Early Music. XVII: 3–16. doi:10.1093/earlyj/XVII.1.3.
- Schweitzer, Albert (1911). J.S. Bach, Volume II. Translated by Ernest Newman. Breitkopf & Härtel.
- Sharp, N.E.O. (1975). "The use of flutes and recorders in the church cantatas of Johann Sebastian Bach". Eastman School of Music, University of Rochester.
- Simpson, Adrienne (1995). "The orchestral recorder". In John Mansfield Thomson; Anthony Rowland-Jones (eds.). The Cambridge Companion to the Recorder. Cambridge University Press. pp. 91–106. ISBN 978-0-52-135816-3.
- Spitta, Philipp (1899). Johann Sebastian Bach : his work and influence on the music of Germany, 1685–1750, Vol. III. Translated by Clara Bell; J. E. Fuller Maitland. Novello & Co.
- Terry, Charles Sanford (1932). Bach's orchestra. Oxford University Press.
- Whittaker, William Gillies (1959). The Cantatas of Johann Sebastian Bach: sacred and secular, Volume I. Oxford University Press. pp. 688–697.
- Wolff, Christoph (1991). Bach: Essays on his Life and Music. Harvard University Press. ISBN 978-0-67-405926-9.
- Wolff, Christoph (2002). Johann Sebastian Bach: The Learned Musician. Oxford University Press. ISBN 0-19-924884-2.
- Zedler, Günther (2009). Die erhaltenen Kantaten Johann Sebastian Bachs (Spätere Sakrale- und Weltliche Werke): Besprechungen in Form von Analysen – Erklärungen – Deutungen (in German). Perfect Paperback. pp. 131–135. ISBN 978-3-83-913773-4.
- Zedler, Günther (2011). Die Kantaten von Johann Sebastian Bach: Eine Einführung in die Werkgattung (in German). BoD – Books on Demand. ISBN 978-3-84-235725-9.
- "Meininger Kantatentexte um Johann Ludwig Bach". Bach-Jahrbuch. 73: 159–164. 1987.

CD liner notes

- Gardiner, John Eliot (2004). "Cantatas for the First Sunday after Trinity / St Giles Cripplegate, London" (PDF). p. 5 – via Bach Cantatas.
- Hofmann, Klaus (2009), Brich dem Hungrigen dein Brot, BWV 39 / To deal thy bread to the hungry (PDF), pp. 5–6 – via Bach Cantatas
- Schulze, Hans-Joachim (2024). "Brich dem Hungrigen dein Brot BWV 39 / BC A 96". Commentaries to the Cantatas of Johann Sebastian Bach. Translated by Brokaw, James A. University of Illinois Library.

Other

- Bischof, Walter F. (2015). "BWV 39 Brich dem Hungrigen dein Brot". University of Alberta.
- Dahn, Luke (2016). "Tabulation of Bach's chorales". Archived from the original on 7 May 2016.
- Dahn, Luke (2026). "BWV 39.7". bach-chorales.com.
- Dellal, Pamela (2026). "BWV 39 – "Brich dem Hungrigen dein Brot"". Emmanuel Music.
- Mincham, Julian (2010). "Chapter 17 Bwv 39 – The Cantatas of Johann Sebastian Bach". jsbachcantatas.com.
- Oron, Aryeh (2026). "Cantata BWV 39 Brich dem Hungrigen dein Brot". Bach Cantatas.
- "Bruegel's "Sermon of St John the Baptist"". Google Arts & Culture (Captioned slide-show). 2026.
- "Chorale Melodies used in Bach's Vocal Works / Freu dich sehr, o meine Seele". Bach Cantatas. 2011.
