= Margot Guilleaume =

German operatic soprano (1910–2004)

- Born: 12 January 1910; Hamburg, Germany
- Died: 25 June 2004 (aged 94); Hamburg, Germany
- Education: Vogt'sches Konservatorium
- Occupations: Classical operatic soprano; Academic voice teacher
- Organizations: Hamburg State Opera; Musikhochschule Hamburg

Margot Guilleaume (12 January 1910 – 25 June 2004) was a German operatic soprano, a member of the Hamburg State Opera. She was an academic teacher at the Musikhochschule Hamburg from 1950 to 1978, and was known beyond Germany as a singer in oratorio and concert.

== Career ==
Born in Hamburg to a family that had moved from Brittany in 1789, she first was a commercial apprentice. She passed the exam to enter the Vogt'sches Konservatorium, and was trained for two years to be an opera choir singer. From 1931, she was a member of the choir of the Schilleroper in Hamburg. She studied voice privately with Lilli Schmitt de Georgi. In 1933, she was engaged at the Theater Lübeck as Chormitglied mit Soloverpflichtung (choir member with solo duties). She was a member of the chorus of the Bayreuth Festival in 1934 and was engaged at the Hamburg State Opera for smaller solo parts in 1936. In 1937 she suffered from a severe traffic accident. She recovered, and was able to step in as Queen of the Night in Mozart's Die Zauberflöte at the Deutsches Theater Göttingen, which gained her an engagement there, followed by the Theater Wilhelmshaven and the Oldenburgisches Staatstheater, where she performed major roles such as Konstanze in Mozart's Die Entführung aus dem Serail, Zerbinetta in Ariadne auf Naxos by Richard Strauss, Micaela in Bizet's Carmen, Mimi in Puccini's La Bohème and Nedda in Leoncavallo's Pagliacci.

After World War II, Guilleaume sang at the Hamburgische Staatsoper from 1946 to 1949. She was a soloist in radio concerts and recordings of Radio Hamburg, the later Norddeutscher Rundfunk (NDR) which made her known and led to concerts and recordings for the labels Polydor and Deutsche Grammophon. She performed Lieder all over Germany and in neighbouring countries, especially in France.

In 1948, she performed the part of Marzelline in Beethoven's Fidelio in a complete live recording but without dialogue, with Hans Schmidt-Isserstedt conducting radio choir and orchestra in Hamburg. The same year, she recorded the title role in Verdi's La Traviata in German, conducted by Hans Müller-Kray. In 1950 she recorded the title role of Mozart's Die Gärtnerin aus Liebe in a complete recording conducted by Rolf Reinhardt. The same year, she was Nedda in a recording of Pagliacci, and Anna in Marschner's Hans Heiling, both with Wilhelm Schüchter conducting the Hamburg radio forces. In 1951, she recorded, again with Reinhardt, the part Mlle. Silberklang in Mozart's Der Schauspieldirektor. In 1952, she was Juliette in a recording of Korngold's Die tote Stadt, conducted by Fritz Lehmann. She sang in 1955 in a complete recording of Monteverdi's L'Orfeo the parts of Musica and Proserpina. August Wenzinger conducted the orchestra of the festival Sommerliche Musiktage Hitzacker, and singers included Helmut Krebs in the title role, Jeanne Deroubaix as Speranza and Messagera, and Fritz Wunderlich as Apollo in his first studio recording.

Guilleaume was a lecturer at the Musikhochschule Hamburg from 1950. In 1962, she was appointed professor. She retired from the post in 1978.
