= Helmut Krebs =

German tenor

Helmut Krebs (October 8, 1913 in Dortmund – August 30, 2007 in Berlin) was a German tenor in opera and concert, who sang a wide range of roles from Baroque to contemporary works.

== Professional career ==
Krebs studied at the Dortmund Conservatory and the Berlin Musikhochschule with Paul Luhmann, and later privately with Max Meili. He began singing in concert in 1937 and made his stage debut at the Volksoper Berlin in 1938, but the war interrupted his career. He resumed his career in 1945 in Düsseldorf, and joined the Berlin State Opera in 1947, where he was to remain for some 40 years.

He quickly established himself in lyric roles in German and Italian repertoire such as Belmonte, Tamino, Idamante, Ferrando, Nemorino, Ernesto, Fenton, David, Chateauneuf, he also enjoyed success in German operettas, notably as Alfred in Die Fledermaus, etc.

He also took part in creation of contemporary works such as Henze's Konig Hirsch, Arnold Schoenberg's Moses und Aron, Carl Orff's Antigonae, also singing as Albert in Rolf Liebermann's Leonore 40-45, the title role in Igor Stravinsky's Oedipus Rex, and Pelléas in Debussy's Pelléas et Mélisande.

He was also an admired recitalist of Lieder and Bach's oratorios, especially noted as the Evangelist. In the 1950s, he began exploring ancient music and became a noted interpreter of Monteverdi's L'Orfeo, where his evenly controlled technique, wide vocal range, expressive declamation and highly individual timbre were shown to great effect.

Krebs made guest appearances at the Munich State Opera, the Vienna State Opera, La Scala in Milan, and the Royal Opera House in London and the Glyndebourne Festival Opera. He began teaching at the Berlin Musikhochsule in 1957, and at the Frankfurt Musikhochschule in 1966. He was made a Kammersänger in 1963.

== Selected recordings ==
- 1951 - Gluck - Iphigenie in Aulis - Martha Musial, Helmut Krebs, Johanna Blatter, Dietrich Fischer-Dieskau, Josef Greindl - RIAS Kammerchor und Sinfonieorchester, Artur Rother - Gala (sung in German)
- 1955 - Monteverdi - L'Orfeo - Helmut Krebs, Hanni Mack-Cosak, Margot Guilleaume, Fritz Wunderlich, Horst Günter, Peter Rot-Ehrang - Sommerliche Musiktage Hitzacker, August Wenzinger - Cantus Classics
- 1957 - Monteverdi - Vespro della Beata Vergine - Maria Stader, Hertha Töpper, Marga Höffgen, Helmut Krebs, Richard Holm, Walter Berry - Bavarian Radio Chorus and Orchestra, Eugen Jochum
- 1954 - Verdi - Requiem, with RIAS Symphony Orchestra - Ferenc Fricsay (DGG)
- 1955-56 - Bach - Christmas Oratorio - Gunthild Weber, Sieglinde Wagner, Helmut Krebs as Evangelist, Heinz Rehfuss - Berliner Motettenchor, Berliner Philarmoniker - dir. Fritz Lehmann, Günther Arndt (DGG, Archiv Produktion)
- 1960 - Mozart - Requiem, with Grümmer, Pitzinger, Hotter, Ferenc Fricsay (DGG)

== Selected filmography ==
- The Merry Wives of Windsor (1950)

== Sources ==
- Grove Music Online, Nicholas Anderson, May 2008
