= Lore Fischer =

German alto (1911–1991)

Lore Fischer (27 May 1911 – 16 October 1991) was a German alto, a concert singer who recorded Bach cantatas with Fritz Lehmann.
