= Konrad Küster =

German musicologist

Konrad Küster (born 11 March 1959) is a German musicologist.

Born in Stuttgart, Küster studied musicology, Medieval and Modern History and Comparative Regional Studies at the Eberhard Karls University Tübingen and received his doctorate in 1989 with a thesis on the design of the first movements in Mozart's concerts (Kassel 1991). In 1993 he habilitated in Freiburg with the thesis Opus primum in Venice - tradition of the vocal movement, 1590-1650. Since 1995 he has been professor of musicology at the Albert-Ludwigs-University of Freiburg. From 1995 to 1997 he was dean, and from 2002 to 2006 dean of studies. From 2003 to 2018 he was a member of the board of the International Heinrich Schütz Society.

Küster's spectrum of research covers a wide range from the music of the Middle Ages to the Protestant musical culture of the 16th to 19th centuries (especially Heinrich Schütz and Johann Sebastian Bach) and on to First Viennese School. He became known as the editor of the Bach Handbook A main focus of his work is music in northern Central Europe, especially organ culture in the marshes on the North Sea. In connection with the Evangelical Lutheran Church in Northern Germany, he conceived the touring exhibition "Organs at the North Sea - Culture of the Marshes" in 2013. Since 2013 he has published the series of sheet music "Music between the North Sea and the Baltic Sea".

== Publications ==
- Mozart. Eine musikalische Biographie. Deutsche Verlags-Anstalt, Stuttgart 1990, ISBN 3-421-06572-1 (several editions).
- Opus Primum in Venedig. Traditionen des Vokalsatzes 1590–1650 (Freiburger Beiträge zur Musikwissenschaft. Vol. 4). Laaber-Verlag, Laaber 1995, ISBN 3-89007-303-4 Habilitation essay.
- Der junge Bach. Deutsche Verlags-Anstalt, Stuttgart 1996, ISBN 3-421-05052-X.
- as editor: Bach-Handbuch. Bärenreiter, Kassel among others 1999, ISBN 3-7618-2000-3.
- W. A. Mozart und seine Zeit. Laaber-Verlag, Laaber 2001, ISBN 3-921518-92-X.
- Im Umfeld der Orgel. Musik und Musiker zwischen Elbe und Weser (Schriften der Orgelakademie Stade. VOl. 2). Orgelakademie, Stade 2007, ISBN 978-3-931879-33-4.
- als Herausgeber: Zwischen Schütz und Bach. Georg Österreich und Heinrich Bokemeyer als Notensammler (Gottorf / Wolfenbüttel). Carus, Stuttgart 2015, ISBN 978-3-89948-245-4.
- Orgeln an der Nordsee – Kultur der Marschen. Ludwig, Kiel 2015, ISBN 978-3-86935-245-9 (several editions).
- Musik im Namen Luthers. Kulturtraditionen seit der Reformation. Bärenreiter among others Kassel etc. 2016, ISBN 978-3-7618-2381-1.
- Arp Schnitger. Orgelbauer – Klangarchitekt – Vordenker. Ludwig, Kiel 2019, ISBN 978-3-86935-358-6.
