= August Wenzinger =

Swiss musician, conductor

August Wenzinger (14 November 1905 - 25 December 1996) was a prominent cellist, viol player, conductor, teacher, and music scholar from Basel, Switzerland. He was a pioneer of historically informed performance, both as a master of the viola da gamba and as a conductor of Baroque orchestral music and operas.

Wenzinger received his basic musical training at the Basel Conservatory, then went on to study cello with Paul Grümmer and music theory with Philipp Jarnach at the Hochschule für Musik in Cologne. He then took private cello lessons with Emanuel Feuermann in Berlin. Wenzinger served as first cellist in the Bremen City Orchestra (1929–1934) and the Basel Allgemeine Musikgesellschaft (1936–1970).

By 1925 Wenzinger had mastered the viola da gamba, an instrument then usually considered obsolete. He joined the Kabeler Kammermusik (Kabel Chamber Music), a circle of musicians interested in authentic Baroque performance, sponsored by paper manufacturer Hans Eberhard Hoesch in Hagen, Germany. In 1930 he and flautist Gustav Scheck also founded the Kammermusikkreis Scheck-Wenzinger (Scheck-Wenzinger Chamber Music Circle), considered the leading early music ensemble until the 1950s.

In 1933 Wenzinger assumed the leadership of the Kabeler Kammermusik, but the group was soon phased out under political pressure. Wenzinger moved to Basel the same year to accept an appointment to teach cello and viola da gamba at the newly founded Schola Cantorum Basiliensis.

Wenzinger was one of the first musicians to make recordings with the viola da gamba. In 1968, together with the noted Swiss viola da gamba player Hannelore Mueller, he founded the Schola Cantorum Basiliensis viola da gamba trio. He taught many acclaimed violists, including Jordi Savall, who succeeded him in 1974 as professor of viola da gamba, and Hannelore Mueller who succeeded him as professor of viola da gamba and baroque cello, at the Schola Cantorum Basiliensis. Wenzinger also taught at Harvard and Brandeis universities in the United States. In 1960 he received an honorary doctorate from the University of Basel.

Wenzinger was also an acclaimed conductor, and in 1949 he led a recording of the Brandenburg Concertos performed on original instruments for the Archiv record label. From 1954 to 1958 he led the Capella Coloniensis, the baroque orchestra of West German Radio in Cologne. In 1955 Wenzinger directed this orchestra in one of the first recordings of the opera L'Orfeo by Claudio Monteverdi. He led performances of Baroque operas at Herrenhausen in Hanover, Germany, from 1958 to 1966.

Wenzinger’s publications include Gambenübung, a method book in two volumes for the viola da gamba (1935, 1938), and Gambenfibel, a primer for the viola da gamba (1943). He edited Bach’s unaccompanied cello suites in 1950 for Bärenreiter, an edition which remains a best seller for the publisher and among the most widely used by performers, and several Baroque operas.
