= Gunthild Weber =

German soprano

Gunthild Weber (1909 – ?) was a German soprano, a concert singer who sang lieder and music by Bach.

== Discography ==
Her Bach recordings are notable: cantatas with various conductors; the Mass in B minor (1953) with Fritz Lehmann, and the Christmas Oratorio (1955/56) with Lehmann and her husband Gunther Arndt.
