= Fritz Lehmann =

German conductor (1904–1956)

- Fritz Lehmann, in the 1940s
- Born: 17 May 1904; Mannheim, Germany
- Died: 30 March 1956 (aged 51); Munich, Germany
- Occupation: Conductor
- Organizations: Berliner Motettenchor

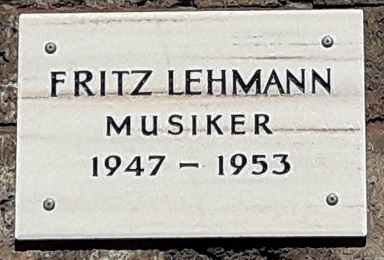
Göttinger Gedenktafel - Lehmann, Fritz

Fritz Lehmann (17 May 1904 – 30 March 1956) was a noted German conductor, whose career was cut short by his early death at the age of 51. His repertoire ranged from the Baroque through to contemporary works, in both the concert hall and the opera house. He was an early advocate of period performance practice. and founded the Berliner Motettenchor. He is best known through a number of recordings he left.

== Biography ==
Fritz Ludwig Lehmann was born in Mannheim, the son of an organist and choirmaster. He studied at the Hochschule für Musik there from 1918 to 1921, and at the Universities of Heidelberg and Göttingen. He made his professional debut as a pianist in 1918.

He conducted at Göttingen (1923-1927), firstly as choirmaster and later as conductor of the Municipal Theatre. In Essen he was head of the classes for opera and orchestra at the Folkwangschule. He also conducted in Hildesheim and Hanover until 1938. In 1934, he became conductor of the Göttingen International Handel Festival, where he conducted the first modern production of Handel's Tolomeo, on 19 June 1938. He resigned after conflict with the Nazi authorities in 1944.

Lehmann was Generalmusikdirektor in Bad Pyrmont (1934-1938), and Wuppertal (1938-1947). He returned to the Göttingen International Handel Festival in 1946, remaining there until 1953. On 29 June 1947 he led the first modern production of Handel's Teseo.

Recording 6 cantatas by Johann Sebastian Bach he conducted the Berliner Motettenchor (Berlin Motet Choir), a 1949 by Günther Arndt founded mixed youth choir, with the Berlin Philharmonic and soloists including Helmut Krebs and Dietrich Fischer-Dieskau, who also appeared in his 1949 recording of the St Matthew Passion for Les Discophiles Français, as the Evangelist and Vox Christi (voice of Christ).

From 1953, he taught at the Munich Hochschule für Musik und Theater. He simultaneously had an active career as a guest conductor in various European countries and Argentina, and led the Bamberg Symphony on a tour of Spain.

During the interval while conducting the St Matthew Passion in Munich, on Good Friday, 30 March 1956, Lehmann collapsed and died of a heart attack, aged only 51. Another conductor took over for the second half, the audience not being informed of Lehmann's death until the end of the performance. Lehmann had begun to record Bach's Christmas Oratorio with the Berliner Motettenchor and the RIAS Kammerchor, the Berlin Philharmonic and soloists Gunthild Weber, Sieglinde Wagner, Helmut Krebs and Heinz Rehfuss in 1955. It was unfinished when he died; Günther Arndt conducted parts 5 and 6 in 1956.

== Recordings ==
External audio
- Recordings with Fritz Lehmann in the Online Archive of the Österreichische Mediathek

Fritz Lehmann's recordings include:

- J.S. Bach:
  - Cantatas BWV 1, 4, 19, 21, 39, 56, 79, 82, 105, 170, 189
  - Mass in B minor
  - St Matthew Passion
  - St John Passion
  - Christmas Oratorio
- Brahms: A German Requiem
- Corelli: Concerto Grosso No. 1
- Georg Friedrich Handel:
  - Water Music 1951 <Archiv Produktion APM 14006>
  - Music for the Royal Fireworks 1952 <Archiv Produktion 13012 AP>
- Joseph Haydn<Deutsche Grammophon 18397>
  - Symphony No.45, F sharp minor
- Humperdinck: Hänsel und Gretel (with Rita Streich, Munich Philharmonic)
- Korngold: Die tote Stadt (recorded September 1952)
- Mendelssohn:
  - Piano Concerto No.1 in G minor, Op.25 (Bamberger Symphoniker; Helmut Roloff, piano; recorded: May 1952)
  - Piano Concerto No.2 in D minor, Op.40 (Bamberger Symphoniker; Helmut Roloff, piano; recorded: May 1952)
- Mozart:
  - Piano Concerto in D major, "Coronation", K. 537 (Berlin Philharmonic; Carl Seemann, piano)
  - Concert Rondo in D major, K. 382 (Bamberg Symphony, Carl Seemann)
- Schubert: Music for Rosamunde and Die Zauberharfe
