= List of Latin phrases =

This is a list of Wikipedia articles of Latin phrases and their translation into English.

To view all phrases on a single, lengthy document, see: List of Latin phrases (full).

== Lists of pages ==
- List of Latin phrases (A)
- List of Latin phrases (B)
- List of Latin phrases (C)
- List of Latin phrases (D)
- List of Latin phrases (E)
- List of Latin phrases (F)
- List of Latin phrases (G)
- List of Latin phrases (H)
- List of Latin phrases (I)
- List of Latin phrases (L)
- List of Latin phrases (M)
- List of Latin phrases (N)
- List of Latin phrases (O)
- List of Latin phrases (P)
- List of Latin phrases (Q)
- List of Latin phrases (R)
- List of Latin phrases (S)
- List of Latin phrases (T)
- List of Latin phrases (U)
- List of Latin phrases (V)

== See also ==
- Latin influence in English
- Latinism
- Latin tag

=== Lists ===
- List of abbreviations used in medical prescriptions
- List of ecclesiastical abbreviations
- List of Germanic and Latinate equivalents in English
- List of Greek phrases
- List of Greek and Latin roots in English
- List of Latin abbreviations
- List of Latin and Greek words commonly used in systematic names
- List of Latin words with English derivatives
- List of Latin legal terms
- List of medical roots, suffixes and prefixes
- List of sundial mottos § Latin mottos
- List of U.S. state and territory mottos
- List of university and college mottos

=== Categories ===
- Ancient Roman names
- Dog Latin words and phrases
- Latin biological phrases
- Latin legal terms
- Latin literary phrases
- Latin logical phrases
- Latin medical words and phrases
- Latin mottos
- Latin philosophical phrases
- Latin political words and phrases
- Latin religious words and phrases
