= Schema for horizontal dials =

Set of instructions used to construct horizontal sundials

A schema for horizontal dials is a set of instructions used to construct horizontal sundials using compass and straightedge construction techniques, which were widely used in Europe from the late fifteenth century to the late nineteenth century. The common horizontal sundial is a geometric projection of an equatorial sundial onto a horizontal plane.

The special properties of the polar-pointing gnomon (axial gnomon) were first known to the Moorish astronomer Abdul Hassan Ali in the early thirteenth century and this led the way to the dial-plates, with which we are familiar, dial plates where the style and hour lines have a common root.

Through the centuries artisans have used different methods to markup the hour lines sundials using the methods that were familiar to them, in addition the topic has fascinated mathematicians and become a topic of study. Graphical projection was once commonly taught, though this has been superseded by trigonometry, logarithms, sliderules and computers which made arithmetical calculations increasingly trivial/ Graphical projection was once the mainstream method for laying out a sundial but has been sidelined and is now only of academic interest.

The first known document in English describing a schema for graphical projection was published in Scotland in 1440, leading to a series of distinct schema for horizontal dials each with characteristics that suited the target latitude and construction method of the time.

== Context ==
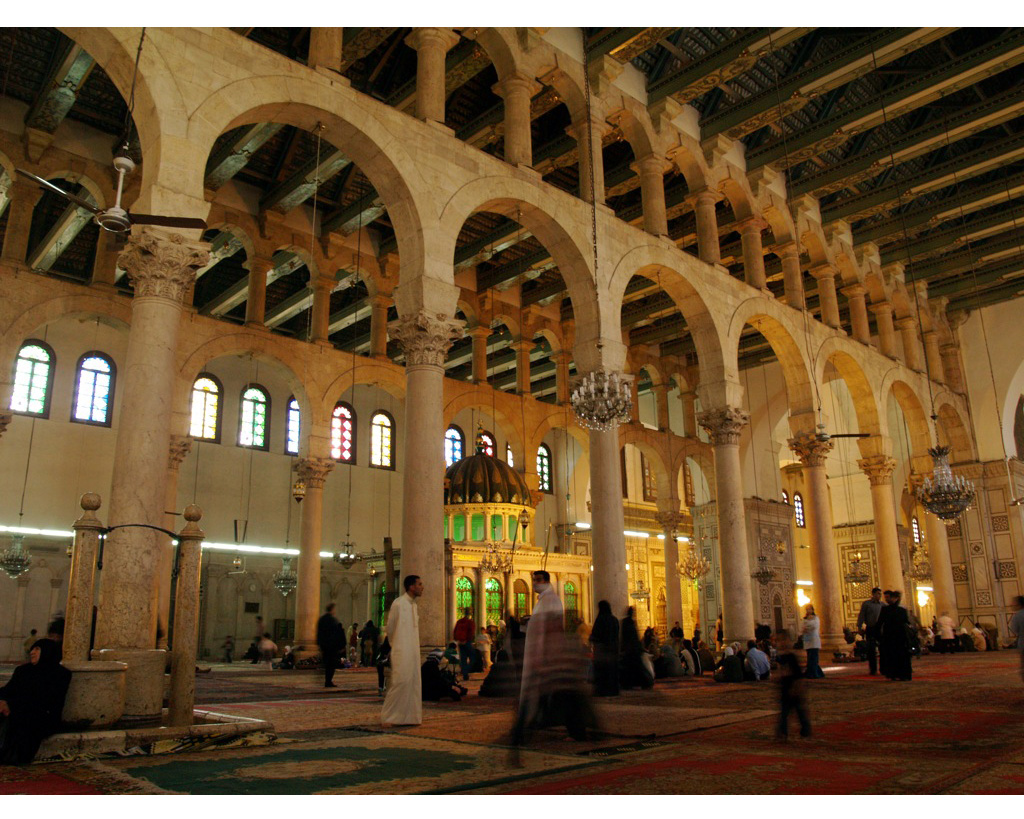
Umayyad Mosque, also known as the Grand Mosque of Damascus

The art of sundial design is to produce a dial that accurately displays local time. Sundial designers have also been fascinated by the mathematics of the dial and possible new ways of displaying the information. Modern dialling started in the tenth century when Arab astronomers made the great discovery that a gnomon parallel to the Earth's axis will produce sundials whose hour lines show equal hours or legal hours on any day of the year: the dial of Ibn al-Shatir in the Umayyad Mosque in Damascus is the oldest dial of this type. (Note: Time had been measured by dividing the daylight hours by twelve using unequal hours, known as Italian hours or Babylonian hours.) Dials of this type appeared in Austria and Germany in the 1440s.

A dial plate can be laid out, by a pragmatic approach, observing and marking a shadow at regular intervals throughout the day on each day of the year. If the latitude is known the dial plate can be laid out using geometrical construction techniques which rely on projection geometry, or by calculation using the known formulas and trigonometric tables usually using logarithms, or slide rules or more recently computers or mobile phones. Linear algebra has provided a useful language to describe the transformations.

A sundial schema uses a compass and a straight edge to firstly to derive the essential angles for that latitude, then to use this to draw the hourlines on the dial plate. In modern terminology this would mean that graphical techniques were used to derive $\sin x$ and $m\tan y$ and from it $\sin x .\tan y$. (Note: The British Sundial Society publishes a glossary of computer terms and the symbols that are commonly used to represent them. Latitude is represented by phi,$\phi$ or φ or Φ.)

=== Basic calculation ===
- Using a large sheet of paper.
- Starting at the bottom a horizontal line is drawn, and a vertical one up the centre. Where they cross is becomes the origin O, the foot of the Gnomon.
- A horizontal line draw a line which fixes the size of the dial. Where it crosses the centre line is an important construction point F
- A construction line is drawn upwards from O at the angle of latitude. (Note: All dials in these illustrations use a latitude of 52°, it was chosen randomly but is roughly that of Bletchley Park, The Hague or Bielefeld.)
- Using a square, (drop a line) a line from F through the construction line is drawn so they cross at right angles. That point E, is an important construction point. To be precise it is the line FE that is important as it is length $\sin\phi$.
- Using compasses, or dividers the length FE was copied upwards in the centre line from F. The new construction point is called G The construction lines and FE are erased.
Setting out a dial for 52°N. The three initial lines.

Marking the latitude, laying out length $\sin\phi$, and copying to G on the vertical.

A tangent:Laying out the length $\tan\theta$

A tangent of a sine: Laying out lines of length $\sin\phi\tan h$, where h is an integer 0 .. 5

Such geometric constructions were well known and remained part of the high school (UK grammar school) curriculum until the New Maths revolution in the 1970s.

The schema shown above was used in 1525 (from an earlier work 1440) by Dürer is still used today. The simpler schema were more suitable for dials designed for the lower latitudes, requiring a narrow sheet of paper for the construction, than those intended for the higher latitudes. This prompted the quest for other constructions.

== Horizontal dials ==
The first part of the process is common to many methods. It establishes a point on the north south line that is sin φ from the meridian line.

=== Early Scottish method (1440) Dürer (1525) Rohr (1965) ===
- Start with the basic method shown above
- From G a series of lines, 15° apart are drawn, long enough so they cross the line through F. These mark the hour points 1, 2, 3 4, 5 and 7, 8, 9, 10, 11.
- The centre of the dial is at the bottom, point O. The line drawn from each of these hour point to O will be the hour line on the finished dial.

The significant problem is the width of the paper needed in the higher latitudes.

Setting out a dial for 52°N. The three initial lines.

Marking the latitude, laying out length $\sin\phi$, and copying to G on the vertical.

=== Benedetti (1574) ===
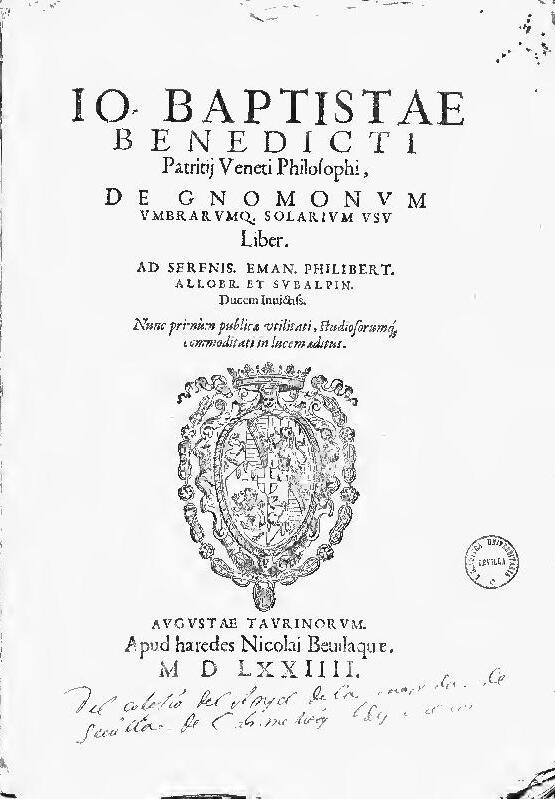
De gnomonum umbrarumque solarium usu

Giambattista Benedetti, an impoverished nobleman worked as a mathematician at the court of Savola. His book which describes this method was De gnomonum umbrarumque solarium usu published in 1574. It describes a method for displaying the legal hours, that is equal hours as we use today, while most people still used unequal hours which divided the hours of daylight into 12 equal hours- but they would change as the year progressed. Benedettis method divides the quadrant into 15° segments. Two construction are made: a parallel horizontal line that defines the tan h distances, and a gnomonic polar line GT which represents sin φ.

- Draw a quadrant GRB, with 15° segments. GR is horizontal.
- A parallel horizontal line is drawn from PE, and ticks made where it bisects the 15° rays.
- GX is the latitude. T is the crossing point with PE. GTE is the gnomonic triangle.
- The length GT is copied to the bottom of E giving the point F.
- The hour lines are drawn from F, and the dial is complete.

Benedetti included instructions for drawing a point gnomon so unequal hours could be plotted.

Quadrant with 15° segments.

constructing the rays.

Finding the origin.

Adding the hour lines.

Dial face.

=== Clavius method (1586) ===
(Fabica et usus instrumenti ad horologiorum descriptionem.) Rome Italy.

The Clavius method looks at a quarter of the dial. It views the horizontal and the perpendicular plane to the polar axis as two rectangles hinged around the top edge of both dials. the polar axis will be at φ degrees to the polar axis, and the hour lines will be equispaced on the polar plane an equatorial dial. (15°). Hour points on the polar plane will connect to the matching point on the horizontal plane. The horizontal hour lines are plotted to the origin.

- Draw the gnomonic triangle, lying on its hypotenuse.
- On the small side, draw a (equatorial) square, with 15° hour markings.
- The dial plate is constructed with compasses taking it sizes from the triangle.
- The hour lines 12, 3, and 6 are known. The hour lines 1 and 2 are taken from the side of the square.
- A diagonal is taken from 12 to 6, and lines parallel to this drawn through 1 and 2, giving 5 and 4
- The morning dial is a reflection of this.

=== Stirrup's method (1652) ===
- From G a series of lines, 15° apart are drawn, long enough so they cross the line through F. These mark the hour points 9, 10, 11, 12, 1, 2, 3.
- The centre of the dial is at the bottom, point O. The line drawn from each of these hour point to O will be the hour line on the finished dial.

Setting out a dial for 52°N. The three initial lines.

Marking the latitude, laying out length $\sin\phi$, and copying to G on the vertical.

From G casting $\tan h \sin\phi$ on the horizontal.

The actual hour lines 9, 10, 11, 12, 1, 2, 3.

Construction lines removed.

Finding the angle for 4 and 5.

Drawing 4 and 5.

Construction lines removed. The completed dial plate for 52°N. Stirrup (1652)

=== Bettini method (1660) ===
The Jesuit Mario Bettini penned a method which was posthumously published in the book Recreationum Mathematicarum Apiaria Novissima 1660.

- Draw the gnomonic triangle with the hypotenuse against the meridian line, and φ to the bottom, C. The other point call M, the right angle call G.
- A horizontal line is drawn through M, this is the equinoctial
- A circle centred an M with a radius MG is drawn. G2 and G3 are the intersections of the circle and meridian.
- In the top quadrants, points are marked each 30°. Two are named P, Q.
- Construction lines are drawn from G2 and G3 through P and Q- the intersections with the equinoctial are marked.
- To finish the hourlines are drawn through these points from C, and the dial squared off.

Bettini's Method 1660

Gnomonic triangle

Circle marked each 30°

Construction Lines

Hour lines drawn to the origin

The dial plate

=== Leybourn (1669) ===
William Leybourn published his "Art of Dialling" (Note: The Art of Dialling : Performed Geometrically, by Scale and Compasses: Arithmetically, by the Canons of Sines and Tangents: Instrumentally, by a Trigonal Instrument ...; To which is added A Supplement; Shewing, How by Scale and Compasses to inscribe such Circles of the Sphere into Sun-Dial-Plans, that shall shew (besides the hour of the day) the Diurnal Motion of the Sun ...) in 1669, a with it a six-stage method. His description relies heavily on the term line of chords, for which a modern diallist substitutes a protractor. The line of chords was a scale found on the sector which was used in conjunction with a set of dividers or compasses. It was still used by navigators up to the end of the 19th century. (Note: The line of chords is available on a builders metal rule (Stanley 60R Line of Chords Rule) in 2015.)

- Draw a circle, and its two cardinal diameters: E–W, and S–N (top to bottom). O is their crossing point or origin.
- Using a scale of chords or protractor, lay off two lines, "0a" that is 52° from OS, and "0b" that is 52° from OW. (they will be at right angles. The points "a" and "b" are important.
- With a straight edge draw a line connect E with "a", it cuts SN (the meridian line) at P, which is called the pole of the world. Now connect E to "a", it connects AE. This point is important as it is where the meridian crosses the equinoctial circle. The points E, AE, and W lie on the equinoctial circle. The next task is to use this information to locate the centre and to draw the circle. Use a construction line to join AE and W. At the centre point, raise a line at right angles. Where it cuts the SN (the meridian) will be C, the centre of the equinoctial circle. Use C to draw an arc from E to W, it will pass through AE.
- There is now a semicircle passing through E and W, and the equinoctial arc passing through E and W. Divide the semicircle into 12 equal parts, i.e. 15° angles. Mark with a "construction point". (Note: This can be done using the line of chords set at 60° and subdividing.)
- A ruler joins O with the points on the semicircle. These lines cut the equinoctial arc: a series of unequal points ("markers) are created.
- A ruler from P (the pole of the world) takes a line from these markers back over the semicircle. Where it cuts it will be the "hour point"; these hour points are unequally spaced.
- The hour lines are drawn from each of these "hour points" to O the origin. The origin is the foot of the style which is cut at 52°.

=== Ozanam's method (1673) Mayall (1938) ===
This method requires a far smaller piece of paper, a great advantage for higher latitudes.

- From G a series of lines, 15° apart are drawn, long enough so they cross the line through F. These mark the hour points 9, 10, 11, 12, 1, 2, 3 and represent the points $\tan h \sin\phi$.
- The centre of the dial is at the bottom, point O. The line drawn from each of these hour point to O will be the hour line on the finished dial.
- The lines through 9 and 3 are extended to the WE line and a line dropped orthogonally from 9 and 3 to the WE line, call the crossing points W' and E'. From W and E two more lines are drawn 15° apart, these cut the verticals creating the hour points 7, 8 and 4, 5. Lines taken from 0 to these hour points are the hour lines on the final dial.

Setting out a dial for 52°N. The three initial lines.

Marking the latitude, laying out length $\sin\phi$, and copying to G on the vertical.

From G casting $\tan h \sin\phi$ on the horizontal.

The actual hour lines 9, 10, 11, 12, 1, 2, 3.

Construction lines removed.

=== Encyclopedia method (1771) ===
This method uses the properties of chords to establish distance $m. \sin \theta$ in the top quadrant, and then transfers this distance into the bottom quadrant so that $\sin \phi \sin \theta$ is established. Again, a transfer of this measure to the chords in the top quadrant. The final lines establish the formula $\tan \kappa =$ $\sin\theta\sin\phi\over\cos\theta$ = $\tan\theta\sin\phi$

This is then transferred by symmetry to all quadrants. It was used in the Encyclopædia Britannica First Edition 1771, Sixth Edition 1823

- The gnomon is drawn first against the north–south line. In doing so, a diameter at φ degrees to the vertical is drawn; its reflection will also be needed.
- The circumference is marked off at 15° intervals in the top quadrants. Chords parallel to the horizontal are drawn (the length of these chords will be sin Θ.
- The measurement of each chord is transferred to form a scale along the lower radiuses. When joined these points form a series of parallel lines that are sin θ. sin φ in length.
- These measurements are transferred up to the chord.
- The final hour lines are drawn from the origins through these crossing points. ( $\tan \kappa =$ $\sin\theta\sin\phi\over\cos\theta$ = $\tan\theta\sin\phi$ )
Draw the gnomon and diameters at the target angle.

Mark the top quadrants at 15° angles, and connect with chords

Transfer the half-chord length to the lower radius, and draw across.

Raise verticals

Draw hour line through the intersections.

Resulting dial for 52°.

=== de Celles (1760) (1790) Waugh method (1973) ===
The Dom Francois Bedos de Celles method (1760) otherwise known as the Waugh method (1973)

- From G a series of lines, 15° apart are drawn, long enough so they cross the line through F. These mark the hour points 9, 10, 11, 12, 1, 2, 3 if you take just 3 and represent the points $\tan h \sin\phi$.
- The centre of the dial is at the bottom, point O. The line drawn from each of these hour point to O will be the hour line on the finished dial.
- If the paper is large enough, the method above works from 7 until 12, and 12 until 5 and the values before and after 6 are calculated through symmetry. However, there is another way of marking up 7 and 8, and 4 and 5. Call the point where 3 crosses the line R, and a drop a line at right-angles to the base line. Call that point W. Use a construction line to join W and F. Waugh calls the crossing points with the hours lines K, L, M.
- Using compasses or dividers, add two more points to this line N and P, so that the distances MN = ML, and MP = MK. The missing hour lines are drawn from O through N and through P. The construction lines are erased.
Setting out a dial for 52°N. The three initial lines.

Marking the latitude, laying out length $\sin\phi$, and copying to G on the vertical.

From G casting $\tan h \sin\phi$ on the horizontal.

The actual hour lines 9, 10, 11, 12, 1, 2, 3.

Construction lines removed.

Constructing the 7, 8, 4, 5 lines

Marking the 7, 8, 4, 5 lines

The completed dial plate for 52°N. Bedos de Celles (1790)

=== Nicholson's method (1825) ===
This method first appeared in Peter Nicholsons A popular Course of Pure and Mixed Mathematics in 1825. It was copied by School World in Jun 1903, then in Kenneth Lynch's, Sundial and Spheres 1971. It starts by drawing the well known triangle, and takes the vertices to draw two circles at radius (OB) sin φ and (AB) tan φ. The 15° lines are drawn, intersecting these circles. Lines are taken horizontally, and vertically from these circles and their intersection point (OB sin t,AB cos t) is on the hour line. That is tan κ = OB sin t/ AB cos t which resolves to sin φ. tan t.

- Draw the NS line, and the EW line crossing at the origin O. At a convenient point in the first quadrant join the axes with a line set at the target angle. This forms the basic triangle OAB.
- Set the compasses at length OB and inscribe a circle. Set the compasses on AB and inscribe a concentric circle. On both of these circles mark out the 15° angles.
- Taking the lines vertically from the inner circle, and horizontally from the outer circle, Mark each of the intersections. These are on the hour lines.
- Connect the intersection points to the origin.

The basic triangle

The circles

The 15° measure

The intersection points

The completed dial

=== Foster Serles Dialling Scales (1638) ===
- A right-angle is drawn on the dial-face and the latitude scale is laid against the x-axis.
- The target latitude point is marked across on to the dial face. The hour scale is placed from this point to the noon line (conventionally, the zero point is on the noon line).
- Each of the hour points is copied over to the dial face, and this procedure is repeated, giving the hours both sides of noon. A straight edge is used to connect these points to the origin, thus drawing the hour lines for that location.
- A vertical line from the target latitude point, and a horizontal line through the noon point will bisect at the three-hour (9am–3pm) marker.
- The style will be at the same angle as the latitude.

=== Saphea (As-Saphiah) ===
This was an early and convenient method to use if you had access to an astrolabe as many astrologers and mathematicians of the time would have had. The method involved copying the projections of the celestial sphere onto a plane surface. A vertical line was drawn with a line at the angle of the latitude drawn on the bisection of the vertical with the celestial sphere.

== See also ==
- London dial
- Schema for vertical declining dials
