= St Mark Passion (N. Matthes) =

St Mark Passion (W. N. 18) is a Passion (sacred oratorio), written in baroque style by Nikolaus Matthes (*1981) between April 2019 and April 2020. It describes the passion, death and sepulture of Jesus. It contains the entire text of chapters 14 and 15 of the Gospel of Mark.

The composer uses the libretto written by Christian Friedrich Henrici (Picander), first used by Johann Sebastian Bach for the Good Friday's service in St. Thomas Church in Leipzig in 1731. Therefore, it is the first integral setting to music of this libretto since Bach in 1731, and the first contemporary one completely following the baroque style. The piece has been first performed in March 2023 in four Swiss cities, Zurich, Bern, Basel and Lucerne.

== Genesis and sources ==
=== Relation to the passions by Johann Sebastian Bach ===
Two Passions by Johann Sebastian Bach, St John's and St Matthew's, have been passed on to our days in both text and music. A third one, St Luke's, is definitely not written by Bach.

There is a fourth one, St Mark's, of which only the text has survived; the music is completely lost. The text, written by Bach's librettist Christian Friedrich Henrici (Picander), has survived in two slightly different sources, dating to 1731 and 1744.

=== Classification of the new composition and reconstructions ===
Many musicians, scientists and musicologists have tried in various ways to «reconstruct» Bach's St Mark Passion (see St Mark Passion, BWV 247). All these versions have Picander's text as their basis and are based on the assumption that Bach, for his St Mark Passion of 1731, has re-used music which he had composed in the years before. This may be music with a similar theme or topic, or with comparable rhyme or language schemes used in other vocal works of Bach (for example, from the Trauerode, BWV 198, or the sacred cantata Widerstehe doch der Sünde, BWV 54), then re-used with the «parody» method often used by Bach in other occasions, and then matched with the text of the Passion of St Mark. In other versions, missing parts have been supplemented by new compositions; in others again, the missing parts would not be sung, but performed by a speaker. And some more versions try to match the text of St Mark with parts from Bach's St John Passion or St Matthew Passion, i. e. in recitatives of Jesus, or in Turba choruses.

There is no secure scientific insight which pieces Bach might have used for his St Mark Passion, there is also no evidence that he did so at all.

== The Piece ==
=== Disposition of the text and notation ===
St Mark Passion has, regarding its text, a different disposition than Bach's other two passions. It is immediately noticeable that the Gospel text takes up most of the space. Also very striking is the fact that there are no Ariosi in St Mark's, unlike in St John's and St Matthew's. There are only Choruses, Arias, Accompagnato Recitatives (for the words of Jesus), Secco Recitatives (for the Evangelist and the smaller solo parts) and Chorales.

The very strict order of the text always changing between the Gospel and the Chorales or the Arias is only once interrupted by an instrumental interlude (in No. 47, when Pilatus gives out Jesus' corpse to Joseph of Arimathea). This is – beside the addition of two more chorale texts in the opening and final choruses of the passion (see below) – the only divergence from Picander's libretto.

The composition follows, in all its parts, the Gospel text as well as Picander's very libretto. The notation of the text follows the libretto from 1731 (and in the two arias from the 1744 version, obviously, the libretto from 1744).

=== The two parts of the Passion ===
Both parts of the Passion («Before the Sermon» and «After the Sermon») contain the same number of pieces (see overview below). Also, both parts contain the same number of Arias and Chorales. This seems, at first glance, like a clear symmetry. But there is a very clear distinction between the two parts which is hidden in the plot line of the Gospel: In the first part, it is mostly Jesus who is speaking; the plot starts with the Anointing of Jesus in Bethany and reaches the treachery of Judas Iscariot and Jesus's capture. The second part, in contrast to the first one, is a lot in favour of the Turba choruses of the People, commenting on the plot or even acting in it themselves.

=== Chorales ===
In each of the two parts, there are eight Chorales. The high density of Chorales with a total of 16 (in comparison: in Bach's St John Passion there are 11, in his St Matthew Passion there are 13) has led to give the Chorale a very high importance as a musical form in the new composition. It has been integrated in multiple ways to enhance this form.

All Chorales are based on their traditional Chorale melodies. Some of these melodies appear several times; for example, the first choral in either parts has the same melody («Wo Gott der Herr nicht bei uns hält»). In both parts, there is one large Chorale Phantasy (No. 25, «Ich will hier bei dir stehen» – final chorus of the first part, and No. 44, «Keinen hat Gott verlassen»). Furthermore, in the opening and final Choruses of the passion, two more Chorales have been built in – as a Cantus Firmus (in No. 1, «O Traurigkeit! O Herzeleid») and as a full four-part Chorale (No. 50, «Wer nur den lieben Gott läßt walten»). The same has been done as Cantus Firmus in one of the Arias (No. 13, «Jesu, meine Freude») and in some of the Recitatives (No. 22, «Vater unser im Himmelreich», and No. 47: «Aus tiefer Not schrei ich zu dir»).

=== Arias ===
The overall eight arias are distributed to the four soloists. Each of them sings two arias, one in each part of the passion. The two tenor Arias «frame» the passion, the two alto Arias are in its middle (one of them towards the end of the first part, the second one as the opening of the second part) – another symmetry within the overall structure. Each pitch of the voice has one Aria with solo instruments and one Aria with a larger orchestral cast. The two arias from Picander's 1744 version (No. 13 and No. 36) have become the two Bass arias. (Assuming that in Bach's version of 1731 there might have been only three soloists, each of them singing two arias, this could lead to the explanation that in 1744, the two additional arias had been composed for the same pitch of voice, meaning: for a fourth soloist.)

=== Gospel; Recitatives (Evangelist and Jesus) and Turba Choruses ===
The Gospel text is, as in Bach, sung by the Evangelist (Tenor). For the first performance in 2023, two Evangelists have been engaged. This is not a choice within the composition, but within terms of performance practice: In future performances with other Ensembles, the part of the Evangelist can be easily sung by one singer only. The double cast is a trial to perform the Gospel text in dialogue form.

The words of Jesus are – as they are in Bach's St Matthew Passion – set as Accompagnato Recitatives with accompaniment by the strings.

The Turba Choruses, strictly and theatrically, follow the plot of the Gospel. They describe and concentrate in observing or dramatic manner the events from the point of view of the disciples of Jesus, the High Priests or the People.

=== Vocal Cast ===
==== Soloists ====
- Evangelist (Tenor)
- Jesus (Bass-Baritone)
- Soprano, Alto, Tenor, Bass (with 2 Arias for each pitch of the voice)

==== Soliloquents ====
- Ancilla (Soprano)
- Centurio (Tenor)
- Petrus, Judas, Pilatus, Pontifex, Miles (Baritone)

==== Choir ====
- Soprano, Alto, Tenor, Bass

=== Instrumental Cast ===
The choice was made to have a rich instrumental cast. There are – obviously – the strings, accompanied by a big Basso Continuo group, including two harpsichords, organ, lute and also bassoon, celli and double basses. Furthermore, there are two viols (for the whole passion) and two violas d'amore (for one Aria) as well as a big wind group: two traversos, two recorders and – for the whole passion – four oboes (in four versions: oboe, oboe d'amore, oboe da caccia and taille). As an additional color for the Cantus Firmus parts, as well as for a solo in an Aria (No. 46) and a Recitativo (No. 47), there is the horn (in various tunings). – The traverso (in the Tenor Aria No. 9), the violin (in the Bass Aria No. 13), the oboe da caccia (in the bass aria No 36) and the bassoon (in the Tenor Aria No 46 and in the instrumental interlude in No. 47) are used as solo instruments in crucial moments of the piece. Solo instruments appear also in duos (two oboes, in the Soprano Aria No. 19; oboe and violin, in the Soprano Aria No. 38) and as a «consort» (two violas d'amore and the two viols, in the Alto Aria no. 26).
