= St Mark Passion =

St Mark Passion refers to the Passion of Christ as told in chapters 14 and 15 of the Gospel of Mark.

It may also refer to compositions based on that text:

- Marcus-Passion spuriously attributed to Heinrich Schütz
- Historia des Leidens und Sterbens unseres Herren Jesu Christi, a 1668 St Mark Passion by Marco Giuseppe Peranda
- Jesus Christus ist um unsrer Missetat willen verwundet, a St Mark Passion attributed to composers such as Kaiser/Keiser and Brauns/Bruhns, rearranged and expanded by Johann Sebastian Bach with his own material, and in his third arrangement with some arias from George Frideric Handel's Brockes Passion, hence also known as a St Mark Passion pasticcio
- Passion according to St. Mark, one of several variant settings included in Passions (C. P. E. Bach), by Carl Philipp Emanuel Bach
- St Mark Passion composed around 1610 by Ambrosius Beber
- St Mark Passion, BWV 247, a work composed by Johann Sebastian Bach, after its score being lost surviving in several reconstructed versions
- St Mark Passion settings included in Passions (Telemann), by Georg Philipp Telemann
- Markus-Passion, Gottfried August Homilius
- Markus-Passion, Adolf Brunner
- Markus-Passion, Jacob de Haan
- Markus-Passion, Kurt Thomas
- Markuspassion, Nikolaus Matthes; first integral setting to music of Picander's libretto since its setting to music by J. S. Bach in 1731, and the first contemporary setting completely following the baroque style
- La Passione di Cristo secondo S. Marco by Lorenzo Perosi
- St Mark Passion (Wood) by Charles Wood
- La Pasión según San Marcos (Golijov) by Osvaldo Golijov
- St Mark Passion Op.180, John Joubert
- Swedish St Mark Passion, Fredrik Sixten
- Passione Secondo Marco, Claudio Ambrosini
