= St Mark Passion, BWV 247 =

Musical composition by J.S. Bach

The St Mark Passion (German: Markus-Passion), BWV 247, is a lost Passion setting by Johann Sebastian Bach, first performed in Leipzig on Good Friday, 23 March 1731. Though Bach's music is lost, the libretto by Picander is still extant, and from this, the work can to some degree be reconstructed.

== History ==
Unlike Bach's earlier existing passions (St John Passion and St Matthew Passion), the Markus-Passion is probably a parody—it recycles previous works. The St Mark Passion seems to reuse virtually the whole of the Trauer Ode Laß, Fürstin, laß noch einen Strahl, BWV 198, along with the two arias from Widerstehe doch der Sünde, BWV 54. In addition, two choruses from the St Mark Passion may have been reused in the Christmas Oratorio. This leaves only a couple of missing arias, which are taken from other Bach works when reconstructions are attempted. However, since Bach's recitative is lost, most reconstructions use the recitatives composed for a Markus-Passion attributed to Reinhard Keiser, a work which Bach himself performed on at least two occasions, which gives a certain authenticity to things, although it could be viewed as somewhat disrespectful to Keiser's work. However, Keiser's setting starts slightly later than Bach's, which requires a small amount of composition on the part of the reconstructor.

Bach's St. Mark Passion was first performed in Leipzig on Good Friday, 23 March 1731. Written under the pseudonym Picander, Christian Friedrich Henrici's libretto survives in a 1732 poetry collection. The Markus-Passion is a modest setting, adding to Mark chapters 14 and 15 only eight free verse arias and 16 hymn stanzas. The chorales assume greater weight owing to their higher proportional use: 16 of the 46 movements are chorales in the St Mark Passion, whereas only 13 of 68 numbers are chorales in the St Matthew Passion. Five of the Markus-Passion texts appear to match the 1727 Trauer Ode, other likely parodies include BWV 54 and BWV 120a. However, no musical material remains for the Gospel texts or turba choruses. Further, we have no knowledge of the keys and orchestration which Bach used. While the libretto specifies which chorale melodies were used, Bach's harmonizations remain uncertain.

== Structure ==
According to Bach Digital, the Passion was scored for SATB singers, two traversos, two oboes, two oboes d'amore, a string section consisting of two violin parts and two viola parts, organ and continuo, possibly complemented by two violas da gamba and two lutes.

Legend to the table
column		content
1	#	Number of movement according to libretto at Bach Digital website, followed, between brackets, by the movement number according to Heighes's reconstruction (1995).
2	Incipit	Text incipit of the movement.
3	Description	Description of the movement.
4	Text origin	Origin of the text.
5	≈BWV?	Conjectured relation to other known compositions by J. S. Bach, and other pieces used in reconstructions; Chorale settings outside the BWV 253–438 range indicate settings of the hymn tune included in other known larger works not necessarily reused in or composed for BWV 247; BC D 5, or BNB I/K/2, refers to Bach's second Leipzig version of the Jesus Christus ist um unsrer Missetat willen verwundet pasticcio, containing a setting of St Mark's Passion text.

Structure of St Mark Passion, BWV 247
#	Incipit	Description	Text origin	≈BWV?
(↑up↑)	— Part I —			
1 (1)	Geh Jesu, geh zu deiner Pein!	Chorus	Picander 1732, p. 49	198/01
2 (2)	Und nach zween Tagen war	Recitative (ev.)	Mark 14:01–02a	
3 (2)	Ja nicht auf das Fest	Chorus (turba)	Mark 14:02b	
4 (2)	Und da er zu Bethanien war	Recitative (ev.)	Mark 14:03–04a	
5 (2)	Was soll doch dieser Unrat?	Chorus (turba)	Mark 14:04b–05a	
6 (2)	Und murreten über sie	Recitative (ev.)	Mark 14:05b	
7 (3)	Sie stellen uns wie Ketzern nach	Chorale	"Wo Gott der Herr", v. 4	256 257 258
8 (4)	Jesus aber sprach	Recitative (ev., Christ)	Mark 14:06–11	
9 (5)	Mir hat die Welt trüglich gericht	Chorale	"In dich hab ich gehoffet", v. 5	52/6 244/32 248/46
10 (6)	Und am ersten Tage	Recitative (ev.)	Mark 14:12a	
11 (6)	Wo willst du, dass wir hingehen	Chorus (turba)	Mark 14:12b	
12 (6)	Und er sandte seiner Jünger	Recitative (ev., Christ)	Mark 14:13–19	
13 (7)	Ich, ich und meine Sünden	Chorale	"O Welt, sieh hier dein Leben", v. 4	393
14 (8)	Er antwortete, und sprach zu	Recitative (ev., Christ)	Mark 14:20–25	
15 (9)	Mein Heiland, dich...	Aria (alto)	Picander 1732, p. 52	198/05
16 (10)	Und da sie den Lobgesang	Recitative (ev., Christ)	Mark 14:26–28	BC D 5/02a
17 (11)	Wach auf, o Mensch	Chorale	"O Ewigkeit, du Donnerwort", v. 13	397
18 (12)	Petrus aber sagte zu ihm	Recitative (ev., Peter, Christ)	Mark 14:29–34	BC D 5/02b, /04a
19 (13)	Betrübtes Herz sei wohlgemut	Chorale	"Betrübtes Herz", v. 1	428 430
20 (14)	Und ging ein wenig fürbaß	Recitative (ev., Christ)	Mark 14:35–36	BC D 5/04b
21 (15)	Mach's mit mir Gott	Chorale	"Mach's mit mir Gott", v. 1	377
21 (16)	Und kam und fand sie schlafend	Recitative (ev., Christ)	Mark 14:37–42	BC D 5/06a
22 (17)	Er kommt, er kommt	Aria (soprano)	Picander 1732, p. 55	198/03
23 (18)	Und alsbald, da er noch redete	Recitative (ev., Judas)	Mark 14:43–45	BC D 5/06b
24 (19)	Falsche Welt	Aria (alto)	Picander 1732, p. 56	54/1
25 (20)	Die aber legten ihre Hände	Recitative (ev., Christ)	Mark 14:46–49	BC D 5/08a
26 (21)	Jesu, ohne Missetat	Chorale	"Jesu Leiden", v. 8	159/5 245/14, /28
27 (22)	Und die Jünger verließen ihn	Recitative (ev.)	Mark 14:50–52	BC D 5/08b(a)
28 (23)	Ich will hier bei dir stehen	Chorale	"O Haupt voll Blut", v. 6	270 271
(↑up↑)	— Part II —			
29 (24)	Mein Tröster ist nicht mehr	Aria (tenor)	Picander 1732, p. 57	198/08
30 (25)	Und sie führeten Jesum	Recitative (ev., testes)	Mark 14:53–59	BC D 5/08b(b)–08d(a)
31 (26)	Was Menschenkraft	Chorale	"Wo Gott der Herr", v. 2	248/28 257
32 (27)	Und der Hohe Priester	Recitative (ev., high pr.)	Mark 14:60–61a	BC D 5/08d(b)
33 (28)	Befiehl du deine Wege	Chorale	"Befiehl du deine Wege", v. 1	270 271
34 (29)	Da fragte ihn der Hohe Priester	Recitative (ev., high pr., Chr., choir)	Mark 14:61b–65	BC D 5/08d(c), /10a–c
35 (30)	Du edles Angesichte	Chorale	"O Haupt voll Blut", v. 2	271
36 (31)	Und Petrus war danieden	Recitative (ev., ancilla, Pet., choir)	Mark 14:66–72	BC D 5/10c–e
37 (32)	Herr, ich habe missgehandelt	Chorale	"Herr, ich habe", v. 1	331
38 (33)	Und bald am Morgen	Recitative (ev., Pilate, Chr., choir)	Mark 15:01–14	BC D 5/14, /16a–d
39 (34)	Angenehmes Mordgeschrei!	Aria (soprano)	Picander 1732, p. 62	248/45
39 (35)	Pilatus aber gedachte	Recitative (ev., choir)	Mark 15:15–19	BC D 5/19a–c
40 (36)	Man hat dich sehr hart	Chorale	"Jesu, meines Lebens Leben", v. 4	
41 (37)	Und da sie ihn verspottet hatten	Recitative (ev.)	Mark 15:20–24	BC D 5/19c, /21, /23
42 (38)	Das Wort sie sollen lassen	Chorale	"Ein feste Burg ist unser Gott", v. 4	302
43 (39)	Und es war um die dritte Stunde; Pfui dich, wie fein zerbrichts do den Tempel; Desselben gleichen Die Hohenpriester verspotteten Er hat andern geholfen Und die mit ihm gekreuzigt waren Eli, Eli, lama asabthani? Das ist verdolmetscht	Recitative (ev.) chorale recitative (ev.) chorale recitative (ev.); Chr. recitative (ev.)	Mark 15:25–34	BC D 5/23, /25a–e, /27a–c
44 (40)	Keinen hat Gott verlassen	Chorale	"Keinen hat Gott verlassen", v. 1	369
45 (41)	Und Etliche, die dabei stunden	Recitative (ev., choir, miles)	Mark 15:35–37	BC D 5/27c–e
46 (42)	Welt und Himmel nehmt	Aria (bass)	Picander 1732, p. 66	7/2
47 (43)	Und der Vorhang im Tempel	Recitative (ev., centurio)	Mark 15:38–45	BC D 5/21, /33
48 (44)	O! Jesu du	Chorale	"O Traurigkeit, o Herzeleid", v. 8	404
49 (45)	Und er kaufte ein Leinwand	Recitative (ev.)	Mark 15:46–47	BC D 5/35
50 (46)	Bei deinem Grab	Chorus	Picander 1732, p. 67	198/10 244a/7

== Reconstructed versions ==
=== Hellmann (1964) – Koch (1999) ===
Diethard Hellmann completed a reconstruction in 1964 based on parodies and chorale harmonization choices only. The English premiere took place in Oxford, July 1965. A 1976 edition includes additional choruses to be used with a spoken delivery of the gospel text. Carus-Verlag published Hellmann's work with newly composed recitatives and arias by Johannes Koch in 1999. The orchestration for the work matches that of BWV 198.

Recordings:

- Wolfgang Gönnenwein, South German Madrigal Choir (Stuttgart), Pforzheim Chamber Orchestra (Erato, 1965; later [1972?] Musical Heritage Society; LC 72–751034)
- Bongiovanni GB 2024/25-2 (recorded 1984)
- In 2009 a performance and live recording of the reconstructed version by Diethard Hellmann and Andreas Glöckner, in the Frauenkirche Dresden with the augmented ensemble Amarcord and the Kölner Akademie was conducted by Michael Alexander Willens. The lost recitatives were replaced by recitation.

=== Heighes (1995) ===
Simon Heighes's reconstruction was completed in 1995.

Recordings:

- Jörg Breiding for Rondeau
- A recording of Simon Heighes's reconstruction was made by the European Union Baroque Orchestra with the Ring Ensemble of Finland conducted by Roy Goodman. Rogers Covey-Crump EVANGELIST, Gordon Jones JESUS, Connor Burrowes treble, David James alto, Paul Agnew tenor, and Teppo Tolonen baritone. It was published by Brilliant Classics, recorded 25–30 March 1996 in the Chapel of New College, Oxford.

=== Gomme (1997) ===
Andor Gomme edited a 1997 reconstruction published by Bärenreiter that utilizes BWV 198 and choruses from BWV 204, 216, 120a, and 54. The recitatives and turba choruses are drawn from a St Mark Passion traditionally attributed to Reinhard Keiser (1674–1739).

Recording:

- A recording of Gomme's reconstruction was made in 1998 by the Choir of Gonville & Caius College and the Cambridge Baroque Camerata, led by Geoffrey Webber. The recording was issued in 1999 by ASV.

=== Kelber (1998) ===
In 1998 Rudolf Kelber reconstructed the St Mark Passion as a pasticcio: he completed Bach's fragments using arias from cantatas by Bach, recitatives by Keiser, motives by Telemann.

=== Koopman (1999) ===
In 1999, Ton Koopman presented a reconstruction that does not utilize BWV 198, but instead draws on Es ist nichts Gesundes an meinem Leibe, BWV 25 (opening chorus) and Siehe zu, daß deine Gottesfurcht nicht Heuchelei sei, BWV 179 (turba choruses).

Recordings conducted by Ton Koopman:

- Erato 8573-80221-2 (recorded 1999, issued 2000)
- CCDVD 72141 (DVD: live recording 2000, issued 2005)

=== Boysen (2010) ===
In 2010, harpsichordist and conductor Jörn Boysen made a new version utilizing choruses and arias from BWV 198 and an aria from BWV 54. He composed all missing recitatives, turba choirs and one aria. This version has been performed in the Netherlands and Germany in 2011 and 2012.

=== Grychtolik (2010) ===
In 2010, Alexander Ferdinand Grychtolik made a first edition of the late version of the St Mark Passion (from 1744) as a stylistically consistent reconstruction, published by Edition Peters. The text of this unknown later version was discovered in 2009 in Saint Petersburg. In this version, Bach added two arias and he made small changes in Picander's text.

=== Eichelberger (2015) ===
In 2015, Organist Freddy Eichelberger offered a second reconstruction of the 1744 version based on the BWV 198 and composed all missing recitatives, turba choirs and some chorals.

=== Wilson-Dickson (2016) ===
In 2016, composer and conductor Andrew Wilson-Dickson made a new stylistically coherent reconstruction using BWV 198, 7, 54 and 171, and newly composed music for the missing recitatives and turba choruses. The work was premiered by the Welsh Camerata and Welsh Baroque Orchestra at the Royal Welsh College of Music & Drama, Cardiff, on Good Friday, 2016.

=== Fischer (2016) ===
In 2015, church musician Andreas Fischer reconstructed the Markus Passion by parodying only works by Bach. He paid attention to the proximity of text and music and avoided using music from the known passions, so as not to produce a "small" St. Matthew Passion. Ortus (Berlin, Germany) published this work in the year 2016.

=== Koolstra (2017) ===
In 2017, the Dutch organist and harpsichordist Robert Koolstra made his reconstruction based on the text booklet from 1744. For this version he used, among other things, the 'Trauerode' and the cantatas 13, 54, 55. He composed most of the recitatives himself, but also reused parts of Bach's other passions. He also created a new choir, Keinen hat Gott verlassen. Picander writes Chorus here instead of Choral in the new text booklet. This version is regularly performed worldwide. (Including performances in the United States, Canada, Hongkong, The Netherlands, Australia) The score and parts of this version are available for free via the International Music Score Library Project. (IMSLP)

=== Savall (2018) ===
On 30 March 2018, Jordi Savall produced a reconstruction which aired on BBC Radio 3.

=== Lutz (2024) ===
In March 2024, Rudolf Lutz performed the premiere of his own reconstruction of the work at the University of Zurich.
