= Julia Wilson-Dickson =

British voice and dialect coach

Julia Wilson-Dickson (2 August 1949 – 16 October 2015) was a British voice and dialect coach whose students included some of the best known actors in film and theater.

== Early life and education ==
Wilson-Dickson was born in Brighton to Philip Wilson-Dickson, a civil servant in the Home Office, and Olivia (née Rudder), an actress. She was the sister of Andrew Wilson-Dickson. She attended Guildford High School, an all-girls school in Surrey, and the Central School of Speech and Drama in London, where her mother had also studied.

== Career ==
Wilson-Dickson taught speech at the Central School of Speech and Drama from 1974 to 1987.

In film, she was the dialect coach for Robert de Niro in the 1994 film, Mary Shelley's Frankenstein; Helena Bonham Carter for the 1995 romantic comedy, Mighty Aphrodite; Julianne Moore for The End of the Affair in 1999; and Glenn Close in the 2011 film, Albert Nobbs. Most recently, Wilson-Dickson coached actor Eddie Redmayne to prepare for his portrayal of Stephen Hawking in the 2014 biopic, The Theory of Everything. Redmayne won an Academy Award for Best Actor at the 87th Academy Awards for his performance.

Much of her coaching for stage productions involved collaborations with Peter Hall's production company. She coached Vanessa Redgrave for her portrayal of Lady Torrance in Orpheus Descending at the Haymarket Theatre in 1988; Dustin Hoffman for his role of Shylock in The Merchant of Venice at the Phoenix Theatre in 1989; as well as Anthony Hopkins and Judi Dench for their title roles in Antony and Cleopatra at the National Theatre in 1987.

== Death ==
Wilson-Dickson died from a brain haemorrhage on 16 October 2015, at the age of 66.
