= Welsh Camerata =

Welsh chamber choir

The Welsh Camerata (Welsh: Y Camerata Cymreig) is a chamber choir of 25-30 singers based in Cardiff, Wales, United Kingdom, specialising in the performance of early music. The choir is constituted as a company limited by guarantee.

== History ==
It was founded in 2004 when early music expert Andrew Wilson-Dickson from the Royal Welsh College of Music & Drama agreed to lead the choir. He remained in this rôle until his retirement in 2024. In 2024, Frederick (known as Freddie) Brown was appointed. Rehearsals take place in Canton, Cardiff.

== Performance ==
The choir has performed with individuals and orchestral groups such as Buddug Verona James, Devon Baroque Orchestra, Welsh Baroque Orchestra, and Brandon Hill Chamber Orchestra. In 2014 it gave the first performance of Andrew Wilson-Dickson's large scale oratorio Karuṇā with soloists including Emma Kirkby, and in 2016 it premièred his reconstruction of J S Bach's St Mark Passion. Members of the choir have frequently recorded for the BBC Morning Service.

== General sources ==
- Hercules, August 2005
- South Wales Argus, March 2009
- Karuna, November 2014
- Bach Mass in B Minor, 2016
- Cardiff Times, February 2017
- Church Times, April 2017
- Classical-Music.com, July 2017
- Seen and Heard International, December 2017
- Cowbridge Gem, June 2018
- Making Music, May 2019
- Art Scene in Wales, July 2019
