= List of Latin phrases (T) =

This page is one of a series listing English translations of notable Latin phrases, such as veni, vidi, vici and et cetera. Some of the phrases are themselves translations of Greek phrases, as ancient Greek rhetoric and literature started centuries before the beginning of Latin literature in ancient Rome.

Latin	Translation	Notes
tabula gratulatoria	congratulatory tablet	A list of congratulations.
tabula rasa	scraped tablet	Thus, "blank slate". Romans used to write on wax-covered wooden tablets, which were erased by scraping with the flat end of the stylus. John Locke used the term to describe the human mind at birth, before it had acquired any knowledge.
talis qualis	just as such	"Such as it is" or "as such".
taliter qualiter	somewhat	
talium Dei regnum	for of such (little children) is the kingdom of God	from St Mark's gospel 10:14 "talium (parvuli) est enim regnum Dei"; similar in St Matthew's gospel 19:14 "talium est enim regnum caelorum" ("for of such is the kingdom of heaven"); motto of the Cathedral School, Townsville.
tanquam ex ungue leonem	we know the lion by his claw	Said in 1697 by Johann Bernoulli about Isaac Newton's anonymously submitted solution to Bernoulli's challenge regarding the Brachistochrone curve.
tantum nobis creditum	so much has been entrusted to us	Motto of Erindale College in the University of Toronto, Canada.
tantum religio potuit suadere malorum	to such heights of evil are men driven by religion	Lucretius, De rerum natura I.101 Quoted by Christopher Hitchens in ch. 2 of God Is Not Great.
tarde venientibus ossa	To the late are left the bones	
Te occidere possunt sed te edere non possunt nefas est	They can kill you, but they cannot eat you, it is against the law.	The motto of the fictional Enfield Tennis Academy in the David Foster Wallace novel Infinite Jest. Translated in the novel as "They can kill you, but the legalities of eating you are quite a bit dicier".
technica impendi nationi	Technology impulses nations	Motto of Technical University of Madrid
temet nosce	know thyself	A reference to the Greek γνῶθι σεαυτόν (gnothi seauton), inscribed on the pronaos of the Temple of Apollo at Delphi, according to the Greek periegetic writer Pausanias (10.24.1). Rendered also with nosce te ipsum, temet nosce ("thine own self know") appears in The Matrix translated as "know thyself".
tempora heroica	Heroic Age	Literally "Heroic Times"; refers to the period between the mythological Titanomachy and the (relatively) historical Trojan War.
tempora mutantur et nos mutamur in illis	the times are changing, and we change in them	16th century variant of two classical lines of Ovid: tempora labuntur ("time labors", Fasti) and omnia mutantur ("everything changes", Metamorphoses). See entry for details.
tempus edax rerum	time, devourer of all things	Also "time, that devours all things", literally: "time, gluttonous of things", edax: adjectival form of the verb edo to eat. From Ovid, Metamorphoses, 15, 234-236.
tempus fugit	Time flees. Time flies.	From Virgil's Georgics (Book III, line 284), where it appears as fugit inreparabile tempus. A common sundial motto. See also tempus volat, hora fugit below.
tempus rerum imperator	time, commander of all things	"Tempus Rerum Imperator" has been adopted by the Google Web Accelerator project. It is shown in the "About Google Web Accelerator" page. Also, motto of Worshipful Company of Clockmakers.
tempus vernum	spring time	Name of song by popular Irish singer Enya
tempus volat, hora fugit	time flies, the hour flees	
tendit in ardua virtus	virtue strives for what is difficult	Appears in Ovid's Epistulae ex Ponto
teneo te Africa	I hold you, Africa!	Suetonius attributes this to Julius Caesar, from when Caesar was on the African coast.
tentanda via	The way must be tried	motto for York University
ter in die (t.i.d.)	thrice in a day	Medical shorthand for "three times a day".
terminat hora diem; terminat auctor opus.	The hour finishes the day; the author finishes his work.	Phrase concluding Christopher Marlowe's play Doctor Faustus.
terminus ante/post quem	limit before/after which	In archaeology or history, refers to the date before which an artefact or feature must have been deposited. Used with terminus post quem (limit after which). Similarly, terminus ad quem (limit to which) may also refer to the latest possible date of a non-punctual event (period, era, etc.), while terminus a quo (limit from which) may refer to the earliest such date.
terra australis incognita	unknown southern land	First name used to refer to the Australian continent
terra firma	solid earth	Often used to refer to the ground
terra incognita	unknown land	
terra nova	new land	Latin name of Newfoundland (island portion of Canadian province of Newfoundland and Labrador, capital- St. John's), also root of French name of same, Terre-Neuve
terra nullius	land of none	That is, no man's land. A neutral or uninhabited area, or a land not under the sovereignty of any recognized political entity.
terras irradient	let them illuminate the lands	Or "let them give light to the world". An allusion to Isaiah 6.3: plena est omnis terra gloria eius ("the whole earth is full of his glory"). Sometimes mistranslated as "they will illuminate the lands" based on mistaking irradiare for a future indicative third-conjugation verb, whereas it is actually a present subjunctive first-conjugation verb. Motto of Amherst College; the college's original mission was to educate young men to serve God.
tertium non datur	no third (possibility) is given	A logical axiom that a claim is either true or false, with no third option.
tertium quid	a third something	1. Something that cannot be classified into either of two groups considered exhaustive; an intermediate thing or factor. 2. A third person or thing of indeterminate character.
testis unus, testis nullus	one witness is not a witness	A law principle expressing that a single witness is not enough to corroborate a story.
textus receptus	received text	
Tibi cordi immaculato concredimus nos ac consecramus	We consecrate and entrust ourselves to your Immaculate heart (O Mary).	The inscription found on top of the central door of the Minor Basilica of the Immaculate Conception, otherwise known as the Manila Cathedral in the Philippines
timeo Danaos et dona ferentes	I fear Greeks even if they bring gifts	Danaos being a term for the Greeks. In Virgil's Aeneid, II, 49, the phrase is said by Laocoön when warning his fellow Trojans against accepting the Trojan Horse. The full original quote is quidquid id est timeo Danaos et dona ferentis, quidquid id est meaning "whatever it is" and ferentis being an archaic form of ferentes. Commonly mistranslated "Beware of Greeks bearing gifts".
timidi mater non flet	A coward's mother does not weep	A proverb from Cornelius Nepos's Vita of Thrasybulus: praeceptum illud omnium in animis esse debet, nihil in bello oportere contemni, neque sine causa dici matrem timidi flere non solere (that old precept has to be held by all in our minds: nothing should be condemned in war, and it is for a reason that it is said the mother of a coward does not weep [for her cowardly son]).
timor mortis conturbat me	the fear of death confounds me	Refrain originating in the response to the seventh lesson in the Office of the Dead. In the Middle Ages, this service was read each day by clerics. As a refrain, it appears also in other poems and can frequently be found inscribed on tombs.
tolle lege	take up and read	The Conversion of St. Augustine by Fra Angelico In late August of 386, at the age of 31, Augustine of Hippo converted to Christianity. As Augustine later told it, his conversion was prompted by hearing a child's voice say "take up and read" (Latin: tolle, lege). Resorting to the sortes biblicae, he opened a book of St. Paul's writings (Confessiones 8.12.29) at random and read Romans 13:13–14: "Not in rioting and drunkenness, not in chambering and wantonness, not in strife and envying, but put on the Lord Jesus Christ, and make no provision for the flesh to fulfil the lusts thereof."
toto cælo	by whole heaven	as far apart as possible; utterly.
totus tuus	totally yours	Offering one's life in total commitment to another. The motto was adopted by Pope John Paul II to signify his love and servitude to Mary the Mother of Jesus.
traditionis custodes	guardians of tradition	Motu proprio issued by Pope Francis in 2021 regarding the celebration of the Tridentine Mass.
transire benefaciendo	to travel along while doing good	Literally "beneficial passage." Mentioned in "The Seamy Side of History" (L'envers de l'histoire contemporaine, 1848), part of La Comédie humaine, by Honoré de Balzac, and Around the World in Eighty Days by Jules Verne.
translatio imperii	transfer of rule	Used to express the belief in the transfer of imperial authority from the Roman Empire of antiquity to the Medieval Holy Roman Empire.
tres faciunt collegium	three makes company	It takes three to have a valid group; three is the minimum number of members for an organization or a corporation.
treuga Dei	Truce of God	A decree by the medieval Church that all feuds should be cancelled during the Sabbath—effectively from Wednesday or Thursday night until Monday. See also Peace and Truce of God.
tria juncta in uno	Three joined in one	Motto of the Order of the Bath
Triste est omne animal post coitum, præter mulierem gallumque	Every animal is sad after coitus except the human female and the rooster	
tu autem Domine miserere nobis	But Thou, O Lord, have mercy upon us	Phrase said at the end of biblical readings in the liturgy of the medieval church. Also used in brief, "tu autem", as a memento mori epitaph.
tuitio fidei et obsequium pauperum	Defence of the faith and assistance to the poor	Motto of the Association of Canadian Knights of the Sovereign and Military Order of Malta and the Sovereign Military Order of Malta.
tu fui ego eris	I was you; you will be me	Thus, "what you are, I was; what I am, you will be.". A memento mori gravestone inscription to remind the reader that death is unavoidable (cf. sum quod eris).
tu ne cede malis, sed contra audentior ito	you should not give in to evils, but proceed ever more boldly against them	From Virgil, Aeneid, 6, 95. "Ne cede malis" is the motto of The Bronx.
tu quoque	you too	The logical fallacy of attempting to defend one's position merely by pointing out the same weakness in one's opponent.
tu stultus es	you are stupid	Motto for the satirical news organization, The Onion
tuebor	I will protect	Found on the Great Seal on the flag of the state of Michigan.
tunica propior est pallio	A tunic is closer [to the body] than a cloak	From Plautus' Trinummus 1154. Equivalent to "blood is thicker than water" in modern English.
turba	lit. 'uproar', 'disturbance', 'crowd'; in music, specifically in the musical settings of the Passion of Jesus, it refers to any text that is spoken by any group of people, including the disciples, the Jews, or the soldiers.	
turris fortis mihi Deus	God is my strong tower	Motto of Clan Kelly
tutum te robore reddam	I will give you safety by strength	Motto of Clan Crawford
tuum est	It's up to you	Motto of the University of British Columbia
