= Andrew Wilson-Dickson =

British composer (born 1946)

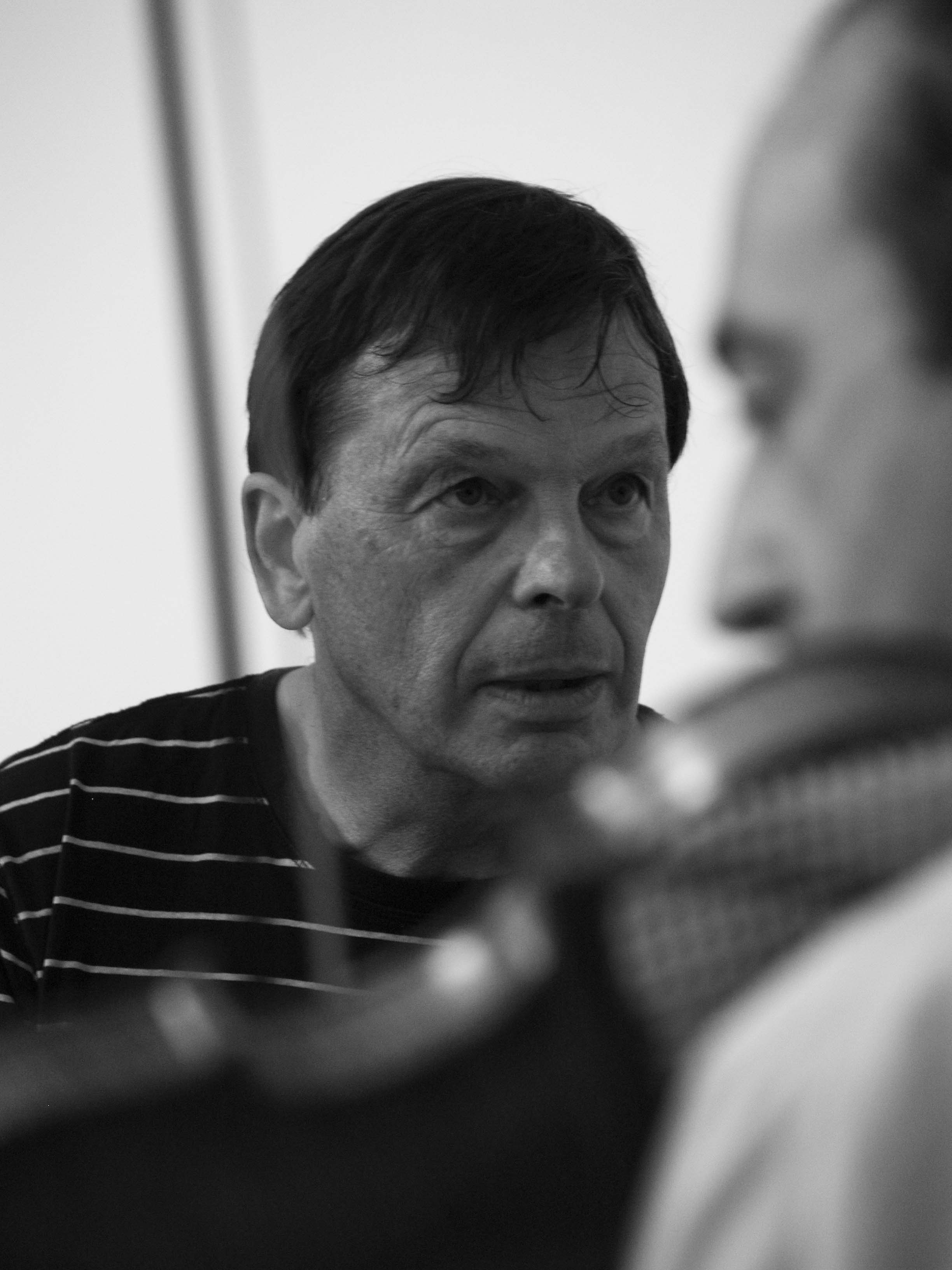
- Born: 20 January 1946 (age 80); London, England
- Education: Magdalene College, Cambridge
- Occupation: Musician
- Employer: Royal Welsh College of Music & Drama
- Relatives: Julia Wilson-Dickson (sister)
- Website: wilson-dickson.co.uk

Andrew Wilson-Dickson (born 1946) is a British composer, pianist and an authority on early music practice.

== Biography ==
Wilson-Dickson was born in London on 20 January 1946. He attended Marlborough College where in a school music competition he was spotted by Sydney Watson who offered him a scholarship to Christ Church, Oxford, in spite of unfavourable A-level results. He turned this down in favour of an exhibition to Magdalene College, Cambridge, where he received piano lessons from Lamar Crowson and John Lill. Later he held the post of organ scholar at York Minster where he studied the organ with Nicholas Danby and Francis Jackson.

He was appointed as one of the first members of staff of the newly formed University of Leicester music department in 1970.

In 1984 he was appointed to the staff of the Royal Welsh College of Music & Drama where his focus on period music led to the creation there of an Early Music Department in 1999. He was made an Honorary Fellow of the college in 2005.

Now semi-retired, he divides his time between his homes in Cardiff and the south of France. He is the brother of the voice and dialect coach Julia Wilson-Dickson.

== Composition ==
He began composition at school and has continued to compose ever since. In 1984, just prior to his move to Wales to work at the Welsh College of Music and Drama, he won the Tlws y Cerddor prize at the Welsh National Eisteddfod. He won the Bournemouth-Parry International Festival composition prize in 1999 and has received numerous commissions for orchestral works, opera and chamber music. He has written three chamber operas, Sir Gawain and the Green Knight (1977), Errors (1980) and Wycliffe (1984). In 2014 he produced his large-scale oratorio Karuṇā on the theme of world peace. It received its first performance on 8 November 2014 conducted by the composer and with the Welsh Camerata, for whom the piece had been written, and soloists including Emma Kirkby. The piece received its second performance on 24 September 2016 at St John's Church, Waterloo, with the Choir of the 21st Century under the baton of Howard Williams. In 2016 he finished a fresh reconstruction of J S Bach's St Mark Passion for which he composed the recitatives and a number of short choruses in the style of the great master. This received its first performance in Cardiff on Good Friday, 26 March 2016

== Performance ==
He is known as an accompanist on piano and harpsichord, and is also an authority on performance practice on strings, specifically viols and the violone. He has performed in BBC television and radio and concerts throughout the UK on piano, particularly the duet and two-piano repertoire, and internationally on harpsichord in chamber music and as continuo for professional orchestras and chamber groups. In 1992 he founded the Welsh Baroque Orchestra. He has also directed a number of choirs, most recently the Welsh Camerata which he was invited to lead on its foundation in 2004 until his retirement from the rôle in 2024. In 2016 he was appointed to direct Devon Baroque, the principal orchestra in south west England specialising in baroque and early classical music played on period instruments.

== Authorship ==
He has authored a book The Story of Christian Music: An Illustrated Guide to All the Major Traditions of Music in Worship which has been translated into a number of languages. He has also written articles for The New Grove Dictionary of Music and Musicians (2000 edition) and for magazines and journals including The Consort, BBC Music and Choir and Organ.
