= Tempus fugit =

Latin phrase meaning "time flies"

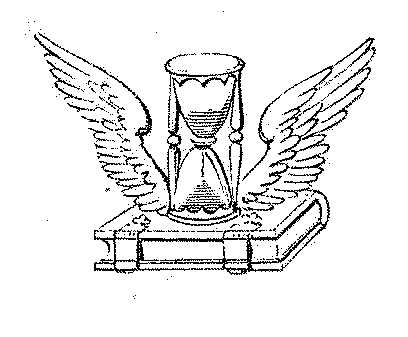
A winged hourglass representing time flying, designed for gravestones and monuments

Tempus fugit (Classical Latin pronunciation: [ˈt̪ɛmpʊs̠ ˈfʊɡit̪]) is a Latin phrase, usually translated into English as "time flies". The expression comes from line 284 of book 3 of Virgil's Georgics, where it appears as fugit irreparabile tempus: "it escapes, irretrievable time". The phrase is used in both its Latin and English forms as a proverb that "time's a-wasting".

== Usage ==
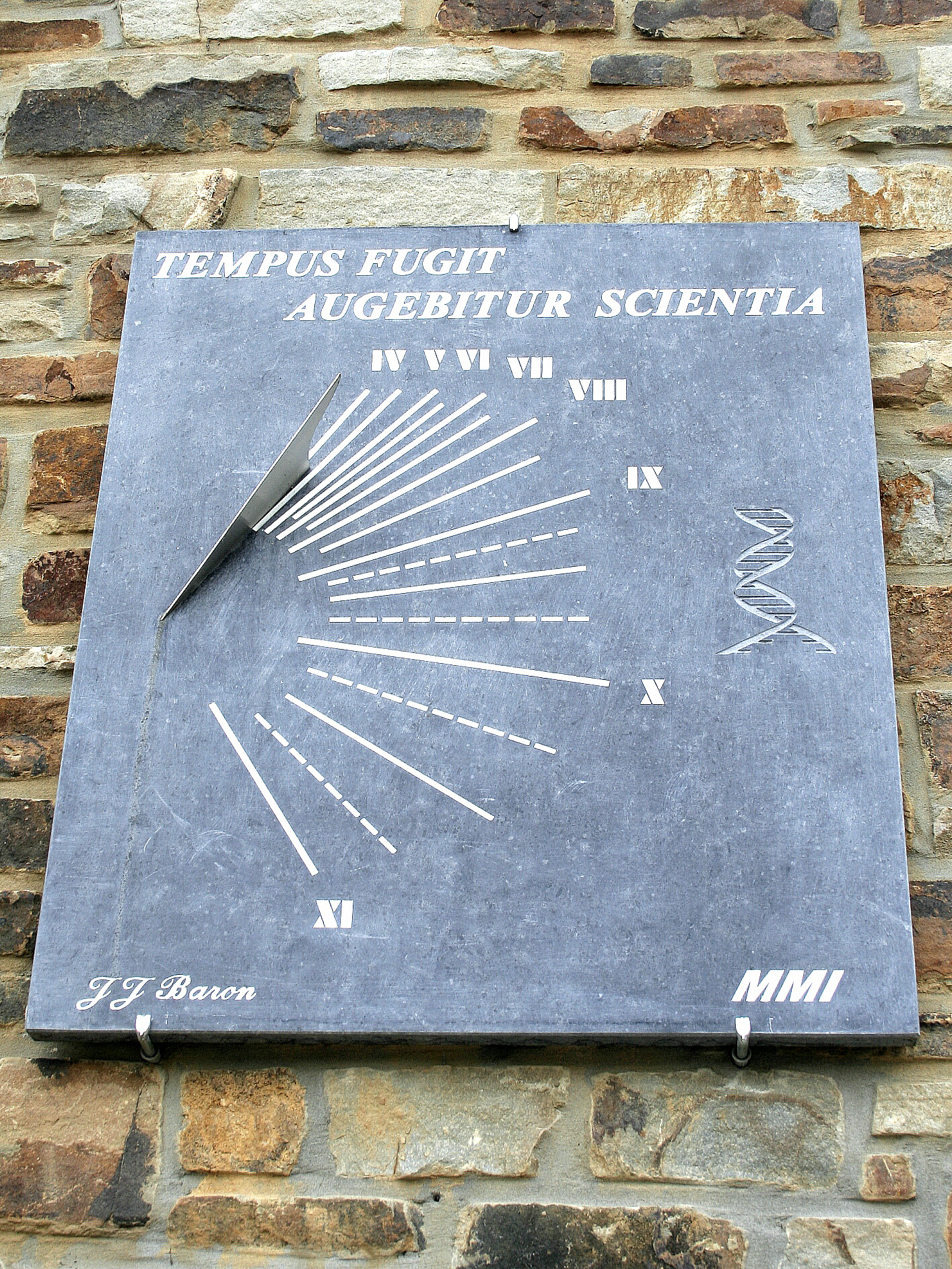
An example of the phrase as a sundial motto in Redu, Belgium

Tempus fugit is typically employed as an admonition against sloth and procrastination (cf. carpe diem) rather than an argument for licentiousness (cf. "gather ye rosebuds while ye may"); the English form is often merely descriptive: "time flies like the wind", "time flies when you're having fun".

The phrase is a common motto, particularly on sundials and clocks. It also has been used on gravestones.

Some writers have attempted rebuttals: "Time goes, you say? Ah, no! alas, time stays, we go." by Henry Austin Dobson (1840–1921)."Hêd Amser! / Meddi Na! / Erys Amser / Dyn Â" on sundial at Univ of Bangor, North Wales. says the sundial was commissioned by Sir William Henry Preece, and offers an English equivalent: "Time flies, thou sayest – Nay! Man flies; Time still doth stay." Another English version is: "Time Flies, Say Not So: Time Remains,'Tis Man Must Go."

Bud Powell's composition "Tempus Fugue-it" is a pun on the phrase.

== In the Georgics ==
The phrase's full appearance in Virgil's Georgics is:

Original (Virgil)	Translation (Dryden)	Translation (Rhoades)
Omne adeo genus in terris hominumque ferarumque	Thus every Creature , and of every Kind , The secret Joys of sweet Coition find : Not only Man's Imperial Race ; . . .	Nay, every race on earth of men, and beasts,
et genus aequoreum, pecudes pictaeque volucres,	. . . but they That wing the liquid Air ; or swim the Sea , Or haunt the Desart , . . .	And ocean-folk, and flocks, and painted birds,
in furias ignemque ruunt: amor omnibus idem. ...	. . . rush into the flame : For Love is Lord of all ; and is in all the same .	Rush to the raging fire: love sways them all.
Sed fugit interea, fugit irreparabile tempus,	But time is lost , which never will renew ,	Fast flies meanwhile the irreparable hour,
singula dum capti circumvectamur amore.	While we too far the pleasing Path pursue ; Surveying Nature , with too nice a view .	As point to point our charmed round we trace.

== See also ==
- Time flies like an arrow; fruit flies like a banana
- Ars longa, vita brevis
- Carpe diem
- Got a Lot o' Livin' to Do!, sung by Elvis Presley, in which "times a wasting" appears as a lyric.
- Memento mori
