= List of Latin phrases (G) =

This page is one of a series listing English translations of notable Latin phrases, such as veni, vidi, vici and et cetera. Some of the phrases are themselves translations of Greek phrases, as ancient Greek rhetoric and literature started centuries before the beginning of Latin literature in ancient Rome.

Latin	Translation	Notes
Gallia est omnis divisa in partes tres	all Gaul is divided into three parts	the celebrated opening line of Julius Caesar's Commentaries on the Gallic War
gaudia certaminis	the joys of battle	according to Cassiodorus, an expression used by Attila in addressing his troops prior to the 451 Battle of Châlons
gaudeamus hodie	let us rejoice today	
gaudeamus igitur	therefore let us rejoice	First words of an academic anthem used, among other places, in The Student Prince.
gaudete in domino	rejoice in the Lord	Motto of Bishop Allen Academy
gaudium in veritate	joy in truth	Motto of Campion School
generalia specialibus non derogant	general provisions enacted in later legislation do not detract from specific provisions enacted in earlier legislation	A principle of statutory interpretation: If a matter falls under a specific provision in a statute enacted before a general provision enacted in a later statute, it is to be presumed that the legislature did not intend that the earlier specific provision be repealed, and the matter is governed by the earlier specific provision, not the more recent general one.
genius loci	spirit of place	The unique, distinctive aspects or atmosphere of a place, such as those celebrated in art, stories, folk tales, and festivals. Originally, the genius loci was literally the protective spirit of a place, a creature usually depicted as a snake.
generatim discite cultus	Learn each field of study according to its kind. (Virgil, Georgics II.)	Motto of the University of Bath.
gens una sumus	we are one people	Motto of FIDE. Can be traced back to Claudian's poem De consulatu Stilichonis.
gesta non verba	deeds, not words	Motto of James Ruse Agricultural High School.
Gloria in excelsis Deo	Glory to God in the Highest	Often translated "Glory to God on High". The title and beginning of an ancient Roman Catholic doxology, the Greater Doxology. See also ad maiorem Dei gloriam.
Gloria invidiam vicisti	By your fame you have conquered envy	Sallust, Bellum Jugurthum ("Jugurthine War") 10:2.
gloria filiorum patres	The glory of sons is their fathers (Proverbs17:6)	Motto of Eltham College
Gloria Patri	Glory to the Father	The beginning of the Lesser Doxology.
gloriosus et liber	glorious and free	Motto of Manitoba
gradatim ferociter	by degrees, ferociously	Motto of private spaceflight company Blue Origin, which officially treats "Step by step, ferociously" as the English translation
gradibus ascendimus	ascending by degrees	Motto of Grey College, Durham
Graecia capta ferum victorem cepit	Conquered Greece in turn defeated its savage conqueror	Horace Epistles 2.1
Graecum est; non legitur	It is Greek (and therefore) it cannot be read.	Most commonly from Shakespeare's Julius Caesar where Casca couldn't explain to Cassius what Cicero was saying because he was speaking Greek. The more common colloquialism would be: It's all Greek to me.
grandescunt aucta labore	By hard work, all things increase and grow	Motto of McGill University
gratia et scientia	grace and learning	Motto of Arundel School
gratiae veritas naturae	Truth through mercy and nature	Motto of Uppsala University
graviora manent	heavier things remain	Virgil Aeneid 6:84; more severe things await, the worst is yet to come
Gravis Dulcis Immutabilis	serious sweet immutable	Title of a poem by James Elroy Flecker
gutta cavat lapidem [non vi sed saepe cadendo]	a water drop hollows a stone [not by force, but by falling often]	main phrase is from Ovid, Epistulae ex Ponto IV, 10, 5.; expanded in the Middle Ages
