= Laß, Fürstin, laß noch einen Strahl, BWV 198 =

Secular cantata by J. S. Bach, funeral ode

Laß, Fürstin, laß noch einen Strahl
- BWV 198
- secular cantata by J. S. Bach
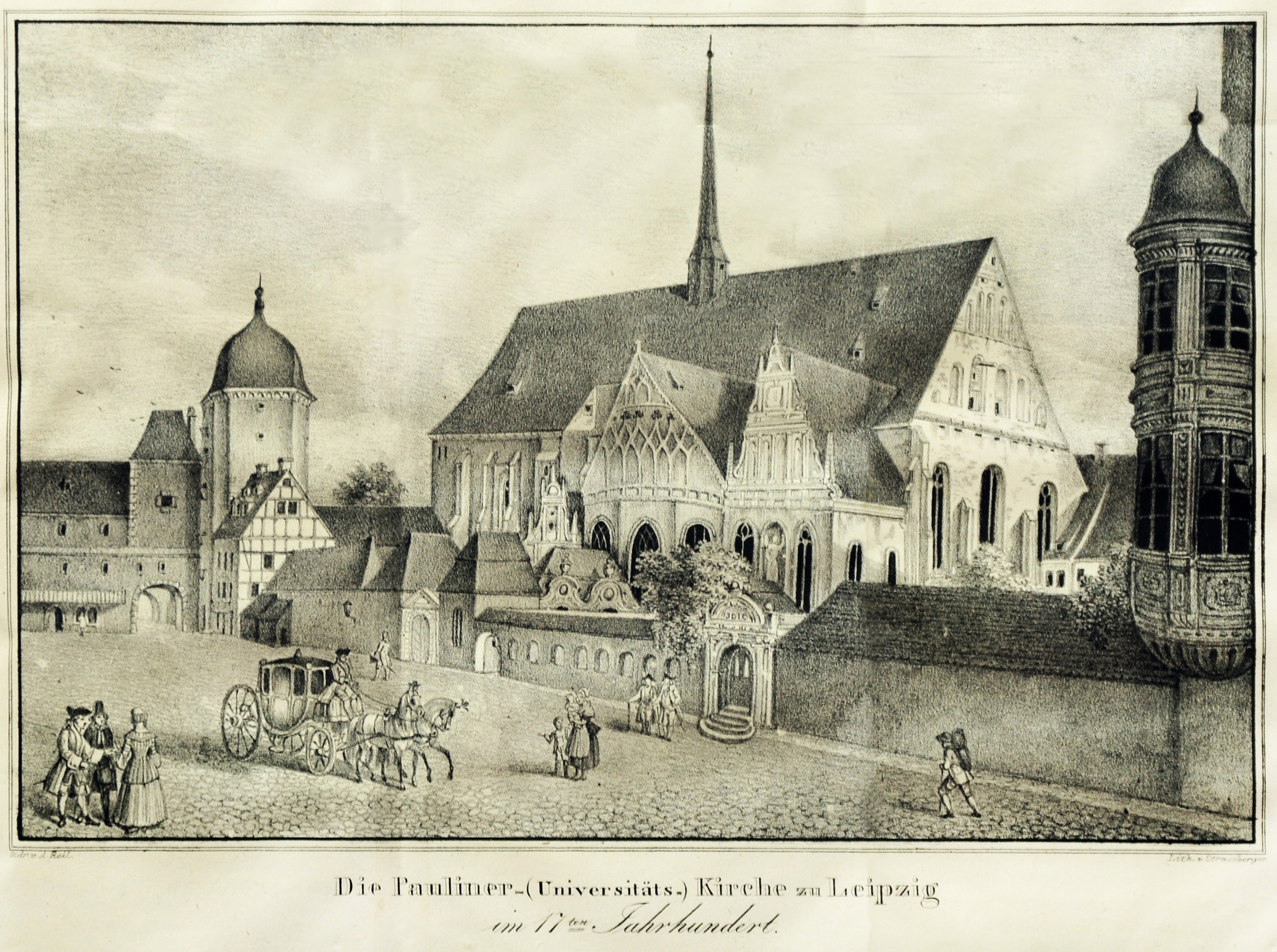
- University Church, Leipzig, where the cantata was first performed (17th-century lithograph)
- Related: St Mark Passion and BWV 244a
- Occasion: Funeral
- Cantata text: Johann Christoph Gottsched
- Performed: 17 October 1727: Paulinerkirche, Leipzig
- Movements: 10 in two parts (7, 3)
- Vocal: SATB soloists and choir
- Instrumental: 2 flutes; 2 oboes d'amore; 2 violins; viola; 2 violas da gamba; 2 lutes; continuo

Laß, Fürstin, laß noch einen Strahl (Let, Princess, let still one more glance) is a secular cantata composed as a funeral ode by Johann Sebastian Bach, first performed on 17 October 1727. In Wolfgang Schmieder's catalogue of Bach's works (BWV) it was assigned the number 198. It is also known as Trauerode or as Trauerode: auf den Tod der Königin Christiane Eberhardine.

== History and text ==
Bach wrote several works for celebrations of the Leipzig University, Festmusiken zu Leipziger Universitätsfeiern.

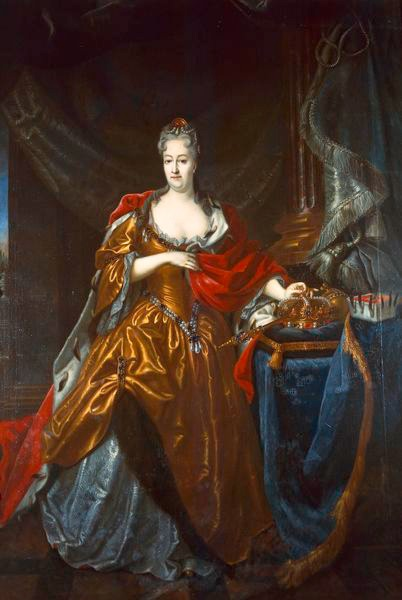
Christiane Eberhardine, Electress of Saxony, for whose funeral the cantata was written

He composed this cantata at the request of the university as a funeral ode for Christiane Eberhardine, wife of August II the Strong, the Elector of Saxony and King of Poland. The cantata was first performed on 17 October 1727 in the University Church in Leipzig. Bach himself directed from the harpsichord. The text was written by Johann Christoph Gottsched, professor of philosophy and poetry.

The text is purely secular, proclaiming how the kingdom is in shock over the princess' death, how magnificent she was, and how sadly she will be missed. Sacred elements pertaining to salvation and the afterlife are absent. Bach, however, as was his custom, included a cryptic reference to salvation in the music. The first movement of the second section Der Ewigkeit saphirnes Haus ("Eternity's sapphiric house"), which was performed following the oration, contains underlying elements of the first movement of the cantata BWV 56, Ich will den Kreuzstab gerne tragen ("I want to bear the cross") which Bach had composed one year earlier. The measures 70–75 contain a direct quote (played by the oboe) of the bass solo voice in measures 91–98 from BWV 56 where the text is Der führet mich nach meinen Plagen zu Gott, in das gelobte Land ("which leads me to God in the promised land after all my tribulation").

In the introduction to the opening chorus, Bach expresses the reluctance to bid the final farewell to the Queen by prolonging the harmonies in a manner unusual even for him. After the opening chord he avoids resolving back to the finality of the tonic for ten bars, employing deceptive cadences, Neapolitan chord, and other furtive resolutions. This mirrors and enhances the intended longing of the opening text "Princess, let one more beam of light shine". The word "Strahl" ("beam [of light]") is sung in straight rising notes, while "Tränen" ("tears") is sung in falling, cascading notes, similar to "Tränen" in the closing chorus of the St Matthew Passion, BWV 244: Wir setzen uns mit Tränen nieder ("We sit down in tears"). The word "Fürstin" ("princess", also generic for "royal lady") is always sung isolated from the rest of the text, surrounded by rests.

Bach later borrowed from the cantata for his St Mark Passion and for Klagt, Kinder, klagt es aller Welt, BWV 244a, another funeral ode written in 1729.

== Scoring and structure ==
The cantata is scored for four vocal soloists (soprano, alto, tenor, bass), a four-part choir, two flutes, two oboes d'amore, two violins, viola, two violas da gamba, two lutes and basso continuo.

The ten movements are divided into two parts, to be performed before and after the funeral oration.

First part

1. Chorus: Laß, Fürstin, laß noch einen Strahl
2. Recitative (soprano): Dein Sachsen, dein bestürztes Meißen
3. Aria (soprano): Verstummt, verstummt, ihr holden Saiten!
4. Recitative (alto): Der Glocken bebendes Getön
5. Aria (alto): Wie starb die Heldin so vergnügt!
6. Recitative (tenor): Ihr Leben ließ die Kunst zu sterben
7. Chorus: An dir, du Fürbild großer Frauen

Second part

8. Aria (tenor): Der Ewigkeit saphirnes Haus
9. Recitative (bass): Was Wunder ists? Du bist es wert
10. Chorus: Doch, Königin! du stirbest nicht

== Selected recordings ==
- J.S. Bach: Cantata BWV 198, Jürgen Jürgens, Monteverdi-Chor, Concerto Amsterdam, Telefunken, 1966
- J.S. Bach: Das Kantatenwerk – Sacred Cantatas Vol. 10, Knabenchor Hannover (Chorus Master: Heinz Hennig) & Collegium Vocale Gent (Chorus Master: Philippe Herreweghe), Leonhardt Consort, conductor Gustav Leonhardt, Teldec 1989
- Bach Edition Vol. 14 – Cantatas Vol. 7, Pieter Jan Leusink, Holland Boys Choir, Netherlands Bach Collegium, Brilliant Classics 2000
- J.S. Bach: Complete Cantatas Vol. 4, Amsterdam Baroque Orchestra & Choir, conductor Ton Koopman, Antoine Marchand
