= Scale of chords =

A scale of chords may be used to set or read an angle in the absence of a protractor. To draw an angle, compasses describe an arc from origin with a radius taken from the 60 mark. The required angle is copied from the scale by the compasses, and an arc of this radius drawn from the sixty mark so it intersects the first arc. The line drawn from this point to the origin will be at the target angle.

== Mathematics ==
A chord is a line drawn between two points on the circumference of a circle. Look at the centre point of this line. For a circle of radius r, each half will be $r\sin\tfrac{\theta}{2}$ so the chord will be $2r\sin\tfrac{\theta}{2}$. The line of chords scale represents each of these values linearly on a scale running from 0 to 60.

== Availability ==
It appears on Gunter's scale and the Foster Serle dialing scales. The commercial company Stanley marketed a metal version (Stanley 60R Line of Chords Rule) in 2015.

== See also ==
- Ptolemy's table of chords
