= List of sundial mottos =

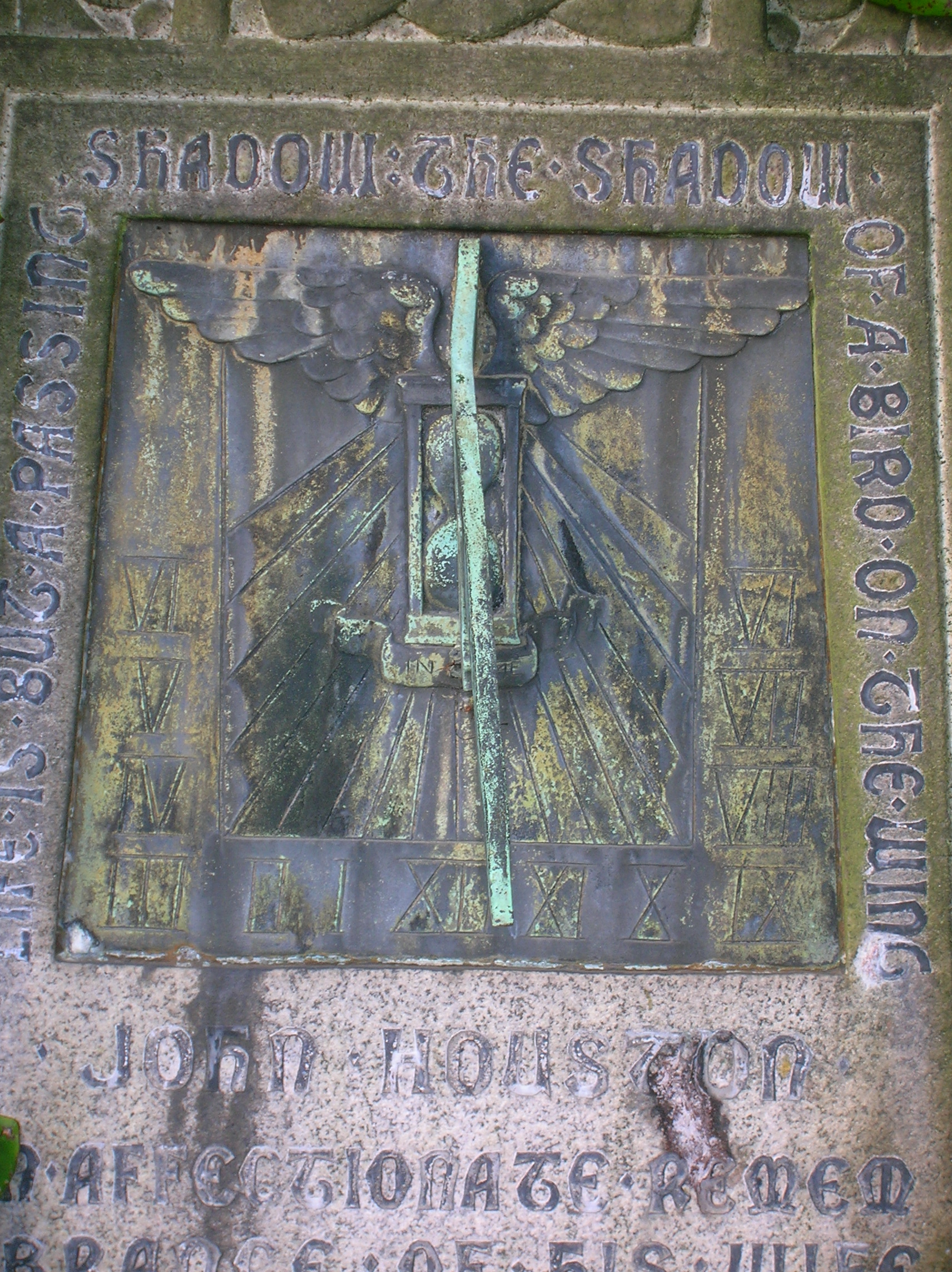
A sundial on a gravestone in Kilbirnie Auld Kirk, Kilbirnie, Ayrshire, Scotland. The motto at top reads, "Life is but a passing shadow, the shadow of a bird on the wing."

Many sundials bear a motto (Note: The plural of motto may be either mottoes or mottos.) to reflect the sentiments of its maker or owner.

== English mottos ==
- Be as true to each other as this dial is to the sun.
- Begone about Thy business.
- Come along and grow old with me; the best is yet to be.
- Hours fly, Flowers die. New days, New ways, Pass by. Love stays.
- Hours fly, Flowers bloom and die. Old days, Old ways pass. Love stays.
- I only tell of sunny hours.
- I count only sunny hours.
- The clouds shall pass and the sun will shine on us once more.
- Let others tell of storms and showers, I tell of sunny morning hours.
- Let others tell of storms and showers, I'll only count your sunny hours. Has date of 1767
- Life is but a shadow: the shadow of a bird on the wing.
- Self-dependent power can time defy, as rocks resist the billows and the sky.
- Time, like an ever-rolling stream, bears all its sons away.
- Today is Yesterday's Tomorrow
- When I am gone, mark not the passing of the hours, but just that love lives on.
- The Concern of the Rich and the Poor

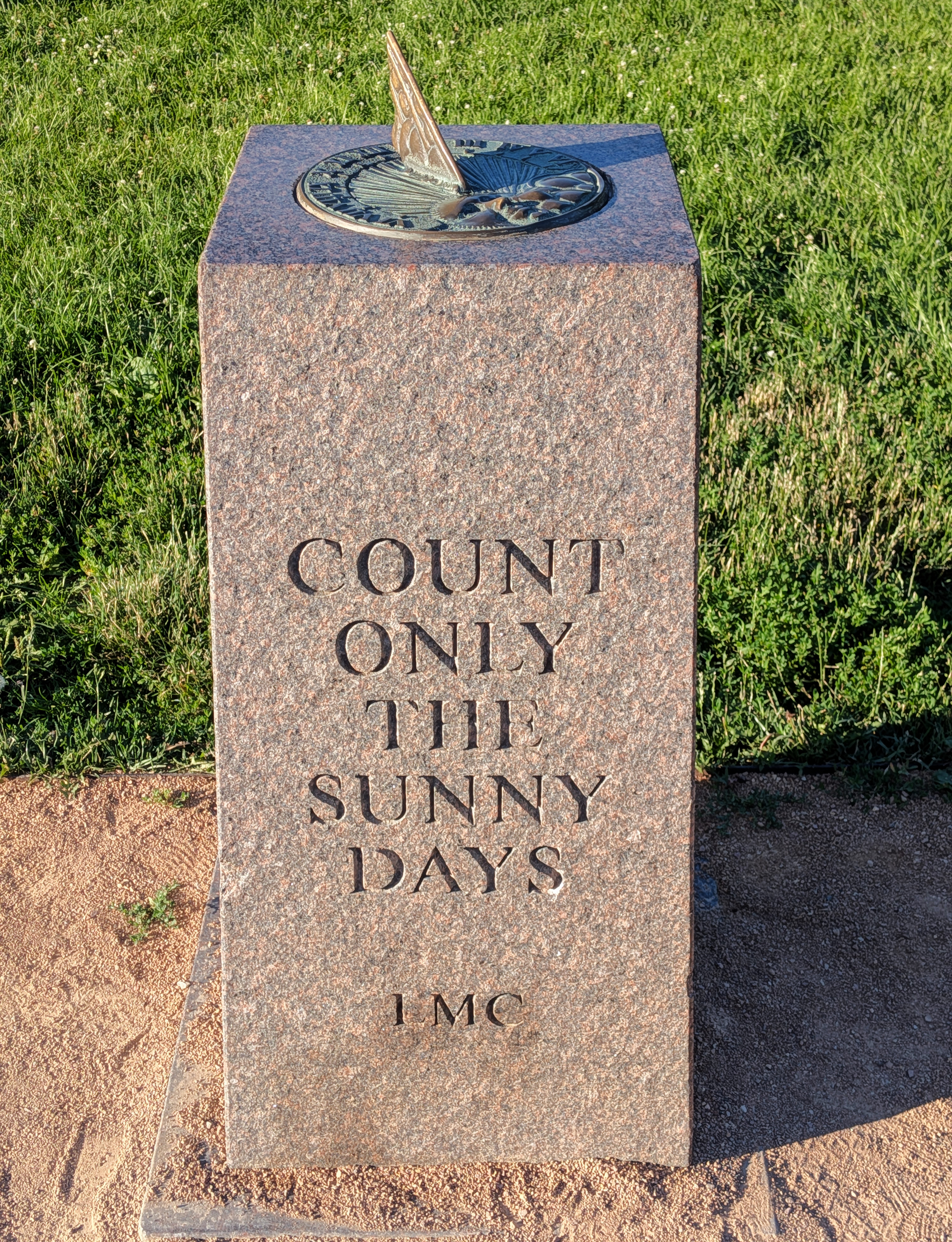
"Count only the sunny days" is inscribed on this sundial at the Lyndale Rose Garden in Minneapolis, Minnesota, USA.

- Time Takes All But Memories
- Some tell of storms and showers, I tell of sunny hours.
- Order in the court!
- Like true firemen, I am always ready.

== Latin mottos ==
=== Time flies ===
- Hora fugit, ne tardes. (The hour flees, do not be late.)
- Ruit hora. (The hour is flowing away.)
- Tempus breve est. (Time is short.)
- Tempus fugit [velut umbra]. (Time flees [like a shadow].)
- Tempus volat, hora fugit. (Time flies, the hour flees.)

=== Make use of time ===
- Altera pars otio, pars ista labori. (Devote this [hour] to work, another to leisure.)
- Festina lente. (Make haste, but slowly.)
- [Fugit hora] – carpe diem. ([The hour flees] – seize the day.)
- Utere, non numera. (Use [the hours], do not count [them].)
- Utere non reditura. (Use that [hour] which will not return.)

=== Human mortality ===
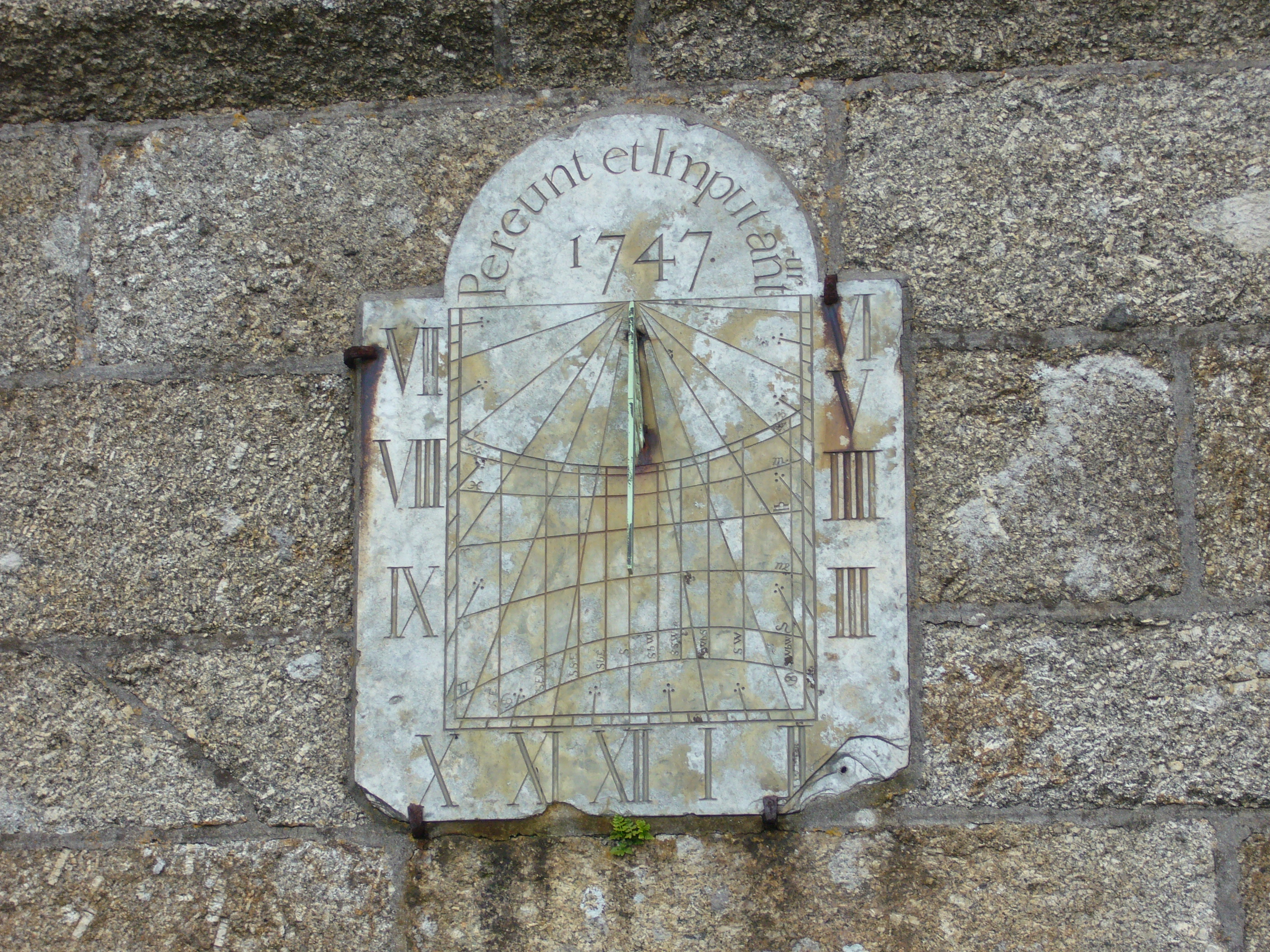
Martial's Pereunt et Imputantur on St Buryan's parish church, Cornwall

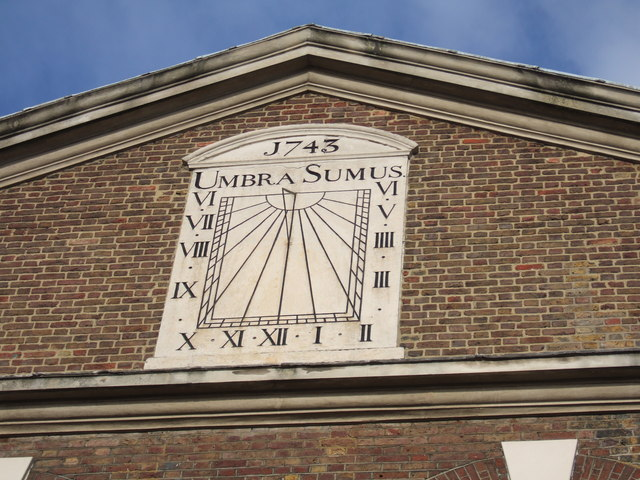
Horace's Umbra Sumus on Brick Lane Mosque, London

- Ex iis unam cave. (Beware of one [hour] out of these.)
- Lente hora, celeriter anni. (An hour [passes] slowly, but the years [pass] quickly.)
- Meam vide umbram, tuam videbis vitam. (Look at my shadow and you will see your life.)
- Memor esto brevis ævi. (Be mindful of brief life.)
- Mox nox. (Soon [it is] night.)
- Tuam nescis (You don't know your [time].)
- [Nobis] pereunt et imputantur. ([The hours] are consumed and will be charged [to our account].)
- [Pulvis et] umbra sumus. (We are [dust and] shadow.)
- Serius est quam cogitas. (It is later than you think.)
- Sic labitur ætas. (Thus passes a lifetime.)
- Sic vita fluit, dum stare videtur. (Life flows away as it seems to stay the same.)
- Ultima latet ut observentur omnes. (The last [hour] is hidden so that we watch them all.)
- Umbra sicut hominis vita. (A person's life is like a shadow.)
- Una ex his erit tibi ultima. (One of these [hours] will be your last.)
- Ver non semper viret. (Spring is not always in bloom.)
- Vita fugit, sicut umbra (Life passes like the shadow.)
- Vita similis umbræ. (Life resembles a shadow.)
- Vulnerant omnes ultima necat. (All [hours] wound; the last kills.)

=== Transience ===
- Tempus edax rerum. (Time devours things.)
- Tempus vincit omnia. (Time conquers everything.)
- Vidi nihil permanere sub sole. (I have seen that nothing under the sun endures.)

=== Virtue ===
- Dum tempus habemus operemur bonum. (While we have time, let us do good.)
- Omnes æquales sola virtute discrepantes. (All [hours] are the same; they are distinguished only by virtue.)

=== Living ===
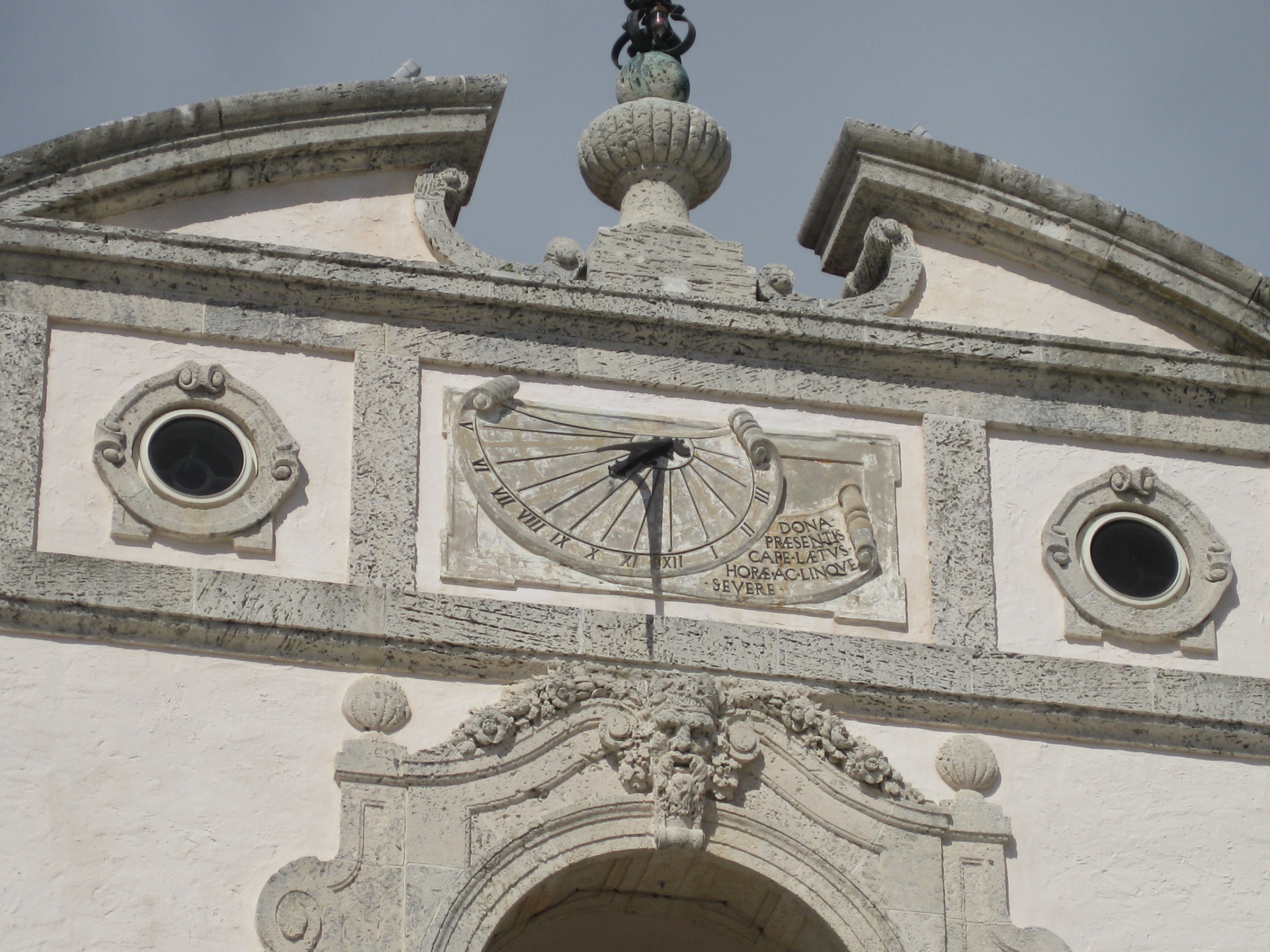
Horace's Dona præsentis cape lætus horæ ac linque severe on the Villa Vizcaya, Miami, Florida

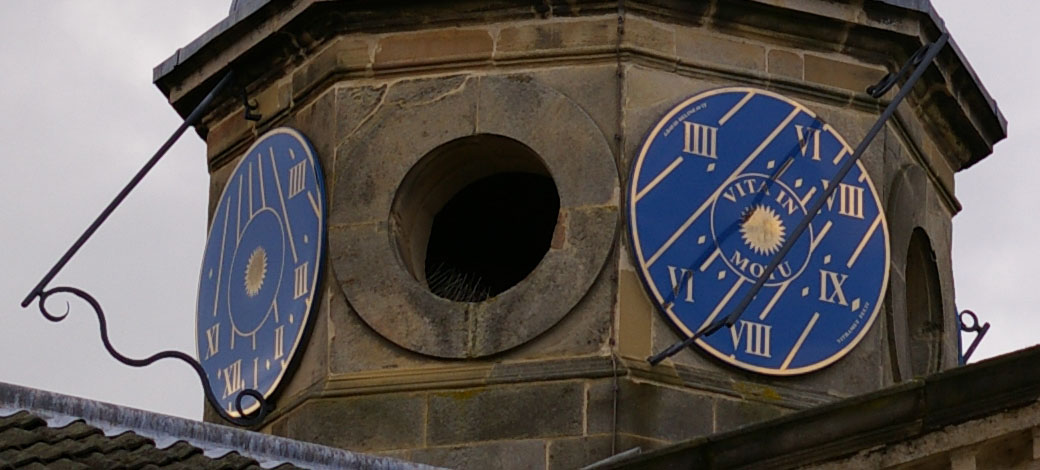
Vita in motu on one of the sundials (right) at Houghton Hall, Norfolk, England

- Amicis qualibet hora. (Any hour for my friends.)
- Dona præsentis cape lætus horæ [ac linque severe]. (Take the gifts of this hour joyfully [and leave them sternly].)
- Fruere hora. (Enjoy the hour.)
- Post tenebras spero lucem. (I hope for light to follow darkness.)
- Semper amicis hora. (Always time for friends.)
- Sit fausta quæ labitur. (May that which passes be favorable.)
- Sol omnibus lucet. (The sun shines for all.)
- Tempus omnia dabit. (Time will give all.)
- Una dabit quod negat altera. (One [hour] will give what another has refused.)
- Vita in motu. (Life [is] in motion.)
- Vivere memento. (Remember to live.)

=== Humorous ===
- Horas non numero nisi æstivas. (I do not count the hours unless they are in summer.)
- Horas non numero nisi serenas. (I do not count the hours unless they are sunny.)
- Nunc est bibendum. (Now is the time to drink.)
- Si sol deficit, respicit me nemo. (If the sun is gone, nobody will look at me.)
- Sine sole sileo. (Without the sun I fall silent.)

== German mottos ==
- Mach' es wie die Sonnenuhr; Zähl' die heitren Stunden nur! (Do like a sundial; count only the sunny hours!)

== Bibliography ==
- Earle, AM (1971). Sundials and Roses of Yesterday. Rutland, VT: Charles E. Tuttle. ISBN 0-8048-0968-2. LCCN 74142763. Reprint of 1902 book published by Macmillan (New York).
- Rohr, RRJ (1996). Sundials: History, Theory, and Practice. translated by G. Godin. New York: Dover Publications. ISBN 0-486-29139-1. Slightly amended reprint of the 1970 translation published by University of Toronto Press, Toronto. The original was published in 1965 as Les Cadrans solaires by Gauthier-Villars (Montrouge, France).
- Cadran Solaires. Nyons: Artissime. 1988. Selections from the 1895 paper by Raphaël Blanchard in the Bulletin de la Société d'Etudes des Hautes-Alpes.
