= Der Messias =

Arrangement by Wolfgang Amadeus Mozart

- Oratorio by George Frideric Handel, arranged by W. A. Mozart
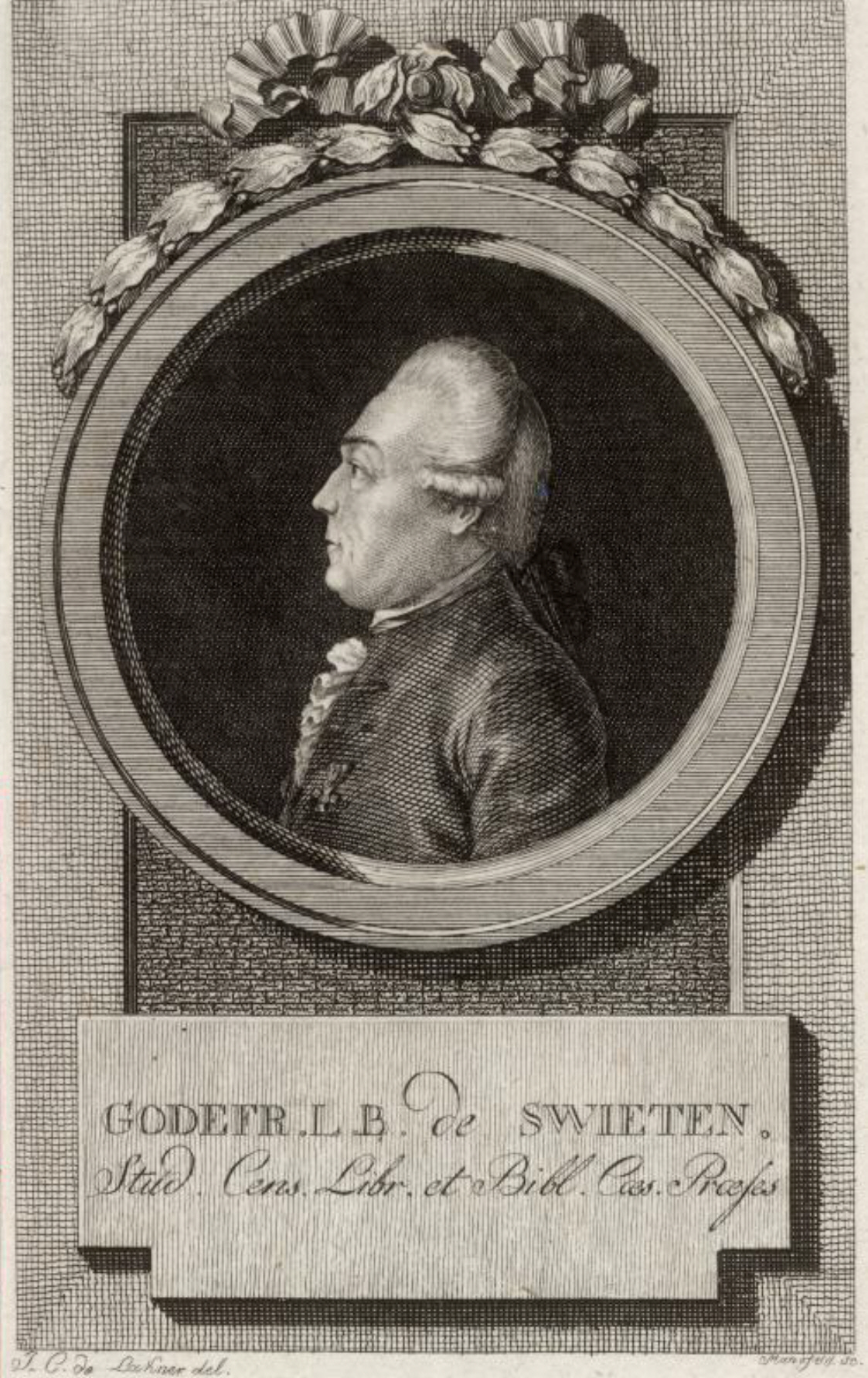
- Gottfried van Swieten, for whose Academies the arrangement was made
- Catalogue: K. 572
- Year: 1789
- Related: Messiah
- Text: translation by Friedrich Gottlieb Klopstock and Christoph Daniel Ebeling
- Based on: compilation of biblical texts by Charles Jennens
- Movements: 38 in three parts
- Scoring: 2 sopranos; tenor; bass; SATB choir; orchestra

Der Messias, K. 572, is Wolfgang Amadeus Mozart's 1789 German-language version of Messiah, George Frideric Handel's 1741 oratorio. On the initiative of Gottfried van Swieten, Mozart adapted Handel's work for performances in Vienna.

The libretto of Mozart's adaptation was largely based on Luther's translation of the Bible. Mozart re-orchestrated about three-fifths of Handel's composition, primarily providing additional parts for an extended section of wind instruments, which was called Harmonie at the time. In general, a half-century after the inception of the work, Mozart adapted an English-language work conceived for a baroque orchestra in a public venue, to accommodate the constraints of private performances and the musical tastes of Vienna.

Mozart's arrangement, first published in 1803, was instrumental in making Messiah Handel's most widely known oratorio. However, the adaptation has had few supporters amongst Mozart or Handel scholars.

== History ==
Mozart first heard Handel's Messiah in London in 1764 or 1765, and then in Mannheim in 1777. The first performance, in English, in Germany was in 1772 in Hamburg. Carl Philipp Emanuel Bach was the first to perform the oratorio in German: he presented it in 1775 in Hamburg, with a libretto translated by Friedrich Gottlieb Klopstock and Christoph Daniel Ebeling, followed by repeat performances in that city in 1777 and 1778. In 1785, Johann Adam Hiller's arrangement of Messiah was performed by 302 vocalists and instrumentalists in Berlin.

The score of Handel's Messiah was first published in London in 1767. In 1789, at the instigation of Gottfried van Swieten, who had founded the music-loving Gesellschaft der Associierten (Society of Associated Cavaliers) to sponsor such concerts, (Note: Translation from Timothy Bell's English rendering (1990) of Braunbehrens's Mozart biography. Deutsch (1965, 330) translates it as "Society of Noblemen".) Mozart arranged Handel's work to be performed for invited guests in the houses of Vienna's nobility, as he had arranged Acis and Galethea in 1788 and would, in 1790, arrange the Ode for St. Cecilia's Day (Cäcilienode) and Alexander's Feast (Alexander-Fest). His arrangement Der Messias was first performed on 6 March 1789 at Count Johann Esterházy's palace, with a repeat performance; performed in the residence of Johann Wenzel Paar; and performed twice, around Christmas that year, at the winter palace of Duke Schwarzenberg. Mozart's arrangement was intended for these specific performances, and there was no plan to print it. It was only published after his death.

=== Text ===
Handel set his music to a libretto that Charles Jennens had compiled from the King James translation of the Bible (mostly the Old Testament). Jennens commented that: "the Subject excells every other Subject. The Subject is Messiah ...". Messiah differs from Handel's other oratorios in that it does not contain an encompassing narrative, instead offering contemplation on different aspects of the Christian Messiah.

The libretto follows the liturgical year: Part I corresponding to Advent, Christmas, and the life of Jesus; Part II to Lent, Easter, the Ascension, and Pentecost; and Part III to the end of the church year—dealing with the end of time. The birth and death of Jesus are told in the words of the prophet Isaiah, the most prominent source of the libretto. The only true "scene" of the oratorio is the Annunciation to the shepherds which is taken from the Gospel of Luke. The imagery of shepherd and lamb features prominently in many movements.

Mozart set his arrangement to a German translation that Klopstock and Ebeling had written for Carl Philipp Emanuel Bach's version in Hamburg. The German text stays close to the Luther Bible translation.

=== Music ===
For the music, Handel used the same devices as in his operas and other oratorios: choral and solo singing. The solos are typically a combination of recitative and aria. His orchestra is small: oboes; strings; and basso continuo of harpsichord, violoncello, violone, and bassoon. Two trumpets and timpani highlight selected movements, such as the Hallelujah chorus. Handel uses four voice parts: soprano, alto, tenor and bass in the solo and choral movements. Handel uses both polyphonic and homophonic settings to illustrate the text. He often stresses a word by extended coloraturas, especially in several movements that are parodies of music composed earlier on Italian texts. He uses a cantus firmus, on long repeated notes especially, to illustrate God's majesty when he speaks. Even polyphonic movements typically end on a dramatic long musical rest, followed by a broad homophonic conclusion.

Mozart used the symphonic orchestra of his time, and used wind instruments (Harmonie), often to add a specific color to a movement. As in his Great Mass in C minor, Mozart assigned two soprano soloists, instead of Handel's soprano and alto; sometimes assigned choral parts to the soloists; and changed the vocal range for some recitatives and arias. He also shortened the music by cutting out a few numbers and shortening single movements: for example, using only the first section of a da capo aria. At Van Swieten's request, he wrote a new recitative.

Mozart introduced the clarinet, and he used the wind instruments to establish a mood. In choral movements, he assigned a wind instrument to play colla parte with the soprano, and a choir of three trombones to reinforce alto, tenor, and bass. The trumpet became an instrument among others, and no longer a symbol of secular or divine authority, possibly because the art of playing it had deteriorated. Mozart assigned the horn to play in the aria "Sie schallt, die Posaun'" ("The trumpet shall sound"), which Handel had set for trumpet. Mozart used a harpsichord as a continuo instrument.

== Structure ==
Mozart used Italian terminology, for example Overtura for the overture, Recitativo for secco recitatives (i.e. accompanied exclusively by thorough bass), recitativo accompagnato ed aria for an accompanied recitative followed by an aria (treated as one movement and the standard for solo movements), and Coro for choral movements. Only once is the chorus divided in an upper chorus and a lower chorus; it is four-part otherwise.

Legend to the table
column		content
1	#	movement number, according to the Bärenreiter critical edition of 1989
2	Title	Name of the movement in Mozart's adaptation
3	V	voice parts: soprano I/II (s1/s2), tenor (t) and bass (b) soloists; Quartet of soloists (q); SATB choir parts.
4	T	type: Recitative (R), secco (s) or accompagnato (a); Aria (A); Duet (D); Chorus (C); Orchestral (Or)
5	F	movement numbering by Robert Franz (1884)
6	English	English title of the movement
7	Bible	Biblical origin of the text

Structure of Mozart's Der Messias, compared to Handel's Messiah
#	Title	V	T	F	English	Bible
I	— Parte prima —	(V)	(T)	I	(↑ Go to top of table ↑)	
1	Overtura	—	Or	O	Sinfony	—
2	Tröstet Zion!	t	Ra	1	Comfort ye	Isaiah 40:1-4
2	Alle Tale macht hoch	t	A	2	Every valley	Isaiah 40:1-4
3	Denn die Herrlichkeit Gottes	SATB	C	3	And the glory of the Lord	Isaiah 40:5
4	So spricht der Herr	b	Ra	4	Thus saith the Lord	Haggai 2:6–7; Malachi 3:1-2
4	Doch wer mag ertragen	b	A	5	But who may abide	Haggai 2:6–7; Malachi 3:1-2
5	Und er wird reinigen	qSATB	C	6	And He shall purify	Malachi 3:3
5	Denn sieh! Eine Jungfrau wird schwanger	s2	Rs	7	Behold, a virgin shall conceive	Isaiah 7:14; Matthew 1:23
6	O du, die Wonne verkündet in Zion	s2	A	8	O Thou that tellest good tidings to Zion	Isaiah 40:9; Isaiah 60:1
6	O du, die Wonne verkündet in Zion	SATB	C	9	O Thou that tellest good tidings to Zion	Isaiah 40:9; Isaiah 60:1
7	Blick auf! Nacht bedeckt das Erdreich	b	Ra	10	For behold, darkness shall cover the earth	Isaiah 60:2–3
7	Das Volk, das im Dunkeln wandelt	b	A	11	The people that walked in darkness	Isaiah 9:2
8	Uns ist zum Heil ein Kind geboren	qSATB	C	12	For unto us a Child is born	Isaiah 9:6
9	Pifa	—	Or	13	Pifa	—
9	Es waren Hirten beisammen auf dem Felde	s2	Rs	14	There were shepherds abiding in the field	Luke 2:8
10	Und sieh, der Engel des Herrn	s2	Ra	14	And lo! the angel of the Lord	Luke 2:9
10	Und der Engel sprach zu ihnen	s2	Rs	14	And the angel said unto them	Luke 2:10-11
11	Und alsobald war da bei dem Engel	s2	Ra	14	And suddenly there was with the angel	Luke 2:13-14
12	Ehre sei Gott	SATB	C	15	Glory to God	Luke 2:13-14
13	Erwach' zu Liedern der Wonne	t	A	16	Rejoice greatly, O daughter of Zion	Zechariah 9:9–10
13	Dann tut das Auge des Blinden	s1	Rs	17	Then shall the eyes of the blind	Isaiah 35:5–6
14	Er weidet seine Herde	s1	A	18	He shall feed His flock	Isaiah 40:11
14	Kommt her zu ihm	s1	A	18	Come unto Him	Matthew 11:28–29
15	Sein Joch ist sanft	qSATB	C	19	His yoke is easy	Matthew 11:30
II	— Parte seconda —	(V)	(T)	II	(↑ Go to top of table ↑)	
16	Kommt her und seht das Lamm	SATB	C	20	Behold the Lamb of God	John 1:29
17	Er ward verschmähet	s2	A	21	He was despised	Isaiah 53:3; Isaiah 50:6
18	Wahrlich, wahrlich!	SATB	C	22	Surely He hath borne our griefs	Isaiah 53:4
19	Durch seine Wunden sind wir geheilt	SATB	C	23	And with His stripes we are healed	Isaiah 53:5
20	Wie Schafe gehn	SATB	C	24	All we like sheep	Isaiah 53:6
21	Und alle, die ihn seh'n	s1	Ra	25	All they that see Him	Psalms 22:8
22	Er trauete Gott	SATB	C	26	He trusted in God	Psalms 22:9
23	Die Schmach bricht ihm sein Herz	s2	Ra	27	Thy rebuke hath broken His heart	Psalms 69:20
23	Schau hin und sieh!	s2	A	28	Behold and see	Lamentations 1:12
24	Er ist dahin aus dem Lande	s1	Ra	29	He was cut off	Isaiah 53:8
24	Doch Du ließest ihn im Grabe nicht	s1	A	30	But Thou didst not leave his soul in hell	Psalms 16:10
25	Machet das Tor weit	SSATB	C	31	Lift up your heads	Psalms 24:7–10
25	Zu welchem von den Engeln	s1	Rs	32	Unto which of the angels	Hebrews 1:5
(omitted in K. 572 version)				33	Let all the angels of God	Hebrews 1:6
(omitted in K. 572 version)				34	Thou art gone up on high	Psalms 68:18
26	Der Herr gab das Wort	SATB	C	35	The Lord gave the word	Psalms 68:12
27	Wie lieblich ist der Boten Schritt	s1	A	36	How beautiful are the feet of them	Isaiah 52:7; Romans 10:15
28	Ihr Schall ging aus	SATB	C	37	Their sound is gone out	Romans 10:18; Psalms 19:4
29	Warum entbrennen die Heiden	b	A	38	Why do the nations so furiously rage	Psalms 2:1–2
30	Brecht entzwei die Ketten alle	SATB	C	39	Let us break their bonds	Psalms 2:3
30	Der da wohnet im Himmel	t	Rs	40	He that dwelleth in heaven	Psalms 2:4
31	Du zerschlägst sie	t	A	41	Thou shalt break them	Psalms 2:9
32	Halleluja	SATB	C	42	Hallelujah	Revelation 19:6,16; Revelation 11:15
III	— Parte terza —	(V)	(T)	III	(↑ Go to top of table ↑)	
33	Ich weiß, daß mein Erlöser lebt	s1	A	43	I know that my Redeemer liveth	Job 19:25–26
34	Wie durch einen der Tod	SATB	Cx4	44	Since by man came death	1 Corinthians 15:21–22
35	Merkt auf!	b	Ra	45	Behold, I tell you a mystery	1 Corinthians 15:51–53
35	Sie erschallt, die Posaune	b	A	46	The trumpet shall sound	1 Corinthians 15:51–53
35	Dann wird erfüllt	s2	Rs	47	Then shall be brought to pass	1 Corinthians 15:54–56
36	O Tod, wo ist dein Pfeil	s2/t	D	48	O death, where is thy sting	1 Corinthians 15:54–56
37	Doch Dank sei Dir Gott	SATB	C	49	But thanks be to God	1 Corinthians 15:57
37	Wenn Gott ist für uns	s1	Ra	50	If God be for us	Romans 8:31,33–34
38	Würdig ist das Lamm	SATB	C	51	Worthy is the Lamb	Revelation 5:12–13
38	Amen	SATB	C	52	Amen	Revelation 5:14

== Reception ==
Mozart's version of Handel's Messiah was first published in 1803, edited by Johann Adam Hiller. It was instrumental in making Messiah Handel's most widely known oratorio. In 1884, Robert Franz published a mixed German-and-English version of Messiah, based on Handel's original, Mozart's arrangement, and his own amendments. He tried to purge the score of Hiller's "unallowable" additions, in which he was helped by having access to Hiller's manuscript. However, few scholars of either Mozart or Handel's music have been supporters of Franz's version.

== Recordings ==
Recordings of Mozart's adaptation of Handel's Messiah
Rec.	Conductor / Orchestra / Choir Soprano I / Soprano II / Tenor / Bass; (language)	Release liner notes
1974	Mackerras / ORF Symphony Orchestra / ORF Choir Mathis / Finnilä / Schreier / Adam; (in German)	DG 427 173-2 (2 CD box)
1988	Mackerras / RPO / Huddersfield Choral Society Lott / Palmer / Langridge / Lloyd; (in English)	RCA 77862RC (2 CD box)
1991	Max / Das Kleine Konzert / Rheinische Kantorei Frimmer / Georg / Prégardien / Schreckenberger; (in German)	Emi Classics CDS 7 54353 2 (2 CD box) Heike Lies
1991	Rilling / Bach-Collegium Stuttgart / Gächinger Kantorei Brown / Kallisch / Saccà / Miles; (in German)	Hänssler 98.975 (2 CD box) Andreas Holschneider

== Sources ==
- Messiah (Handel): Scores at the International Music Score Library Project
- Bärenreiter Edition, edited by Andreas Holschneider, published in 1989, 13th edition 2016
