= I know that my Redeemer liveth (disambiguation) =

"I know that my Redeemer liveth" is a quote from the 19th chapter of the Book of Job (Job 19:25). In music it may also refer to:

== English ==
- "I know that my Redeemer liveth", the movement with which Part III of Handel's Messiah opens

== German ==
In German the phrase translates as "Ich weiß, daß mein Erlöser lebt" (and several spelling variants):

- "Ich weiß, daß mein Erlöser lebt", a German hymn, for instance included in the Neu Leipziger Gesangbuch
- Ich weiß, dass mein Erlöser lebt, ABA I, 7, by Johann Michael Bach
- Ich weiß, daß mein Erlöser lebt, TWV 1:877, a cantata by Georg Philipp Telemann, formerly, as BWV 160, also attributed to Johann Sebastian Bach
- "Ich weiß, daß mein Erlöser lebet", K. 572/33, from Mozart's German version of Handel's Messiah.
