= Structure of Handel's Messiah =

Messiah
- Oratorio by George Frideric Handel
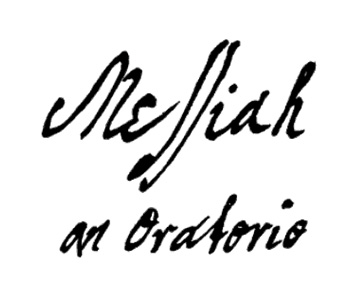
- Title page of Handel's autograph score
- Year: 1741
- Period: Baroque
- Text: Charles Jennens, from the King James Bible and the Book of Common Prayer
- Movements: 53 in three parts
- Scoring: SATB soloists and choir; instruments

Messiah (HWV 56), the English-language oratorio composed by George Frideric Handel in 1741, is structured in three parts, listed here in tables for their musical setting and biblical sources.

== Oratorio ==
The libretto by Charles Jennens is drawn from the Bible: mostly from the Old Testament of the King James Bible, but with several psalms taken from the Book of Common Prayer. Regarding the text, Jennens commented: "...the Subject excells every other Subject. The Subject is Messiah ...".

Messiah differs from Handel's other oratorios in that it does not contain an encompassing narrative, instead offering contemplation on different aspects of the Christian Messiah:

Messiah is not typical Handel oratorio; there are no named characters, as are usually found in Handel’s setting of the Old Testament stories, possibly to avoid charges of blasphemy. It is a meditation rather than a drama of personalities, lyrical in method; the narration of the story is carried on by implication, and there is no dialogue.

— Christopher Hogwood

=== Structure and concept ===
The oratorio's structure follows the liturgical year: Part I corresponding with Advent, Christmas, and the life of Jesus; Part II with Lent, Easter, the Ascension, and Pentecost; and Part III with the end of the church year—dealing with the end of time. The birth and death of Jesus are told in the words of the prophet Isaiah, the most prominent source for the libretto. The only true "scene" of the oratorio is the annunciation to the shepherds which is taken from the Gospel of Luke. The imagery of shepherd and lamb features prominently in many movements, for example: in the aria "He shall feed His flock like a shepherd" (the only extended piece to talk about the Messiah on earth), in the opening of Part II ("Behold the Lamb of God"), in the chorus "All we like sheep", and in the closing chorus of the work ("Worthy is the Lamb").

=== Scenes ===
The librettist arranged his compilation in "scenes", each concentrating on a topic.

Part I
"The prophecy and realisation of God's plan to redeem mankind by the coming of the Messiah"
Scene 1: "Isaiah's prophecy of salvation" (movements 2–4)
Scene 2: "The prophecy of the coming of Messiah and the question, despite (1), of what this may portend for the World" (movements 5–7)
Scene 3: "The prophecy of the Virgin Birth" (movements 8–12)
Scene 4: "The appearance of the Angels to the Shepherds" (movements 13–17)
Scene 5: "Christ's redemptive miracles on earth" (movements 18–21)
Part II
"The accomplishment of redemption by the sacrifice of Christ, mankind's rejection of God's offer, and mankind's utter defeat when trying to oppose the power of the Almighty"
Scene 1: "The redemptive sacrifice, the scourging and the agony on the cross" (movements 22–30)
Scene 2: "His sacrificial death, His passage through Hell and Resurrection" (movements 31–32)
Scene 3: "His ascension" (movement 33)
Scene 4: "God discloses his identity in Heaven" (movements 34–35)
Scene 5: "Whitsun, the gift of tongues, the beginning of evangelism" (movements 36–39)
Scene 6: "The world and its rulers reject the Gospel" (movements 40–41)
Scene 7: "God's triumph" (movements 42–44)
Part III
"A Hymn of Thanksgiving for the final overthrow of Death"
Scene 1: "The promise of bodily resurrection and redemption from Adam's fall" (movements 45–46)
Scene 2: "The Day of Judgment and general Resurrection" (movements 47–48)
Scene 3: "The victory over death and sin" (movements 49–52)
Scene 4: "The glorification of the Messianic victim" (movement 53)

=== Music ===
By the time Handel composed Messiah in London he was already a successful and experienced composer of Italian operas, and had created sacred works based on English texts, such as the 1713 Utrecht Te Deum and Jubilate, and numerous oratorios on English libretti. For Messiah, Handel used the same musical technique as for those works, namely a structure based on chorus and solo singing.

The orchestra scoring is simple. Although Handel had good string players at his disposal for the Dublin premiere, he may have been uncertain about the woodwind players who might be available. The orchestra consists of oboes, strings and basso continuo of harpsichord, violoncello, violone and bassoon. Two trumpets and timpani highlight selected movements, in Part I the song of the angels, Glory to God in the highest, and with timpani the closing movements of both Part II, Hallelujah, and of Part III, Worthy is the Lamb.

Only two movements in Messiah are purely instrumental: the overture (written as "Sinfony" in Handel's autograph) and the Pifa (a pastorale introducing the shepherds in Bethlehem); and only a few movements are a duet or a combination of solo and chorus. The solos are typically a combination of recitative and aria. The arias are called Airs or Songs, and some of them are in da capo form, but rarely in a strict sense (repeating the first section after a sometimes contrasting middle section). Handel found various ways to use the format freely to convey the meaning of the text. Occasionally verses from different biblical sources are combined into one movement, however more often a coherent text section is set in consecutive movements, for example the first "scene" of the work, the annunciation of Salvation, is set as a sequence of three movements: recitative, aria and chorus. The center of Part III is a sequence of six movements based on a passage from Paul's First Epistle to the Corinthians on the resurrection of the dead, a passage that Brahms also chose for Ein deutsches Requiem.

The movements marked "Recitative" (Rec.) are "secco", accompanied by only the continuo, whereas the recitatives marked "Accompagnato" (Acc.) are accompanied by additional string instruments. Handel used four voice parts, soprano (S), alto (A), tenor (T) and bass (B) in the solo and choral movements. Only once is the chorus divided in an upper chorus and a lower chorus, it is SATB otherwise. Handel uses both polyphon and homophon settings to illustrate the text. Even polyphon movements typically end on a dramatic long musical rest, followed by a broad homophon conclusion. Handel often stresses a word by extended coloraturas, especially in several movements which are a parody of music composed earlier on Italian texts. He uses a cantus firmus on long repeated notes especially to illustrate God's speech and majesty, for example "for the mouth of the Lord has spoken it" in movement 4.

=== General notes ===
The following tables are organized by movement numbers. There are two major systems of numbering the movements of Messiah: the historic Novello edition of 1959 (which is based on earlier editions and contains 53 movements), and the Bärenreiter edition of 1965 in the Hallische Händel-Ausgabe. Not counting some short recitatives as separate movements, it has 47 movements. The Novello number (Nov) is given first, then the Bärenreiter number (Bär).

== Part I ==
Nov/Bär	Title	Form	Bible source	Notes
1	Sinfony			
Scene 1
2	Comfort ye, comfort ye my people saith your god	Acc. T	Isaiah 40:1–3	Isaiah, a new Exodus
3	Ev’ry valley shall be exalted	Air T	Isaiah 40:4	
4	And the glory, the glory of the Lord shall be revealed	Chorus	Isaiah 40:5	
Scene 2
5	Thus saith the Lord, the Lord of Hosts; The Lord whom ye seek shall suddenly come to His temple	Acc. B	Haggai 2:6–7; Malachi 3:1	Haggai, splendor of the temple Malachi, the coming messenger
6	But who may abide the day of His coming for he is like a refiner's fire	Air A	Malachi 3:2	
7	And He shall purify the sons of Levi	chorus	Malachi 3:3	
Scene 3
8	Behold, a virgin shall conceive	Rec. A	Isaiah 7:14; Matthew 1:23	Isaiah, virgin birth, quoted by Matthew
9 / 8	O thou that tellest good tidings to Zion; Arise, shine	Air A Chorus	Isaiah 40:9; Isaiah 60:1	
10 / 9	For behold, darkness shall cover the earth	Acc. B	Isaiah 60:2–3	
11 / 10	The people that walked in darkness	Air B	Isaiah 9:2	
12 / 11	For unto us a Child is born	Chorus	Isaiah 9:6	
Scene 4
13 / 12	Pifa	Pastorale		
14	There were shepherds abiding in the field	Rec. S	Luke 2:8	Gospel of Luke, Annunciation to the shepherds
15 / 13	And lo, the angel of the Lord came upon them	Acc. S	Luke 2:9	
	And the angel said unto them	Rec. S	Luke 2:9–10	
16 / 14	And suddenly there was with the angel	Acc. S	Luke 2:13	
17 / 15	Glory to God in the highest	Chorus	Luke 2:14	
Scene 5
18 / 16	Rejoice greatly, O daughter of Zion	Air S	Zechariah 9:9–10	Zechariah, God's providential dealings
19	Then shall the eyes of the blind be open'd	Rec. A	Isaiah 35:5–6	Isaiah, oracle of salvation for Israel
20 / 17	He shall feed His flock like a shepherd Come unto Him, all ye that labour	Duet A S	Isaiah 40:11; Matthew 11:28–29	Isaiah, the Shepherd; Matthew, praise of the Father
21 / 18	His yoke is easy, His burthen is light	Chorus	Matthew 11:30	

== Part II ==
No N / B	Title	Form	Bible source	Notes
Scene 1
22 / 19	Behold the Lamb of God	Chorus	John 1:29	Testimony of John the Baptist
23 / 20	He was despised and rejected by men of sorrows He gave his back to his smiters	Air A	Isaiah 53:3; Isaiah 50:6	Songs of the suffering servant 4, 3
24 / 21	Surely, He hath borne our griefs and carried our sorrows	Chorus	Isaiah 53:4–5	Man of Sorrows, 4 continued
25 / 22	And with His stripes we are healed	Chorus	Isaiah 53:5	
26 / 23	All we like sheep, have gone astray	Chorus	Isaiah 53:6	
27 / 24	All they that see Him, laugh Him to scorn	Acc. T	Psalms 22:7	Psalm 22
28 / 25	He trusted in God	Chorus	Psalms 22:8	
29 / 26	Thy rebuke hath broken His heart	Acc. T	Psalms 69:20	Psalm 69
30 / 27	Behold, and see if there be any sorrow	Arioso T	Lamentations 1:12	Book of Lamentations
Scene 2
31 / 28	He was cut off out of the land of the living	Acc. T	Isaiah 53:8	Man of Sorrows
32 / 29	But Thou didst not leave his soul in hell	Air T	Psalms 16:10	Psalm 16
Scene 3
33 / 30	Lift up your heads O ye gates	Chorus	Psalms 24:7–10	Psalm 24
Scene 4
34	Unto which of the angels said he at any time	Rec. T	Hebrews 1:5	Epistle to the Hebrews
35 / 31	Let all the angels of God worship Him	Chorus	Hebrews 1:6	
Scene 5
36 / 32	Thou art gone up on high	Air B (or A)	Psalms 68:18	Psalm 68
37 / 33	The Lord gave the word	Chorus	Psalms 68:11	
38 / 34	How beautiful are the feet of them	Duet AI AII Chorus	Isaiah 52:7; Romans 10:15	
39 / 35	Their sound is gone out into all lands	Arioso T	Romans 10:18; Psalms 19:4	Psalm 19, The glory of God; Epistle to the Romans
Scene 6
40 / 36	Why do the nations so furiously rage together	Air B	Psalms 2:1–2	Psalm 2
41 / 37	Let us break their bonds asunder	Chorus	Psalms 2:3	
42	He that dwelleth in heaven	Rec. T	Psalms 2:4	
Scene 7
43 / 38	Thou shalt break them with a rod of iron	Air T	Psalms 2:9	
44 / 39	Hallelujah	Chorus	Revelation 19:6,16; Revelation 11:15	Book of Revelation

== Part III ==
No N–B	Title	Form	Bible source	Notes
Scene 1
45 / 40	I know that my Redeemer liveth	Air S	Job 19:25–26	Book of Job, Messianic anticipation
46 / 41	Since by man came death	Chorus	1 Corinthians 15:21–22	Paul on the Resurrection of the dead
Scene 2
47 / 42	Behold, I tell you a mystery	Acc. B	1 Corinthians 15:51–52	Resurrection of the body
48 / 43	The trumpet shall sound and the dead shall be rais'd	Air B	1 Corinthians 15:52–53	
Scene 3
49	Then shall be brought to pass	Rec. A	1 Corinthians 15:54	Victory over death
50 / 44	O death, where is thy sting?	Duet A T	1 Corinthians 15:55–56	
51 / 45	But thanks be to God	Chorus	1 Corinthians 15:57	
52 / 46	If God be for us, who can be against us	Air S	Romans 8:31,33–34	Paul's Assurance of salvation
Scene 4
53 / 47	Worthy is the Lamb that was slain	Chorus	Revelation 5:12–13	The creatures in heaven give praise
	Amen	Chorus		

== Alternative movements ==
Handel revised the work several times for specific performances. The alternative movements are part of the Bärenreiter edition, the Novello numbers are given in parentheses.

No.	Title	Form
6a.	But who may abide	Air B
	But who may abide	Rec. A
(15) 13a.	But lo, the angel of the Lord	Arioso S
(18) 16a.	Rejoice greatly, O daughter of Zion	Air S
(19)	Then shall the eyes of the blind	Rec. S
(20) 17a.	He shall feed His flock	Air S
(36) 32a.	Thou art gone up on high	Air B
(36) 32b.	Thou art gone up on high	Air S
(38) 34a.	How beautiful are the feet	Air S
(38) 34b.	How beautiful are the feet	Air A
(39) 35a.	Their sound is gone out	Chorus
(43)	Thou shalt break them	Rec. T

== Sources ==
- Messiah (Handel): Scores at the International Music Score Library Project
- Scores
  - Deutsche Händelgesellschaft Edition, edited by Friedrich Chrysander, 1902
  - Novello Edition, edited by Watkins Shaw, first published in 1959, revised and issued 1965
  - Bärenreiter Edition, edited by John Tobin, published in 1965
  - Peters Edition, edited by Donald Burrows, vocal score published 1972
  - Handel's Messiah at the Center for Computer Assisted Research in the Humanities
