= Andreas Holschneider =

German music historian and writer (1931–2019)

Andreas Holschneider (6 April 1931 – 24 September 2019) was a German music historian and writer.

== Life ==
Holschneider was born in 1931 in Freiburg im Breisgau as the oldest of four sons of the chemist Friedrich Wilhelm Holschneider and Olga Holschneider, née Krafft. He studied piano with Edith Picht-Axenfeld at the Hochschule für Musik Freiburg where he received his concert diploma in 1956, then studied musicology and Romance studies and was awarded the degree "pianist" (Dr. phil.) in 1960 with a thesis on Handel's Messias in Mozart's arrangement at the Eberhard Karls Universität Tübingen.

After a one-year research stay in Italy to study sources for the Neue Mozart-Ausgabe, he became an assistant at the Musicological Institute of Hamburg University. He got his habilitation there with a thesis on the earliest counterpoint music pieces in the Middle Ages. In 1970 he took over the management of the Archiv Produktion of Deutsche Grammophon. After various stages of his career within Deutsche Grammophon Gesellschaft, he became Managing Director and President of Deutsche Grammophon in 1987.

Holschneider lived in Baden-Baden until his death there in September 2019 at age 88.

== Publications ==
=== Articles ===
- Wolfgang Amadeus Mozart. Neue Ausgabe sämtlicher Werke. (Internationale Stiftung Mozarteum, Salzburg, Bärenreiter) Serie X, Werkgruppe 28, volumes 1–4: Bearbeitung von Werken Georg Friedrich Händels "Acis und Galatea", "Messias", "Das Alexander-Fest", "Ode auf St. Cäcilia" daselbst
- Bühnenwerke Serie X, volume 13 "L'Oca del Cairo", Addendum and crit. Report.

=== Books ===
- Die Organa von Winchester. Studien zum ältesten Repertoire polyphoner Musik. Olms, Hildesheim 1967, DNB-IDN 482229039. (Habilitation).
- Was bedeutet uns Franz Liszt?. (Veröffentlichung der Joachim-Jungius-Gesellschaft der Wissenschaften. No. 31). Vandenhoeck & Ruprecht, Göttingen 1977, ISBN 3-525-85557-5.
- Der Tod am Klavier. August von Goethe Literaturverlag, Frankfurt 2002, ISBN 3-8267-5106-X; 2., revised edition 2017, ISBN 978-3-8372-1988-3.
- Sarah Florimath. Eine Kriminalgeschichte. August von Goethe Literaturverlag, Frankfurt 2017, ISBN 978-3-8372-1975-3.
