= Portrait of George Frideric Handel =

Painting by Thomas Hudson

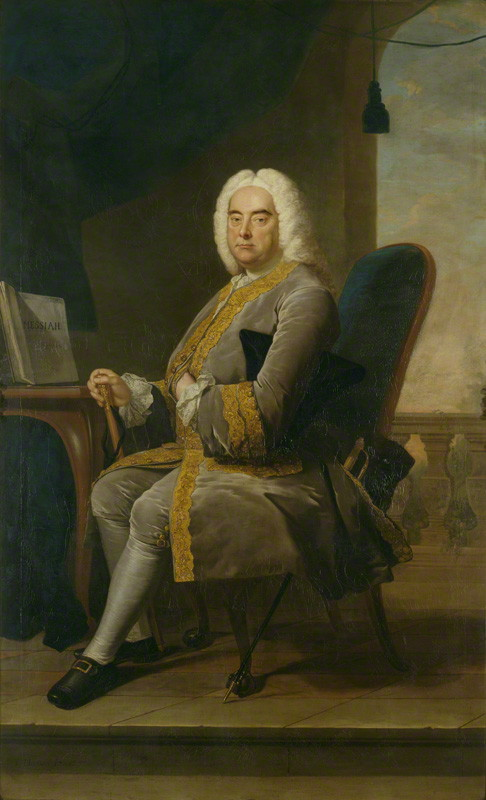
- Artist: Thomas Hudson
- Year: 1756
- Type: Oil on canvas, portrait
- Dimensions: 238.8 cm × 146.1 cm (94.0 in × 57.5 in)
- Location: National Portrait Gallery; London

Portrait of George Frideric Handel is a 1756 portrait painting by the English artist Thomas Hudson depicting the German composer George Frideric Handel.

Long resident in Britain, Handel was the foremost composer in the country. He was noted for his coronation anthems and his 1741 oratorio Messiah amongst his many works. He is shown in his early seventies. The work was commissioned by his friend Charles Jennens. Handel is seated in front of the score of Messiah, which Jennens had worked on the libretto of.

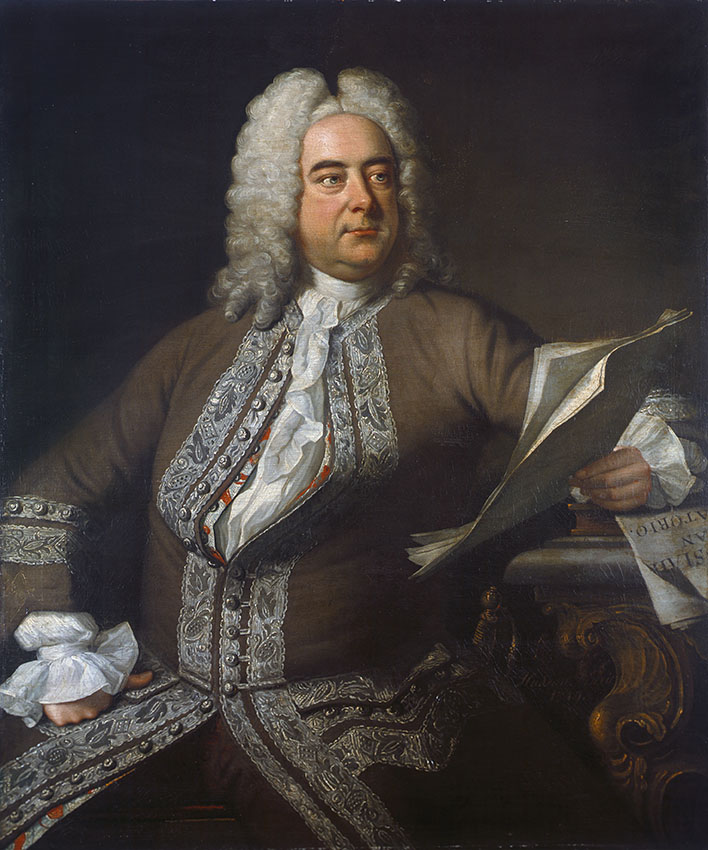
1749 portrait of Handel by Hudson

Hudson was a notable portraitist of the mid-Georgian era who counted Joshua Reynolds amongst his pupils. Hudson has previously painted Handel in 1749. Today the work is in the collection of the National Portrait Gallery, in London, having been acquired in 1968.

== See also ==
- Portrait of George II, a 1744 painting by Hudson of Handel's royal patron

== Bibliography ==
- Blakeman, Edward. The Faber Pocket Guide to Handel. Faber & Faber, 2011.
- Leach, Stephen. Joseph Wright and the Final Farewell. Cambridge Scholars Publishing, 2022.
- McIntyre, Ian. Joshua Reynolds: The Life and Times of the First President of the Royal Academy. Allen Lane, 2003.
