= Messiah Part III =

Third part of Handel's English-language oratorio Messiah

Messiah
- (Part III)
- by George Frideric Handel
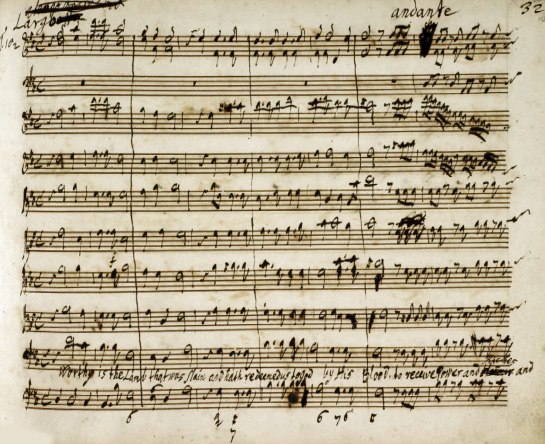
- Beginning of "Worthy is the Lamb", ending Part III, in Handel's manuscript
- Year: 1741
- Period: Baroque
- Genre: Oratorio
- Text: Charles Jennens, a compilation from the King James Bible and the Book of Common Prayer
- Composed: 22 August 1741 – 14 September 1741: London
- Movements: 9 in four scenes
- Vocal: SATB choir and solo
- Instrumental: 2 trumpets; timpani; 2 oboes; 2 violins; viola; basso continuo

Messiah (HWV 56), the English-language oratorio composed by George Frideric Handel in 1741, is structured in three parts. This listing covers Part III in a table and comments on individual movements, reflecting the relation of the musical setting to the text. Part I begins with the prophecy of the Messiah and his birth, shows the annunciation to the shepherds as a scene from the Gospel of Luke, and reflects the Messiah's deeds on Earth. Part II covers the Passion, death, resurrection, ascension, and the later spreading of the Gospel. Part III concentrates on Paul's teaching of the resurrection of the dead and Christ's glorification in heaven.

== Messiah, the oratorio ==
The libretto by Charles Jennens is entirely drawn from the Bible, mostly from the King James Bible, whereas several psalms are taken from the Book of Common Prayer. The librettist commented: "... the Subject excells every other Subject. The Subject is Messiah ...". Messiah differs from Handel's other oratorios by telling no story, instead offering reflections on different aspects of the Christian Messiah. Christopher Hogwood comments:

Messiah is not a typical Handel oratorio; there are no named characters, as are usually found in Handel’s setting of the Old Testament stories, possibly to avoid charges of blasphemy. It is a meditation rather than a drama of personalities, lyrical in method; the narration of the story is carried on by implication, and there is no dialogue.

— Christopher Hogwood

=== Structure and concept ===
The oratorio's structure follows the liturgical year; Part I corresponding with Advent, Christmas and the life of Jesus, Part II with Lent, Easter, Ascension and Pentecost, Part III with the end of the church year, dealing with the end of time, the Resurrection of the dead and Christ's glorification in heaven. The sources are drawn mostly from the Old Testament. Even the birth and death of Jesus are told in the words of the prophet Isaiah, the most prominent source of the libretto. The only true scene of the oratorio is taken from the Gospel of Luke, the annunciation to the shepherds. The imagery of shepherd and lamb features prominently, in the aria "He shall feed His flock like a shepherd", the only extended piece to talk about the Messiah on earth, in the opening of Part II, "Behold the Lamb of God", in the chorus "All we like sheep", and in the closing chorus of the work, "Worthy is the Lamb". Occasionally verses from different biblical sources are combined in one movement, but more often a coherent text section is set in different consecutive movements, such as the first "scene", the annunciation of Christian salvation, as a sequence of three movements, recitative, aria and chorus.

=== Music ===
When Handel composed Messiah in London, he was already a successful and experienced composer of Italian operas. He had started in 1713 to also compose sacred music on English texts, such as the Utrecht Te Deum and Jubilate. He set many oratorios on English libretti. In Messiah he used practically the same musical means as for those works, namely a structure based on chorus and solo singing. Only a few movements are a duet or a combination of solo and chorus. The solos are typically a combination of recitative and aria. The arias are called Air or Song, some of them have da capo form, but rarely in a strict sense, repeating a first section after a sometimes contrasting middle section. Handel finds various ways to use the format freely, in order to convey the text. The movements marked "Recitative" (Rec.) are "secco", only accompanied by the basso continuo. Recitatives marked "Accompagnato" (Acc.) are accompanied by additional string instruments. Handel uses four voice parts in both solo and chorus, soprano (S), alto (A), tenor (T) and bass (B). Only once is the chorus divided in an upper chorus and a lower chorus, it is SATB otherwise. The orchestra scoring is simple: oboes, strings and basso continuo of harpsichord, violoncello, violone and bassoon. Two trumpets and timpani highlight selected movements, such as the closing movements of Part II, Hallelujah. Handel uses a cantus firmus on long repeated notes especially to illustrate God's speech and majesty, such as "King of Kings" in the Hallelujah chorus.

=== General notes ===
The following table is organized by movement numbers. There are two major systems of numbering the movements of Messiah: the historic Novello edition of 1959 (which is based on earlier editions and contains 53 movements), and the Bärenreiter edition of 1965 in the Hallische Händel-Ausgabe. Not counting some short recitatives as separate movements, there are therefore 47 movements. In the table below, the Novello number (Nov) is given first and is the index for the notes to individual movements in the "movements" section, then the Bärenreiter number (Bär).

To emphasise the movements in which the oboes and the rarely used trumpets play, the Scoring column lists instruments beyond the regular strings and basso continuo (harpsichord, violoncello, violone) that play throughout. Details on the development of keys, different tempo markings and times within a movement are given in notes on the individual movements. Typically a "scene" of recitative(s) and aria(s) is concluded with a choral movement.

== Part III ==
| Nov | Bär | Title / First line | Form | Tempo marking | Scoring | Time | Key |
|---|---|---|---|---|---|---|---|
| 45 | 40 | I know that my Redeemer liveth | Air, soprano | Larghetto | | 3/4 | E major |
| 46 | 41 | Since by man came death by man came also the resurrection | Chorus | Grave; Allegro | 2 oboes | common time | A minor C major |
| 47 | 42 | Behold, I tell you a mystery | Accompagnato, bass | | | common time | D major |
| 48 | 43 | The trumpet shall sound | Air, bass | Pomposo, ma non allegro | trumpet | 3/4 | D major |
| 49 | | Then shall be brought to pass | Recitative, alto | Allegro | | common time | B♭ major |
| 50 | 44 | O death, where is thy sting? | Duet, alto tenor | Andante | | common time | E♭ major |
| 51 | 45 | But thanks be to God | Chorus | Andante | 2 oboes | common time | E♭ major |
| 52 | 46 | If God be for us | Air, soprano or alto | Larghetto | | 3/4 | G minor (soprano) / C minor (alto) |
| 53 | 47 | Worthy is the Lamb to receive power Blessing and honour Amen | Chorus | Largo; Andante; Larghetto; Allegro moderato | 2 oboes, 2 trumpets, timpani | common time | D major |

== Part III movements ==
=== Scene 1 ===
Scene 1 tells in an aria and a chorus of the resurrection, based on the Messianic anticipation in the Book of Job (Job 19:25–26) and Paul's teaching in his first epistle to the Corinthians (1 Corinthians 15:20–22).

==== 45 ====
I know that my redeemer liveth
1953: Hermann Scherchen directing the London Symphony Orchestra and London Philharmonic Choir; Margaret Ritchie, soprano; Constance Schacklock, contralto; William Herbert, tenor; Richard Standen, bass; Frederick Jackson, chorus master; Thomas Matthews, violin; George Eskdale, trumpet.

I know that my Redeemer liveth

The aria for soprano "I know that my Redeemer liveth" draws from both Job and Paul. The words are "an expression of faith in redemption" and announce the Second Coming of Christ. The aria begins with an ascending fourth, a signal observed by musicologist Rudolf Steglich as a unifying motif of the oratorio, on the words "I know", repeated almost every time these words appear again. "For now is Christ risen" is pictured in a steadily rising melody of more than an octave.

The music appears to be a reworking of arias from previous operas, with similarities between motifs that appear in Acis and Galatea ("Must I my Acis still bemoan?"), the aria that opens Act II of Riccardo primo, Se m’è contrario il Cielo, e che sperar potrò frà tante pene ("If heaven is against me, what hope is there for me in all this trouble?"), and multiple others. The creative recasting and transformation of previous ideas in new works is a process which was often employed by Handel.

The significance of this "much-loved" aria is also indicated by the bust of the composer erected as a memorial in Westminster Abbey, which bears a figure of the composer working on the manuscript for this aria in a "moment of inspiration". Much recorded as a stand-alone number, the melody of the aria has also been reworked as a hymn tune, most often set to either a paraphrase by Charles Wesley which shares the incipit of the aria, or to a translation of a 7th or 8th century latin text by John Chandler, beginning "O Christ, our hope, our heart's desire".

==== 46 ====
Since by man came death

Since by man came death

The text for the chorus "Since by man came death" continues Paul's thoughts, juxtaposing death and resurrection twice. Consequently, Handel twice uses a Grave a cappella setting in A minor with chromatic lines, opposed to an Allegro with orchestra in C major in most simple harmony, switching back and forth between these extremes.

=== Scene 2 ===
Scene 2 deals with Paul's teachings on the Resurrection of the body on the Day of Judgement, as written in his First Epistle to the Corinthians. Accompagnato and Air share three verses, 1 Corinthians 15:51–53. Handel breaks the text in the middle of the second verse, to open the aria with the musical idea "the trumpet shall sound". The image, first found in Exodus 19, pictures a courtly herald who blew the trumpet as a signal that the king was about to enter the throne room, a signal to stand in his honour. The passage from 1 Corinthians 15 was also chosen by Johannes Brahms for Ein deutsches Requiem, but in the German translation of the Bible the instrument is a trombone.

==== 47 ====
Behold, I tell you a mystery

Behold, I tell you a mystery

"Behold, I tell you a mystery" is rendered as a bass accompagnato in D major. Towards the end, motifs like trumpet signals appear in the strings even before the last words "at the last trumpet".

==== 48 ====
The trumpet shall sound

The trumpet shall sound

The Air for bass "The trumpet shall sound", marked "Pomposo, ma non allegro", is a da capo aria. In the work's only instrumental solo, the trumpet provides motifs which the bass picks up. In "and we shall be changed", the word "changed" is treated in inventive ever-changing melismas of up to six measures. In the middle section, the word "immortality" is expressed in a lively melisma of first eight, then nine measures.

=== Scene 3 ===
Scene 3 first continues the text of Scene 2 (1 Corinthians 15:54–57), presented in recitative, duet and chorus, and ends with an Air on Paul's Assurance of salvation, as written in the Epistle to the Romans, Romans 8:31,33–34.

==== 49 ====
Then shall be brought to pass

Then shall be brought to pass

An alto recitative delivers "Then shall be brought to pass", ending on "death is swallow'd up in victory".

==== 50 ====
O death, where is thy sting?

O death, where is thy sting?

"O death, where is thy sting?" is sung as a duet in E♭ major of alto and tenor on a walking bass of the continuo, without strings. The movement is based on the duet for soprano and alto "Se tu non lasci amore" (HWV 193, 1722). Such a movement would remind the London listeners of love duets concluding operas, such as the final scene of Giulio Cesare.

==== 51 ====
But thanks be to God

But thanks be to God

The chorus answers in the same key and tempo "But thanks be to God".

==== 52 ====
If God be for us, who can be against us

If God be for us, who can be against us

The scene closes with the assurance "If God be for us, who can be against us". As a contrast to the following choral conclusion of the oratorio, it is sung by the soprano. Towards the end, Handel quotes the characteristic intervals beginning Martin Luther's chorale Aus tiefer Not schrei ich zu dir several times, leading into the final chorus.

=== Scene 4 ===
Scene 4 closes the work by visionary verses from the Book of Revelation, The creatures in heaven give praise (Revelation 5:12–13), affirmed by an extended Amen.

==== 53 ====
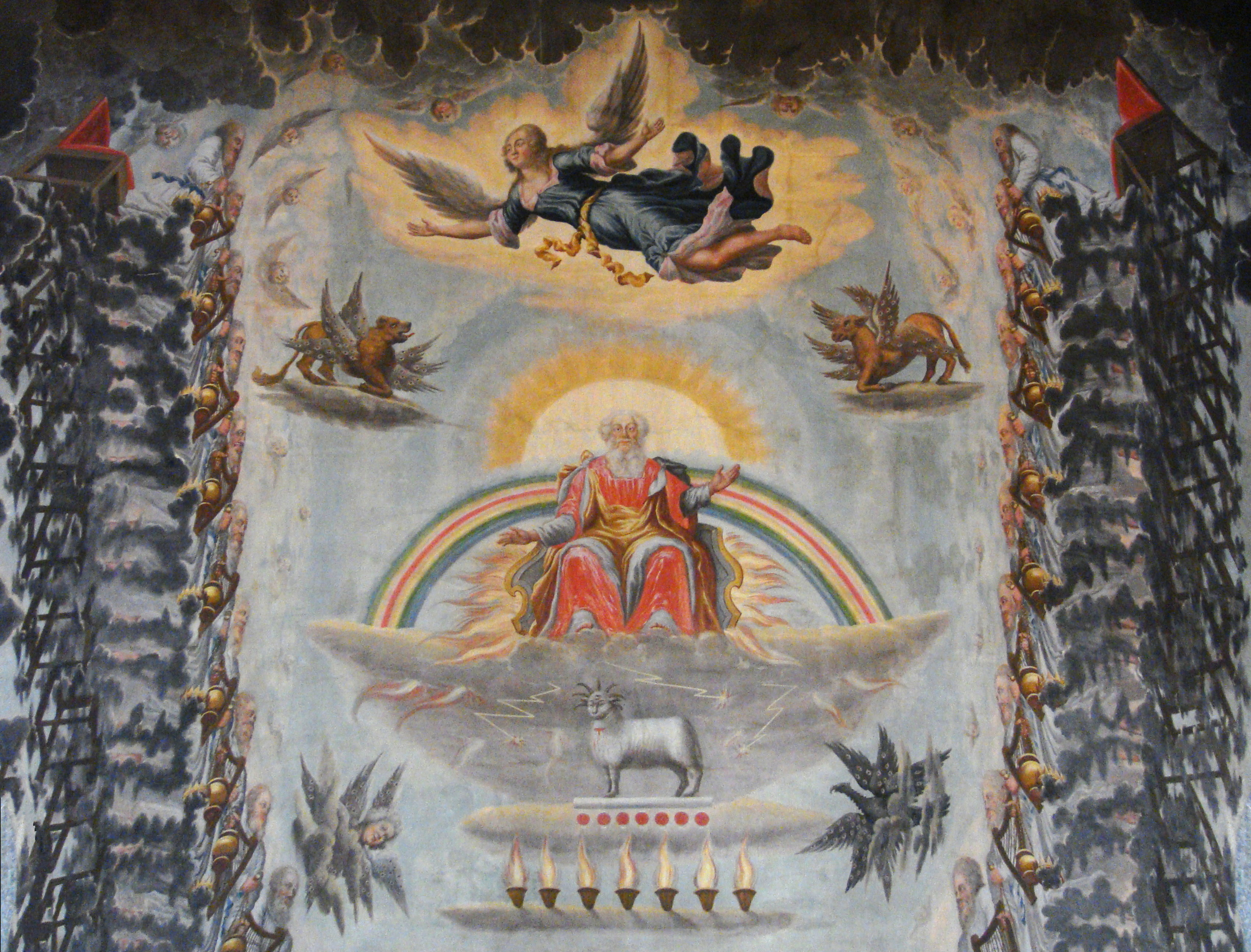
"Worthy is the Lamb", ceiling of Unionskirche, Idstein, c. 1670

Worthy is the Lamb that was slain, Amen.

Worthy is the Lamb that was slain

The chorus, with the full orchestra including trumpets and timpani, proclaims in a solemn Largo "Worthy is the Lamb that was slain", and continues Andante "to receive power – and riches, – and wisdom, – and strength, – and honour, – and glory, – and blessing". The sequence of Largo and Andante is repeated, but not exactly the same music. A fugue carries the words "Blessing and honour, glory and pow'r be unto him". The men's voices and the continuo begin in unison, the simple theme rises to a note which is repeated nine times and falls back, reminiscent of the repeated notes in "For the mouth of the Lord hath spoken it" and "King of Kings". Several countersubjects add life and texture, gradually more instruments take part in the development on "for ever – and ever". These words are rendered in short downward runs, but then also in the same rhythm as in the Hallelujah chorus, and finally broadened to Adagio. The "Amen" begins again simply in the bass and continuo. An intricate melody rises in four measures and one octave. Every other voice, tenor, alto, soprano, also sings the theme once. Rather unexpectedly, a solo violin plays the theme, first unsupported, then assisted by a continuo entrance of the theme, interrupted by a choral four-part setting with the theme in the bass. After two more instrumental measures, a four-part-setting develops to imitation and counterpoint of more and more independent voices, ending on a rest of a full measure. Finally, Amen is repeated two more times, Adagio.

A contemporary critic, conditioned by John Brown who objected to operatic features in oratorios such as recitatives, long ritornellos, and ornamented vocal lines, commented on Handel's display of musical inventiveness and "contrapuntal skill": "The fugue too, on Amen, is entirely absurd, and without reason: at most, Amen is only a devout fiat, and ought never, therefore, to have been frittered, as it is, by endless divisions on A— and afterwards men." But Handel's first biographer, John Mainwaring, wrote in 1760 that this conclusion revealed the composer "rising still higher" than in "that vast effort of genius, the Hallelujah chorus". Christopher Hogwood comments: "the entry of the trumpets marks the final storming of heaven". Daniel I. Block summarized in 1997: "in this piece we see the remarkable confluence of Hebrew theology and biblical truth, Italian operatic genius, English class, and German piety."

== See also ==
- Messiah (Handel)
- Structure of Handel's Messiah
- Messiah Part I
- Messiah Part II
