= Messiah Part I =

First part of Handel's English-language oratorio Messiah

Messiah
- (Part I)
- by George Frideric Handel
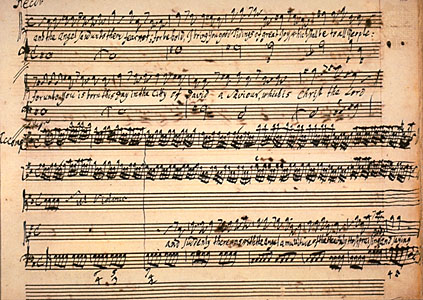
- Manuscript of Nos. 15–16, Annunciation to the shepherds
- Year: 1741
- Period: Baroque
- Genre: Oratorio
- Text: Charles Jennens, a compilation from the King James Bible and the Book of Common Prayer
- Composed: 22 August 1741 – 14 September 1741: London
- Movements: 21 in five scenes
- Vocal: SATB choir and solo
- Instrumental: 2 trumpets; 2 oboes; 2 violins; viola; basso continuo

Messiah (HWV 56), the English-language oratorio composed by George Frideric Handel in 1741, is structured in three parts. The wordbook (also called libretto or text) was supplied by Charles Jennens. This article covers Part I and describes the relation of the musical setting to the text. Part I begins with the prophecy of the Messiah and his virgin birth by several prophets, namely Isaiah. His birth is still rendered in words by Isaiah, followed by the annunciation to the shepherds as the only scene from a Gospel in the oratorio, and reflections on the Messiah's deeds. Part II covers the Passion, death, resurrection, ascension, and the later spreading of the Gospel. Part III concentrates on Paul's teaching of the resurrection of the dead and Christ's glorification in heaven.

The popular Part I of Messiah is sometimes called the "Christmas" portion as it is frequently performed during Advent in concert, sing-along, or as a Scratch Messiah. When performed in this way, it usually concludes with "Hallelujah" (chorus) from Part II as the finale.

== Messiah, the oratorio ==
The libretto by Jennens is drawn from the Bible: mostly from the Old Testament of the King James Bible, but with several psalms taken from the Book of Common Prayer. Regarding the text, Jennens commented: "...the Subject excells every other Subject. The Subject is Messiah ...".

Messiah differs from Handel's other oratorios in that it does not contain an encompassing narrative, instead offering contemplation on different aspects of the Christian Messiah:

Messiah is not a typical Handel oratorio; there are no named characters, as are usually found in Handel’s setting of the Old Testament stories, possibly to avoid charges of blasphemy. It is a meditation rather than a drama of personalities, lyrical in method; the narration of the story is carried on by implication, and there is no dialogue.

— Christopher Hogwood

=== Structure and concept ===
The oratorio's structure follows the liturgical year: Part I corresponding with Advent, Christmas, and the life of Jesus; Part II with Lent, Easter, the Ascension, and Pentecost; and Part III with the end of the church year—dealing with the end of time. The birth and death of Jesus are told in the words of the prophet Isaiah (the most prominent source for the libretto). The only true scene of the oratorio is the annunciation to the shepherds which is taken from the Gospel of Luke. The imagery of shepherd and lamb features prominently in many movements, for example: in the aria "He shall feed His flock like a shepherd" (the only extended piece to talk about the Messiah on earth), in the opening of Part II ("Behold the Lamb of God"), in the chorus "All we like sheep", and in the closing chorus of the work ("Worthy is the Lamb").

=== Music ===
By the time Handel composed Messiah in London he was already a successful and experienced composer of Italian operas, and had created sacred works based on English texts, such as the 1713 Utrecht Te Deum and Jubilate, and numerous oratorios on English libretti. For Messiah, Handel used the same musical technique as for those works, namely a structure based on chorus and solo singing.

Only two movements in Messiah are purely instrumental: the overture (written as "Sinfony" in Handel's autograph) and the Pifa (a pastorale introducing the shepherds in Bethlehem); and only a few movements are a duet or a combination of solo and chorus. The solos are typically a combination of recitative and aria. The arias are called Airs or Songs, and some of them are in da capo form, but rarely in a strict sense (repeating the first section after a sometimes contrasting middle section). Handel found various ways to use the format freely to convey the meaning of the text. Occasionally verses from different biblical sources are combined into one movement, however more often a coherent text section is set in consecutive movements, for example the first "scene" of the work, the annunciation of Salvation, is set as a sequence of three movements: recitative, aria and chorus.

The movements marked "Recitative" are "secco", accompanied by only the continuo, whereas the recitatives marked "Accompagnato" are accompanied by additional string instruments. Handel used four voice parts, soprano, alto, tenor and bass in the solo and choral movements. The orchestra scoring is simple: oboes, strings and basso continuo of harpsichord, violoncello, violone and bassoon. Two trumpets and timpani highlight selected movements, for example in Part I the song of the angels Glory to God in the highest. Handel uses both polyphonic and homophonic settings to illustrate the text best. Even polyphonic movements typically end on a dramatic long musical rest, followed by a broad homophonic conclusion. Handel often stresses a word by extended coloraturas, especially in several movements which are a parody of music composed earlier on Italian texts. He uses a cantus firmus on long repeated notes especially to illustrate God's speech and majesty, for example "for the mouth of the Lord has spoken it" in movement 4.

=== General notes ===
The following table is organized by movement numbers. There are two major systems of numbering the movements of Messiah: the historic Novello edition of 1959 (which is based on earlier editions and contains 53 movements), and the Bärenreiter edition of 1965 in the Hallische Händel-Ausgabe. Not counting some short recitatives as separate movements, there are therefore 47 movements. In the table below, the Novello number (Nov) is given first and is the index for the notes to individual movements in the "movements" section, then the Bärenreiter number (Bär).

To emphasise the movements in which the oboes and the rarely used trumpets play, the Scoring column lists instruments beyond the regular strings and basso continuo (harpsichord, violoncello, violone) that play throughout. Details on the development of keys, different tempo markings and times within a movement are given in notes on the individual movements. Typically a "scene" of recitative(s) and aria(s) is concluded with a choral movement.

== Part I summary ==
| Nov | Bär | Title / First line | Form | Voice | Tempo marking | Scoring | Time | Key |
|---|---|---|---|---|---|---|---|---|
| 1 | 1 | Sinfony | French overture | Instrumental | Grave; Allegro moderato | 2 oboes | common time | E minor |
| 2 | 2 | Comfort ye, comfort ye my people saith your God | Accompagnato | Tenor | Larghetto e piano | | common time | E major |
| 3 | 3 | Ev'ry valley shall be exalted | Aria | Tenor | Andante | | common time | E major |
| 4 | 4 | And the glory ... of the Lord shall be revealed | Chorus | | Allegro | 2 oboes | 3/4 | A major |
| 5 | 5 | Thus saith the Lord of Hosts; Behold, I will send my messenger | Accompagnato | Bass | | | common time | D minor |
| 6 | 6 | But who may abide the day of his coming For he is like a refiner's fire | Aria | Soprano, Alto, or Bass | Larghetto; Prestissimo | | 3/8 | D minor (alto and bass) / A minor (soprano) |
| 7 | 7 | And He shall purify the sons of Levi | Chorus | | Allegro | 2 oboes | common time | G minor |
| 8 | 8 | Behold, a virgin shall conceive | Recitative | Alto | | | common time | D major |
| 9 | 8 | O thou that tellest good tidings to Zion | Aria | Alto, Chorus | Andante | 2 oboes (chorus) | 6/8 | D major |
| 10 | 9 | For behold, darkness shall cover the earth | Accompagnato | Bass | Andante larghetto | | common time | B minor |
| 11 | 10 | The people that walked in darkness | Aria | Bass | Larghetto | | common time | B minor |
| 12 | 11 | For unto us a Child is born | Chorus | | Andante allegro | 2 oboes | common time | G major |
| 13 | 12 | Pifa | Pastorale | Instrumental | Larghetto e mezzo piano | | 12/8 | C major |
| 14 | | There were shepherds abiding in the fields | Recitative | Soprano | | | common time | C major |
| 15 | 13 | And lo, the angel of the Lord came upon them | Accompagnato | Soprano | Andante | | common time | F major |
| | | And the angel said unto them | Recitative | Soprano | | | common time | A major |
| 16 | 14 | And suddenly there was with angel | Accompagnato | Soprano | Allegro | | common time | D major |
| 17 | 15 | Glory to God in the highest | Chorus | | Allegro | 2 oboes, 2 trumpets | common time | D major |
| 18 | 16 | Rejoice greatly O daughters of Zion | Aria | Soprano or Tenor | Allegro | | or 12/8 | B♭ major |
| 19 | | Then shall the eyes of the blind shall be open'd | Recitative | Alto or Soprano | | | common time | D major (alto) / G major (soprano) |
| 20 | 17 | He shall feed His flock like a shepherd Come unto Him | Aria or Duet | Alto or Soprano (Aria); Alto & Soprano (Duet) | Larghetto e piano | | 12/8 | F major (alto) / B♭ major (soprano) |
| 21 | 18 | His yoke is easy, his burden is light | Chorus | | Allegro | 2 oboes | common time | B♭ major |

== Part I movements ==
=== 1 ===
Sinfony
1953: Hermann Scherchen directing the London Symphony Orchestra and London Philharmonic Choir; Margaret Ritchie, soprano; Constance Schacklock, contralto; William Herbert, tenor; Richard Standen, bass; Frederick Jackson, chorus master; Thomas Matthews, violin; George Eskdale, trumpet.

Sinfony

The Sinfony, set for oboes and strings, is in two parts in the style of a French overture (a slow first part and a fugue). The fugue subject is presented by the unaccompanied violins, which is a feature that returns in the final Amen of the oratorio. The key of E minor has been interpreted as creating "a mood without hope".

=== Scene 1 ===
Scene 1 deals with general prophecies of salvation. In three movements, five consecutive verses from the Book of Isaiah are treated—foretelling the return to Jerusalem (Isaiah 40:1–5) following the Babylonian captivity.

==== 2 ====
Comfort ye my people

Comfort ye, comfort ye my people

The first vocal movement (a tenor accompagnato) is based on three verses—the words of God beginning with "Comfort ye, comfort ye my people".

==== 3 ====
Ev’ry valley shall be exalted

Ev'ry valley shall be exalted

The Air for tenor expands the words "Ev'ry valley shall be exalted", which are frequently heard during Advent (preparing a way for the Lord). The voice illustrates the exaltation by long coloraturas, whereas "plain" is depicted with a long note. More word painting occurs in a low note for "low" and a complicated figure for "crooked".

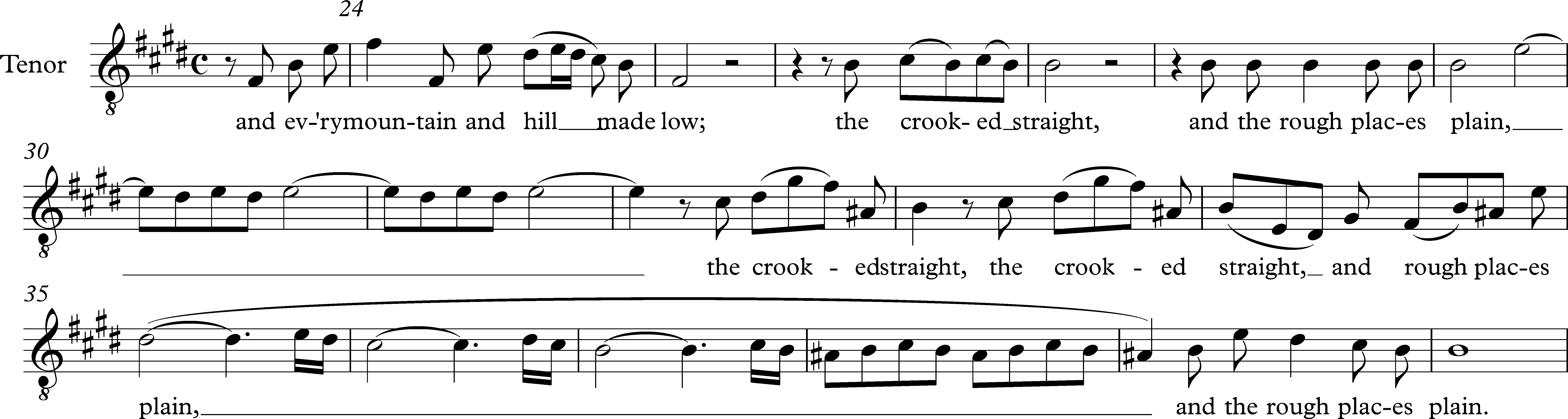

==== 4 ====
The glory of the Lord”

And the glory, the glory of the Lord

The chorus enters the work for the first time, and joined by the oboes, announces the revelation of God's glory: "And the glory, the glory of the Lord". The alto begins, the other voices answer (mostly homophonically), and gradually the music grows to a denser texture. The words "for the mouth of the Lord has spoken it" are set as a cantus firmus of solemn and repeated long notes, which appear first in single voices, and then after a long rest, conclude the movement in affirmative homophony.

=== Scene 2 ===
Scene 2 speaks in three movements of the apparition of God. An accompagnato is based on the words of the prophet Haggai, dealing with the splendor of the temple, and of Malachi who foretold the coming messenger. Malachi's words are continued in an aria and a chorus.

==== 5 ====
Thus saith the Lord

Thus saith the Lord

The bass begins the accompagnato: "Thus saith the Lord". Again the words of the Lord, as told by the prophet Haggai (Haggai 2:6–7) are given to a single male voice. In "and I will shake all nations", the "shake" is rendered several times in downward coloraturas of more than a measure, and in "and the desire of all nations shall come" the word "desire" is rendered once in upward coloraturas of more than two measures, accompanied by exited repetitions in the strings and continuo. The music then suddenly calms to an unaccompanied line on the words of the prophet Malachi: "The Lord, whom you seek, shall suddenly come to his temple" (Malachi 3:1).

==== 6 ====
But who may abide

But who may abide

The prophecy continues in two movements. The Air for soprano, alto, or bass, as a human reaction to the words of God, shows the trembling in the expectation of the Lord's appearance twofold in a dramatic scene. The Air begins with the pensive question "But who may abide" and continues, in a sharp shift of time and tempo "Prestissimo", with the statement "For He is like a refiner's fire". Forceful downward runs, leaps and trills of the voice are accompanied by fiery figuration in the strings. Like a da capo, the pensive question is repeated, but in a short version, giving way once more to a prestissimo section. The statement returns a final time after a rest, marked Adagio, giving the soloist the opportunity to express it in a cadenza. A prestissimo postlude concludes the dramatic scene. Handel rewrote this dramatic scene in London in 1750 for the castrato Gaetano Guadagni, after he had initially set the text as a recitative for bass.

==== 7 ====
And he shall purify

And he shall purify

The chorus picks up the idea in the fugue "And he shall purify", with coloraturas on "purify", which may stand for a purifying fire. The movement is a parody of Quel fior che all'alba ride (HWV 192, July 1741).

=== Scene 3 ===
After the rather general introduction, Scene 3 addresses Isaiah's specific prophecy about the virgin birth of a Messiah by expanding more verses from different chapters of the prophet.

==== 8 ====
Behold, a virgin shall conceive

Behold, a virgin shall conceive

"Behold, a virgin shall conceive" (Isaiah 7:14) is rendered in a short alto recitative, to be called "Emmanuel", translated to "God – with us", sung with a rest after "God". This very prophecy is quoted in the Gospel of Matthew (Matthew 1:23).

==== 9 ====
O thou that tellest good tidings to Zion

O thou that tellest good tidings to Zion

As if the good news was spreading, the solo alto begins "O thou that tellest good tidings to Zion" (Isaiah 40:9), and is taken over by the chorus. It is the first music in a swinging 6/8 time. Coloraturas accent the words "mountain" and "glory", and the words "God" and "Lord" are set in long notes. The choir voices enter in imitation, as if gathering, but soon sing together, starting with "arise" (Isaiah 60:1) on a pronounced "ascending fourth"—a signal observed by musicologist Rudolf Steglich as a unifying motif of the oratorio.

==== 10 ====
For behold, darkness shall cover the earth

For behold, darkness shall cover the earth

In stark contrast, the bass sings the continuation in an accompagnato "For behold, darkness shall cover the earth" (Isaiah 60:2–3) on a background of the strings playing mysterious repeated motifs in major and minor seconds, until the text switches to "but the Lord shall arise" (which the voice presents as a melisma of two measures), followed by coloraturas on "glory" and an upward octave leap to proclaim in the end "and kings [to the brightness of thy rising]".

==== 11 ====
The people that walked in darkness

The people that walked in darkness

Although the text "The people that walked in darkness" is taken from a different chapter of Isaiah (Isaiah 9:2), Handel treats the aria as a continuation of the accompagnato by similar motifs. The darkness is illustrated by all strings in unison, starting with the seconds of the previous movement and proceeding in uneven steps, carefully marked for irregular phrasing. On "have seen a great light", the melody begins to leap, and finally reaches on the word "light" a long high note which the voice holds, while the celli continue their movement. The next occurrence of "darkness" is a broken downward melisma. In the second verse of the text, the gloom of the beginning is intensified by similar unsupported figures on "shadow of death", but once more relieved by "upon them has the light shined", again with the voice singing independently. The aria is not da capo, but follows exactly the two verses from the Old Testament poetry, where the second verse typically parallels the thought of the first.

==== 12 ====
For unto us a Child is born

For unto us a Child is born

The choir concludes the scene, telling the news of Christmas, the birth of a son, "For unto us a Child is born", in Isaiah's words (Isaiah 9:6). Marked piano, the sopranos enter a fugue first, singing a delicate theme with many rests. Their countersubject to the tenors' entry is a shimmering coloratura for more than three measures. The words "and the government shall be upon his shoulders" appears in stately dotted rhythm, culminating in the names "Won-derful", "Coun-selor", "The Mighty God", "The Everlasting Father", "The Prince – of Peace", with the shimmering coloratura in the strings. A second and third round of the development from the tender "child is born" to the proclamation "Prince of Peace" is crowned by the fourth round, with the theme in the bass and the countersubject in soprano and alto in parallel thirds.

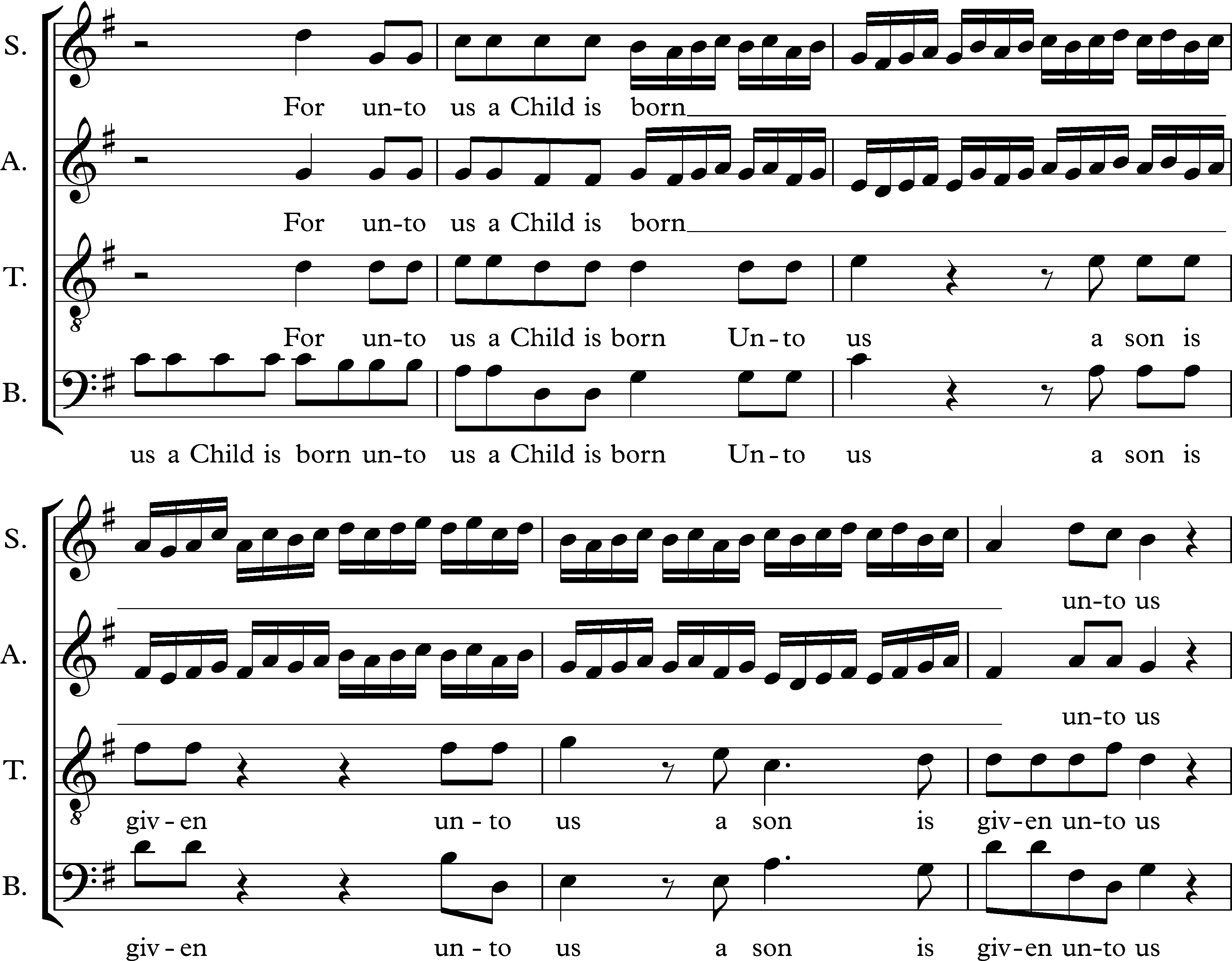

The movement is based on the first section of Handel's Italian cantata No, di voi non vo' fidarmi (HWV 189, July 1741), which had "originally expressed a distinctly secular kind of joy".

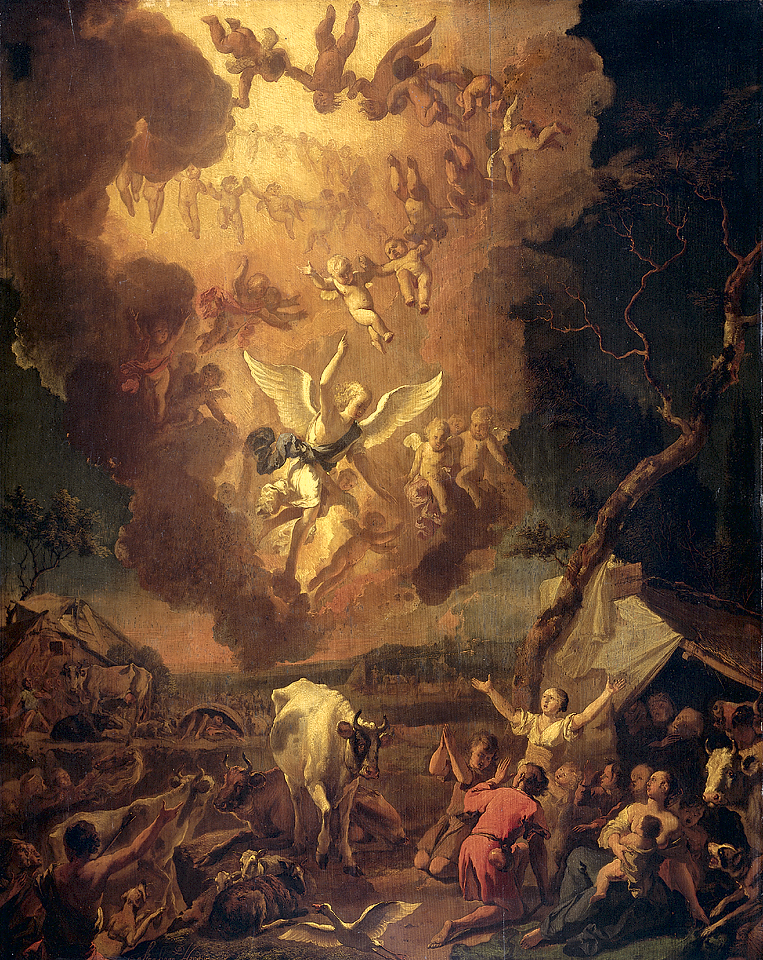
The Annunciation to the Shepherds, by Abraham Hondius, 1663

=== Scene 4 ===
Scene 4 is the only real scene of the oratorio: the annunciation to the shepherds, and is taken from the Gospel of Luke, Luke 2:14. This is an episode in the Nativity of Jesus described in the Bible in Luke 2, in which angels tell a group of shepherds about the birth of Jesus. It is a common subject of Christian art and of Christmas carols.

==== 13 ====
Pifa

The shepherds are introduced by an instrumental Pastorale, the Pifa, which takes its name from the shepherd-bagpipers, or pifferai, who played in the streets of Rome at Christmas time. The music in C major and swinging 12/8 time gently rises and falls like a cradle song (i.e. lullaby).

Pifa

==== 14 ====
There were shepherds abiding in the field

In a short recitative, the soprano tells "There were shepherds abiding in the field". Handel saved the soprano solo voice until this point in the narration.

There were shepherds

==== 15 ====
And lo, the angel of the lord

The angel said unto them

And lo, the angel of the Lord came upon them

Vivid string accompaniment, as of wings in action, illuminates the accompagnato "And lo, the angel of the Lord came upon them" which is sung by the soprano. With "And the angel said unto them", the soprano delivers in simple recitative the message "Fear not". The upward fourth, followed by a rest, stresses the phrases "for behold", "good tidings", "for unto you" and ultimately "which is Christ".

==== 16 ====
And suddenly there was with the angel

And suddenly there was with the angel

With "And suddenly there was with the angel", the soprano continues to tell of the arrival of "a multitude of the heav'nly host". Singing more fourths and rests on "And suddenly" and "praising God", the music is supported by an even more vibrant accompaniment of the violins.

==== 17 ====
Glory to God

Glory to God

Handel waited until the angels' song "Glory to God" to introduce the trumpets. He marked them as "da lontano e un poco piano" (from afar and somewhat quietly) and originally planned to place them offstage (in disparate), to create the effect of distance. In this initial appearance the trumpets appear without the regular timpani. Handel's setting of the famous words is strikingly simple and effective: "Glory to God, glory to God in the highest" is sung by the high voices (soprano, alto and tenor), whereas "and peace on earth" is given to the low voices of tenor and bass in unison, with the bass dropping an octave for "on earth". In great contrast, "goodwill towards men" is sung in a fast sequence of entries in imitation, with the word "goodwill" on another upward fourth. The sequence is repeated, but this time all four voices sing "glory" and "peace", the first in a high register, then low again with the bass dropping an octave. After the song the angels disappear, diminuendo, gradually thinned out in instrumentation, with more and more rests, and always rising.

=== Scene 5 ===
Scene 5 summarizes the deeds of the Messiah on earth and the response of man. The text is compiled from Zechariah (who saw God's providential dealings), Isaiah's oracle of salvation for Israel, and his vision of the Shepherd (seen fulfilled by the Evangelist Matthew).

==== 18 ====
Rejoice greatly

Rejoice greatly, O daughter of Zion

"Rejoice greatly, O daughter of Zion" (Zechariah 9:9–10) is usually performed as a virtuoso coloratura aria of the soprano which might express any kind of great joy—as seen in an opera—although the original version is an utterly charming Baroque dance in 12/8 time. An upward fourth followed by a rest accents "Rejoice", and further repeats of the word are rendered as seemingly endless coloraturas. "Behold, thy King cometh unto thee" is given in dotted rhythm and is reminiscent of the French overture. The middle section tells in mellow movement "He is the righteous Saviour and he shall speak peace unto the heathen"—with "peace" repeated several times as a long note. Finally, a da capo seems to begin, but only the first entry of the voice is exactly the same, followed by even more varied coloraturas and embellishments to end the aria.

==== 19 ====
Then shall the eyes of the blind

Then shall the eyes of the blind be open'd

In prophetic words of Isaiah, the alto (originally soprano) recitative relates the Saviour's actions: "Then shall the eyes of the blind be open'd ... and the tongue of the dumb shall sing" (Isaiah 35:5–6).

==== 20 ====
He shall feed his flock

He shall feed His flock like a shepherd

A summary of the Saviour's deeds is given in a compilation of words from both Isaiah and Matthew. The Old Testament part "He shall feed His flock like a shepherd" (Isaiah 40:11), is sung by the alto in music in 12/8 time which is reminiscent of the Pifa, but moving first down, then up. The New Testament part, in the Gospel words of Jesus, are changed to the third person "Come unto Him, all ye that labour" (Matthew 11:28–29). The soprano sings the same melody, but elevated by a fourth from F major to B♭ major. Handel originally wrote the entire aria for soprano solo in B♭.

==== 21 ====
His yoke is easy

His yoke is easy

Matthew's gospel continues "My yoke is easy, and my burden is light", however for the closing choral movement of Part I, the words are changed to "His yoke is easy, His burden is light". Light and easy-going is the theme of a fugue, drawn from the duet for two sopranos "Quel fior che all’alba ride" (HWV 192, July 1741). "His yoke" is again set as an upward fourth, and "easy" is a playful coloratura. The texture is intensified to the end, when all proclaim as a solemn statement "and His burden is light".

== See also ==
- Messiah (Handel)
- Structure of Handel's Messiah
- Messiah Part II
- Messiah Part III
- Händel-Gesellschaft (volumes 45 and 45a)
- Letters and writings of George Frideric Handel
