= Messiah Part II =

Second part of Handel's English-language oratorio Messiah

Messiah
- (Part II)
- by George Frideric Handel
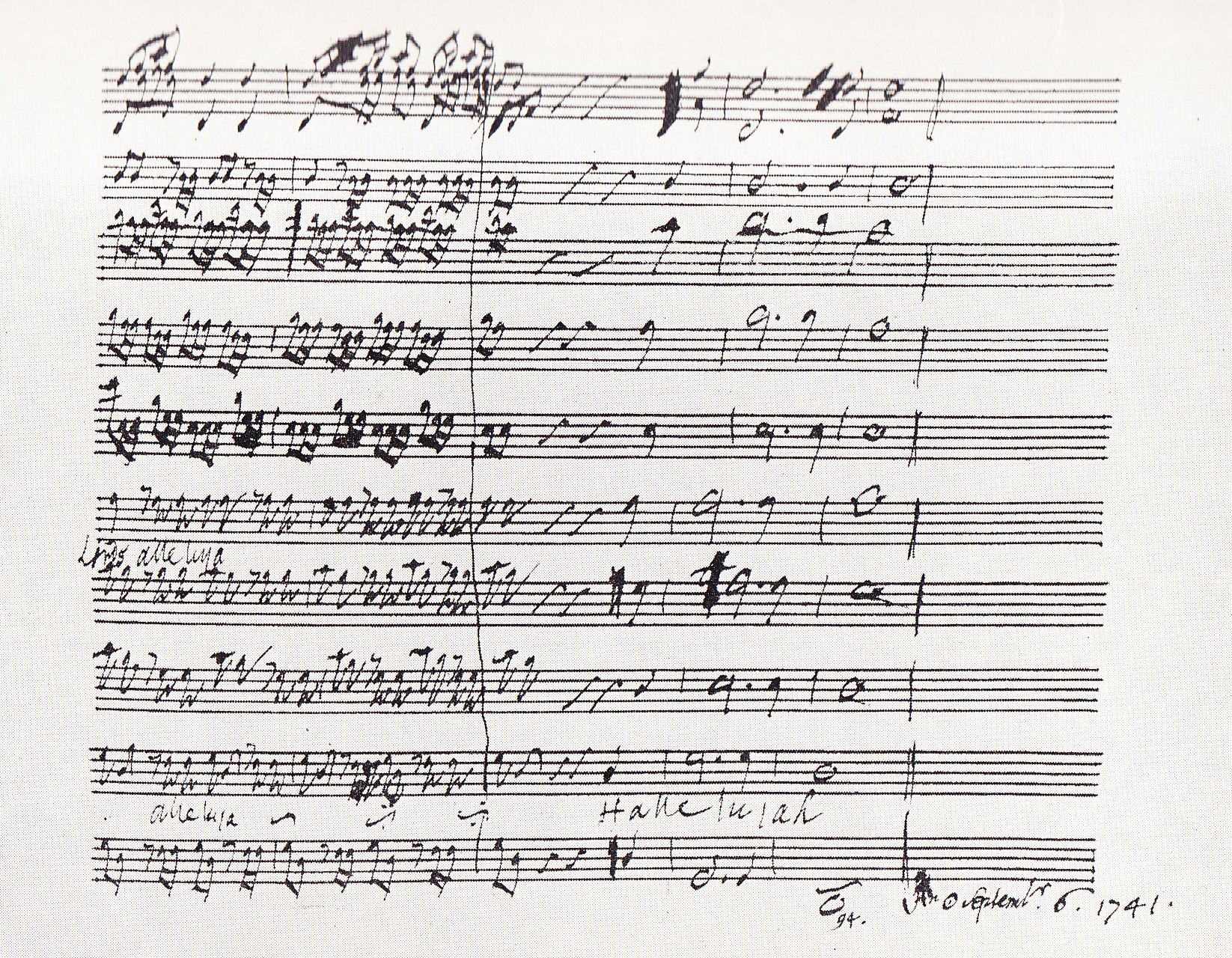
- The last page of the Hallelujah chorus, ending Part II, in Handel's manuscript
- Year: 1741
- Period: Baroque
- Genre: Oratorio
- Text: Charles Jennens, a compilation from the King James Bible and the Book of Common Prayer
- Composed: 22 August 1741 – 14 September 1741: London
- Movements: 23 in seven scenes
- Vocal: SATB choir and solo
- Instrumental: 2 trumpets; timpani; 2 oboes; 2 violins; viola; basso continuo

Messiah (HWV 56), the English-language oratorio composed by George Frideric Handel in 1741, is structured in three parts. This listing covers Part II in a table and comments on individual movements, reflecting the relation of the musical setting to the text. Part I begins with the prophecy of the Messiah and his birth, shows the annunciation to the shepherds and reflects the Messiah's deeds on earth. Part II covers the Passion in nine movements including the oratorio's longest movement, an air for alto He was despised, then mentions death, resurrection, ascension, and reflects the spreading of the Gospel and its rejection. The part is concluded by a scene called "God's Triumph" that culminates in the Hallelujah chorus. Part III of the oratorio concentrates on Paul's teaching of the resurrection of the dead and Christ's glorification in heaven.

== Messiah, the oratorio ==
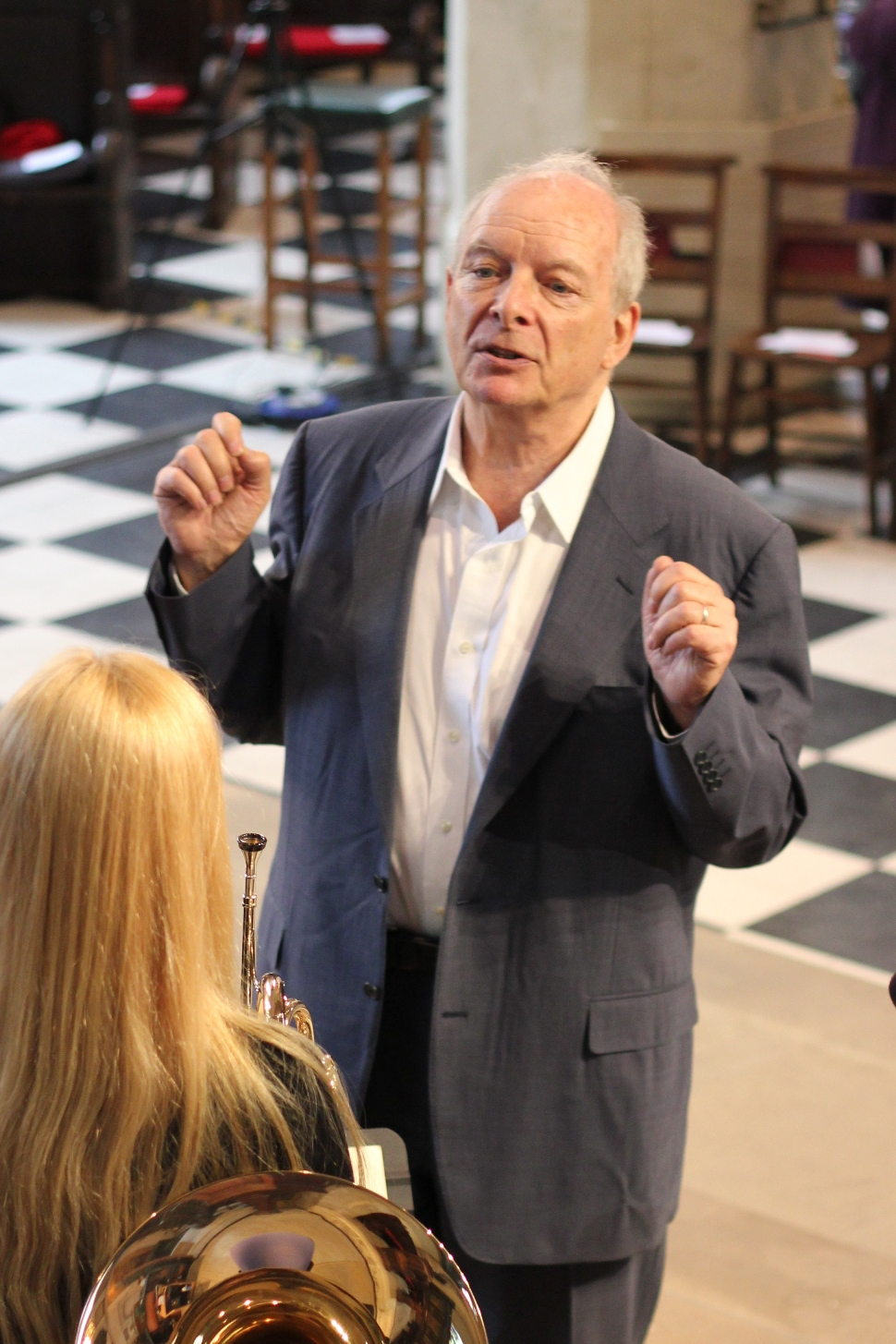
Christopher Hogwood in rehearsal in 2014

The libretto by Charles Jennens is entirely drawn from the Bible, mostly from the King James Bible, whereas several psalms are taken from the Book of Common Prayer. The librettist commented: "... the Subject excells every other Subject. The Subject is Messiah ...". Messiah differs from Handel's other oratorios by telling no story, instead offering reflections on different aspects of the Christian Messiah. Christopher Hogwood comments:

Messiah is not a typical Handel oratorio; there are no named characters, as are usually found in Handel's setting of the Old Testament stories, possibly to avoid charges of blasphemy. It is a meditation rather than a drama of personalities, lyrical in method; the narration of the story is carried on by implication, and there is no dialogue.

— Christopher Hogwood

=== Structure and concept ===
The oratorio's structure follows the liturgical year; Part I corresponding with Advent, Christmas and the life of Jesus, Part II with Lent, Easter, Ascension and Pentecost, Part III with the end of the church year, dealing with the end of time, the Resurrection of the dead and Christ's glorification in heaven. The sources are drawn mostly from the Old Testament. Even the birth and death of Jesus are told in the words of the prophet Isaiah, the most prominent source of the libretto. The only true scene of the oratorio is taken from the Gospel of Luke, the annunciation to the shepherds. The imagery of shepherd and lamb features prominently, in the aria "He shall feed His flock like a shepherd", the only extended piece to talk about the Messiah on earth, in the opening of Part II, "Behold the Lamb of God", in the chorus "All we like sheep", and in the closing chorus of the work, "Worthy is the Lamb". Occasionally verses from different biblical sources are combined in one movement, but more often a coherent text section is set in different consecutive movements, such as the first "scene", the annunciation of Christian salvation, as a sequence of three movements, recitative, aria and chorus.

=== Music ===
When Handel composed Messiah in London, he was already a successful and experienced composer of Italian operas. He had started in 1713 to also compose sacred music on English texts, such as the Utrecht Te Deum and Jubilate. He set many oratorios on English libretti. In Messiah he used practically the same musical means as for those works, namely a structure based on chorus and solo singing. Only a few movements are a duet or a combination of solo and chorus. The solos are typically a combination of recitative and aria. The arias are called Air or Song, some of them have da capo form, but rarely in a strict sense, repeating a first section after a sometimes contrasting middle section. Handel finds various ways to use the format freely, in order to convey the text. The movements marked "Recitative" (Rec.) are "secco", only accompanied by the basso continuo. Recitatives marked "Accompagnato" (Acc.) are accompanied by additional string instruments. Handel uses four voice parts in both solo and chorus, soprano (S), alto (A), tenor (T) and bass (B). Only once is the chorus divided in an upper chorus and a lower chorus, it is SATB otherwise. The orchestra scoring is simple: oboes, strings and basso continuo of harpsichord, violoncello, violone and bassoon. Two trumpets and timpani highlight selected movements, such as the closing movements of Part II, Hallelujah. Handel uses a cantus firmus on long repeated notes especially to illustrate God's speech and majesty, such as "King of Kings" in the Hallelujah chorus.

=== General notes ===
The following table is organized by movement numbers. There are two major systems of numbering the movements of Messiah: the historic Novello edition of 1959 (which is based on earlier editions and contains 53 movements), and the Bärenreiter edition of 1965 in the Hallische Händel-Ausgabe. Not counting some short recitatives as separate movements, there are therefore 47 movements. In the table below, the Novello number (Nov) is given first and is the index for the notes to individual movements in the "movements" section, then the Bärenreiter number (Bär).

To emphasise the movements in which the oboes and the rarely used trumpets play, the Scoring column lists instruments beyond the regular strings and basso continuo (harpsichord, violoncello, violone) that play throughout. Details on the development of keys, different tempo markings and times within a movement are given in notes on the individual movements. Typically a "scene" of recitative(s) and aria(s) is concluded with a choral movement.

== Part II summary ==
Movements of Messiah Part II
Nov	Bär	Title / First line	Form	Tempo marking	Scoring	Time	Key
22	19	Behold the Lamb of God	Chorus	Largo	2 oboes	common time	G minor
23	20	He was despised	Air, alto	Largo		common time	E♭ major
24	21	Surely, He hath borne our griefs	Chorus	Largo e staccato	2 oboes	common time	A♭ major
25	22	And with His stripes we are healed	Chorus	Alla breve, moderato	2 oboes	cut time	F minor
26	23	All we like sheep	Chorus	Allegro moderato	2 oboes	common time	F major
27	24	All they that see Him, laugh	Accompagnato, tenor	Larghetto		common time	B♭ minor
28	25	He trusted in God	Chorus	Allegro	2 oboes	common time	C minor
29	26	Thy rebuke hath broken His heart	Accompagnato, Tenor	Largo		common time	various
30	27	Behold, and see	Arioso, Tenor	Largo e piano		common time	E minor
31	28	He was cut off out	Accompagnato, tenor or soprano			common time	B minor
32	29	But Thou didst not leave his soul	Air, tenor or soprano	Andante larghetto		common time	A major
33	30	Lift up your heads	Chorus SSATB	A tempo ordinario	2 oboes	common time	F major
34		Unto which of the angels	Recitative, tenor			common time	D minor
35	31	Let all the angels of God	Chorus	Allegro	2 oboes	common time	D major
36	32	Thou art gone up on high	Air, alto, soprano, or bass	Allegro larghetto		3/4	D minor (alto and bass) / G minor (soprano)
37	33	The Lord gave the word	Chorus	Andante allegro	2 oboes	common time	B♭ major
38	34	How beautiful are the feet	Duet, alto or soprano & alto Chorus or Air, soprano or alto	Andante	2 oboes	common time	D minor (duet and chorus) / G minor (soprano) / C minor (alto)
39	35	Their sound is gone out	Arioso, tenor or chorus	Andante larghetto		common time	F major (tenor) / E♭ major (chorus)
40	36	Why do the nations so furiously rage	Air, bass	Allegro		common time	C major
41	37	Let us break their bonds asunder	Chorus	Allegro e staccato	2 oboes	3/4	C major
42		He that dwelleth in heaven	Recitative, Tenor			common time	A major
43	38	Thou shalt break them	Air, tenor	Andante		3/4	A minor
44	39	Hallelujah	Chorus	Allegro	2 oboes, 2 trumpets, timpani	common time	D major

== Part II movements ==
=== Scene 1 ===
Scene 1 is the longest scene of the oratorio and reflects the Passion, in Jennens' words "Christ's Passion; the scourging and the agony on the cross", in nine individual movements, including the longest one, the Air for alto "He was despised". Part II is the only part opened by a chorus, and continues to be dominated by choral singing. Block observes that the emphasis on the Passion differs from modern western popular Christianity, which prefers to stress the nativity of the Messiah.

==== 22 ====
Behold the Lamb of God

Behold the Lamb of God

The opening chorus "Behold the Lamb of God" begins like a French overture in G minor, a key of "tragic presentiment", according to Christopher Hogwood. The continuo drops an octave, then the violins rise an octave, to express "Behold". After only three instrumental measures the voices proclaim the Testimony of John the Baptist, John 1:29, which recalls Isaiah 53. The alto begins, followed after half a measure each by the soprano, the bass, and finally the tenor. After the initial rise, the melody falls in dotted rhythms, but rises on "that taketh away the sin of the world". The melody shows similarity to the beginning of "He shall feed his flock", but "sharpened" from major to minor, from triplets to dotted rhythm, and by the octave leap in the beginning.

==== 23 ====
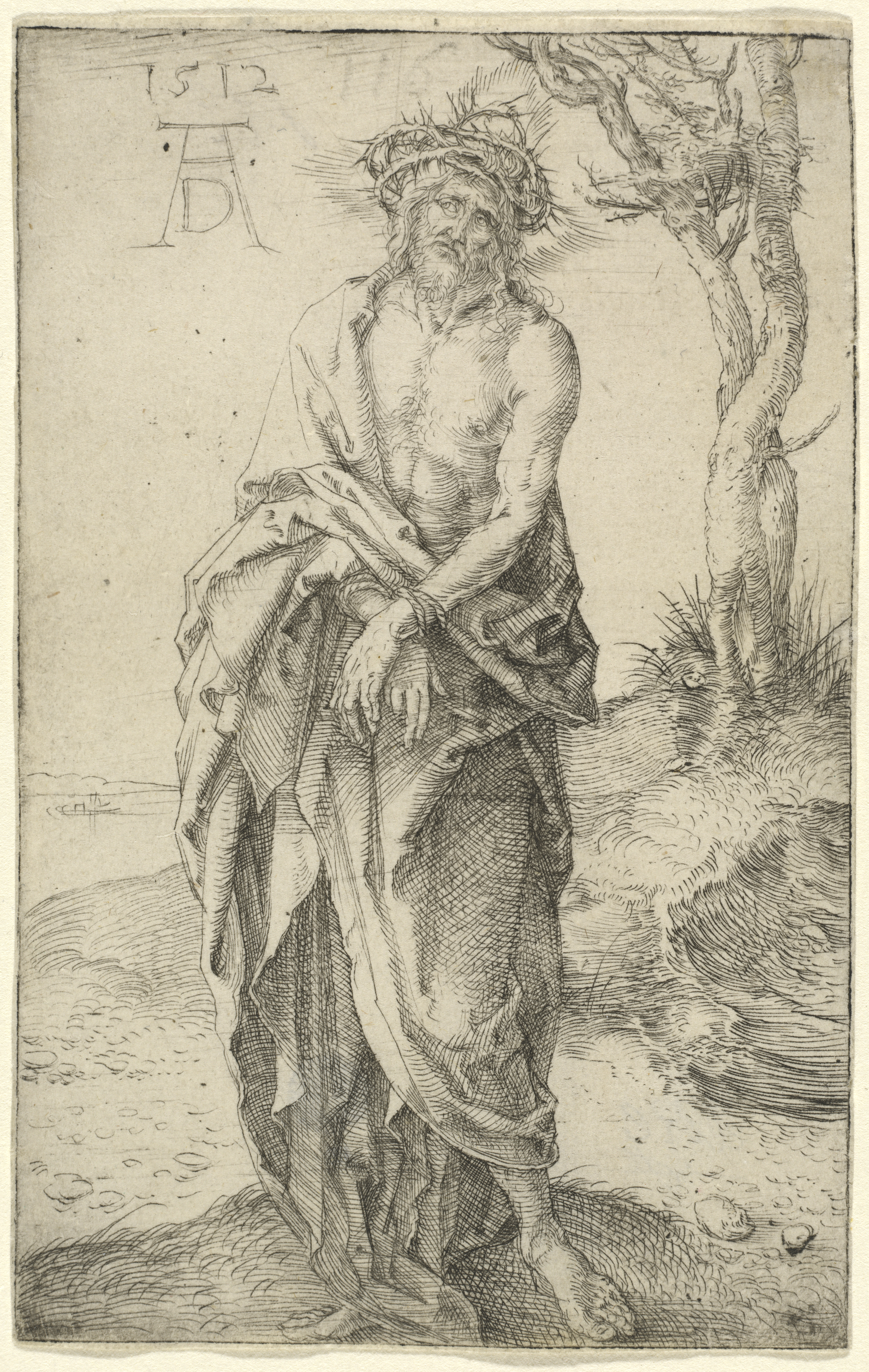
Schmerzensmann, Albrecht Dürer

He was despised

He was despised (8:47)

The text in this movement comes from Isaiah's fourth song about the Man of Sorrows: "He was despised, rejected of men, a man of sorrows, and acquainted with grief" (Isaiah 53:3), indicating that "the Messiah will play a substitutionary sacrificial role on behalf of his people". Handel gives the pitiful description to the alto solo in the longest movement of the oratorio in terms of duration. It is a da capo aria, showing two contrasting moods, set in E♭ major in the first section, C minor in the middle section. The vocal line begins with an ascending fourth on "he was" and adds another one on "despi-sed", ending as a sigh. The signal of a fourth has been observed by musicologist Rudolf Steglich as a unifying motif of the oratorio. Handel breaks the beginning of the text up to a stammering "He was despised, – despised and rejected, – rejected of men, ... – despi-sed – rejected", the words interspersed with rests as long as the words, as if exhausted. Soft sighing motifs of the violins, an echo of the singing, drop into these rests. Hogwood interprets the unaccompanied passages as emphasizing "Christ's abandonment". The middle section is also full of dramatic rests, but now the voice is set on a ceaseless agitated pattern of fast dotted notes in the instruments, illustrating the hits of the smiters in text from the third song (Isaiah 50:6), where the words appear in the first person: "He gave his back – to the smiters – ... and His cheeks – to them – that plucked off the hair. – He hid – not his face – from shame – and spitting."

==== 24 ====
Surely He hath borne our griefs

Surely, He hath borne our griefs

The dotted rhythm returns in instruments and voices in the chorus "Surely, He hath borne our griefs and carried our sorrows", the continuation of Isaiah's text, set in F minor. The chorus continues with the remainder of Isaiah 53:5 and ends on the words "the chastisement of our peace was upon him".

==== 25 ====
And with His stripes

And with His stripes we are healed

In the same key the chorus continues with a fugue "And with His stripes we are healed". The theme begins with a sequence of five long notes, which Mozart quoted in the Kyrie-fugue of his Requiem. The characteristic ascending fourth opens the countersubject. The word "healed" is later stressed by both long melismas and long notes.

==== 26 ====
All we, like sheep

All we like sheep

Still continuing Isaiah's text, "All we like sheep, have gone astray" is set as a fast chorus in F-major on a walking bass with irregular patterns and leaps. The voices utter twice together "All we like sheep", then two voice parts move simultaneously in different directions on "have gone astray", with the last syllable extended to eleven notes. The next bit of the text "we have turned" is illustrated by fast coloraturas, lacking direction. In a dramatic sudden adagio, full of chromatic tension, the movement ends on "and the Lord hath laid on Him the iniquity of us all". Myers comments about the chorus, which seems out of place at first sight: "In Handel's famous chorus sin glories in its shame with almost alcoholic exhilaration. His lost sheep meander hopelessly through a wealth of intricate semi quavers, stumbling over decorous roulades and falling into mazes of counterpoint that prove inextricable. A less dramatic composer than Handel would scarcely have rendered his solemn English text with such defiance, for the discrepancy between the self-accusing words and his vivacious music is patent to any listener emancipated from the lethargy of custom." The movement is based on the final section of the duet for two sopranos "Nò, di voi non vo' fidarmi" (translation: No, I don’t want to trust you) (HWV 189, July 1741).

==== 27 ====
All they that see Him laugh

All they that see Him, laugh Him to scorn

The thought "All they that see Him, laugh Him to scorn" is taken from Psalm 22 (Psalms 22:7), the psalm from which Jesus quoted on the cross, according to Mark and Matthew. The text is set as a short tenor accompagnato, again based on a pattern of dotted notes in the instruments. The strings through in violent figures after "laugh Him to scorn" and "shoot out their lips", similar to an outburst of laughter. The key of B♭ minor is termed "remote and barbarous" by Hogwood.

==== 28 ====
He trusted in God

He trusted in God, that He would deliver Him

What they say is given to the chorus as a strict fugue in C minor: "He trusted in God, that He would deliver Him, if He delight in Him" (from Matthew 27:43). Jonathan Keates observes that Handel depicts the mocking, menacing crowd here, comparable to the turbae in Bach's Passions.

==== 29 ====
Thy rebuke hath broken His heart

Thy rebuke hath broken His heart

The tenor returns to sing a verse of the Psalm 69: "Thy rebuke hath broken His heart" (Psalms 69:20). Aching chromatic chords picture the broken heart. The accompagnato begins in A♭ major, shifts without stability and ends in B major. The tenor voice, going to report death and resurrection in scene 2, is comparable to the Evangelist in the Passions of Bach.

==== 30 ====
Behold and see

Behold, and see if there be any sorrow

The tenor arioso "Behold, and see if there be any sorrow" (Lamentations 1:12) is based on text from the Book of Lamentations which is frequently associated with Good Friday, both Jesus and his mother Mary, although it originally lamented the destruction of Jerusalem. In the short movement in E minor, the accompaniment pauses rather regularly on the first and third beat of a measure.

=== Scene 2 ===
Scene 2 covers death and resurrection in two tenor solo movements.

==== 31 ====
He was cut off

He was cut off out of the land of the living

In a restrained way, the death of the Messiah is told in another tenor accompagnato, as foretold by Isaiah, "He was cut off out of the land of the living" (Isaiah 53:8). Long chords begin in B minor and end in E major.

==== 32 ====
But Thou didst not leave (1:32)

But Thou didst not leave his soul in hell

His resurrection is again told by the tenor in an Air according to Psalm 16, "But Thou didst not leave his soul in hell" (Psalms 16:10).

=== Scene 3 ===
Scene 3 refers in a chorus to the ascension.

==== 33 ====
Lift up ye heads, O ye gates

Lift up your heads

"Lift up your heads" is a line from Psalm 24 (Psalms 24:7–10). Since the text has questions ("Who is the King of Glory?") and answers ("He is the King of Glory"), Handel divides the choir in the first section to a high, announcing group (sopranos I and II, alto) and a low, questioning group (alto, tenor, bass).

=== Scene 4 ===
Scene 4 covers the Messiah's position in heaven, following the teaching from the Epistle to the Hebrews in two verses, Hebrews 1:5–6.

==== 34 ====
Unto which of the angels

Unto which of the angels said he at any time

In a short recitative the tenor renders the first verse, quoting Hebrews (Hebrews 1:5), "Unto which of the angels said he at any time", about the Messiah as the begotten Son of God.

==== 35 ====
Let all the angels of God worship Him

Let all the angels of God worship Him

The second verse "Let all the angels of God worship Him" (Hebrews 1:6) is a festive chorus in D major.

=== Scene 5 ===
Scene 5 alludes to Pentecost and the beginning of preaching the Gospel.

==== 36 ====
Thou art gone up on high

Thou art gone up on high

Pentecost is referred to rather indirectly, without naming the Holy Spirit. "Thou art gone up on high" from Psalm 68 (Psalms 68:18) reflects "gifts for men" and "that God might dwell among them", expressed in swinging 3/4 time. Originally written for bass, Handel rewrote the Air in London in 1750 for the castrato Gaetano Guadagni. However, the earlier editions (Novello, Best and Prout) all give this air to the Bass, in D minor; the current Novello edition by Watkins Shaw, as well as the Bäreneiter edition by John Tobin and the CF Peters edition by Donald Burrows all give the air to Alto (in D minor), and they provide transpositions for Soprano and Bass as well.

==== 37 ====
The Lord gave the word

The Lord gave the word

The thoughts are continued in an earlier verse from the same psalm (Psalms 68:11) as a chorus in B♭ major. "The Lord gave the word" is sung by just two voice parts, "Great was the company of the preachers" expanded for four parts with long coloraturas on "company".

==== 38 ====
How beautiful are the feet

How beautiful are the feet of Him

The preachers are described tenderly in a duet in D minor and 3/4 time, as written first by Isaiah (Isaiah 52:7) and quoted by Paul in his Epistle to the Romans (Romans 10:15: "How beautiful are the feet of Him". Two alto voices begin and are joined by the choir, stressing "good tidings", "break forth into joy" and culminating on a cantus firmus of one repeated note: "Thy God reigneth!" Block, quoting Genesis 18:2, reflects that you see the feet of a messenger if you "fall prostrate before a superior. In the Bible, when people are confronted by a heavenly messenger (angel) the natural response is to fall down on one's face before the messenger." Handel's original version, a duet in D minor for two altos and chorus or soprano, alto and chorus, was later rewritten by him in 1749 as an aria for soprano in G minor and 12/8 time and in 1750 transposed for alto in C minor.

==== 39 ====
Their sound is gone out

Their sound is gone out into all lands

Based on a number of Bible references, a tenor arioso describes the preachers further: "Their sound is gone out into all lands" (Romans 10:18, Psalms 19:4). In another Handel's version (so called version B), which is commonly preferred by performers now, the same text is set to new music and scored for chorus.

=== Scene 6 ===
Scene 6 shows the difficulties and rejection of the preaching, based on four consecutive verses from Psalm 2, Psalms 2:1–4. It is the first text in the oratorio actually referring to the Messiah, the "anointed one" (verse 2).

==== 40 ====
Why do the nations

Why do the nations so furiously rage together

An Air for bass in C major, accompanied by an orchestra in continuous motion, tells of the difficulties. "Why do the nations so furiously rage together". Several terms, such as "Rage", are expressed by long melismas in triplets. Handel originally wrote a long 96-bar version of this air, skipping the da capo repeat. In an alternate version, he removed the last 58 bars and replaced them with a recitative setting of the second verse of the scripture.

==== 41 ====
Let us break their bonds asunder

Let us break their bonds asunder

The choir continues the thought; the intention "Let us break their bonds asunder" is expressed in a fast succession of entries of the voices.

==== 42 ====
He that dwelleth in heaven

He that dwelleth in heaven

The text continues in a short tenor recitative: "He that dwelleth in heaven".

=== Scene 7 ===
Scene 7 is called "God's triumph" by Jennens.

==== 43 ====
Thou shalt break them

Thou shalt break them with a rod of iron

A forceful Air for tenor tells of God's power against enemies, again taken from Psalm 2: "Thou shalt break them with a rod of iron" (Psalms 2:9).

==== 44 ====
Hallelujah
1953: Hermann Scherchen directing the London Symphony Orchestra and London Philharmonic Choir; Margaret Ritchie, soprano; Constance Schacklock, contralto; William Herbert, tenor; Richard Standen, bass; Frederick Jackson, chorus master; Thomas Matthews, violin; George Eskdale, trumpet.

Hallelujah

Part II closes with the Hallelujah chorus which became famous as a stand-alone piece, set in the key of D major with trumpets and timpani. The choir introduces Hallelujah, repeated in homophony, in a characteristic simple motif for the word, playing with the interval of a second, which re-appears throughout the piece. Several lines from the Book of Revelation (Revelation 19:6,16, Revelation 11:15) are treated differently, as in a motet, but unified by "Hallelujah" as a conclusion or as a countersubject in a fugal section. The line "for the Lord God omnipotent reigneth" is sung by all voices, first in unison, then in imitation with Hallelujah-exclamations interspersed. (The melody is based on the fugue theme from Corelli's "Fuga a Quattro Voci".) The second line "The kingdom of this world is become" is sung in a four-part setting like a chorale. The third idea "and He shall reign for ever and ever" starts as a fugue on a theme with bold leaps, reminiscent in sequence of Philipp Nicolai's Lutheran chorale "Wachet auf". As a countersubject, the words "for ever – and ever" assume the rhythm of the Hallelujah-motif. The final acclamation "King of Kings...and Lord of Lords" is sung on one note, energized by repeated calls Hallelujah and "for ever – and ever", raised higher and higher in the sopranos and trumpets, up to a rest full of tension and a final solemn Hallelujah.
