= Hallelujah Chorus =

No. 39 from George Frideric Handel's Messiah

Hallelujah
- Closing chorus of Part II of Messiah by George Frideric Handel
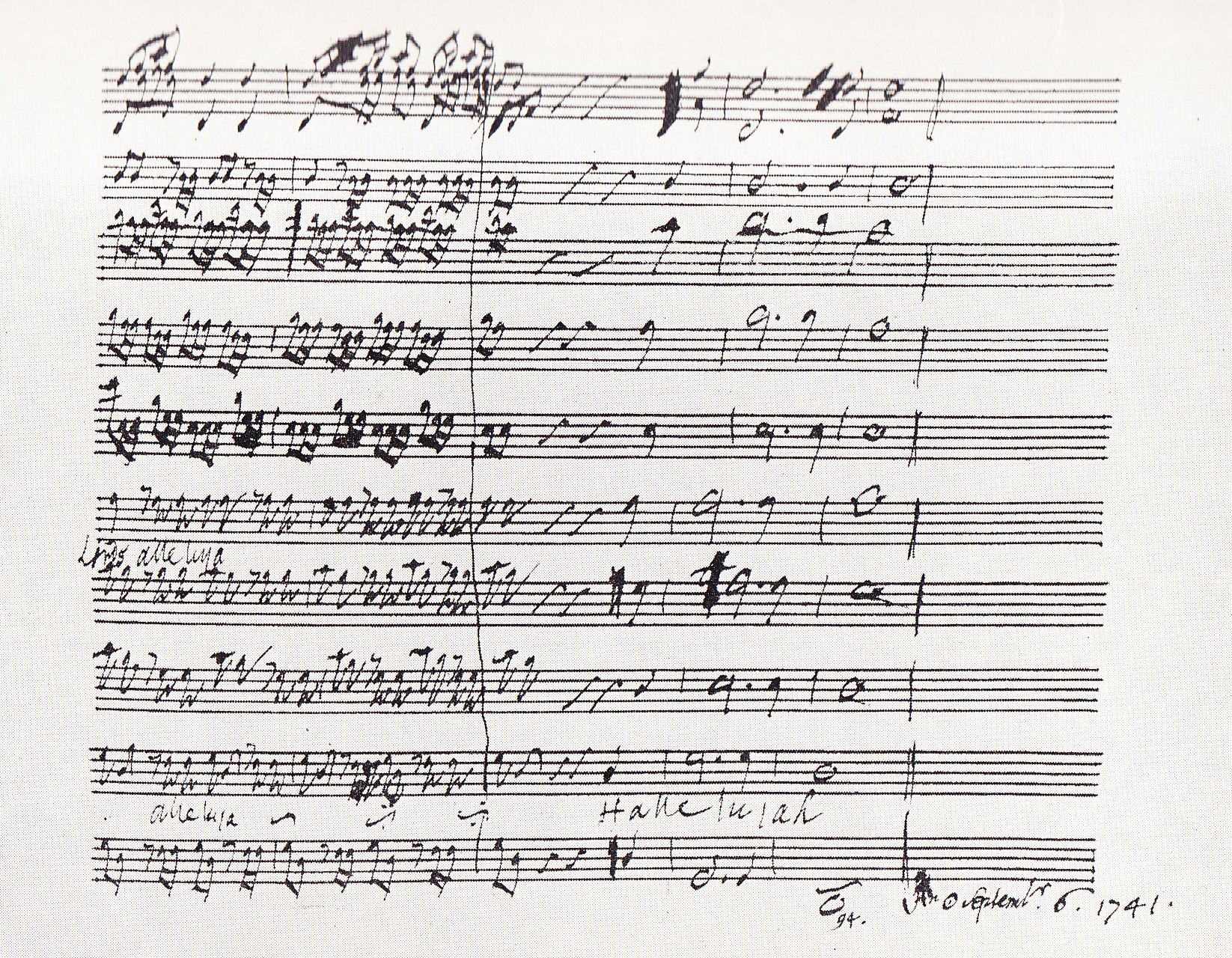
- The last page in Handel's manuscript
- Key: D major
- Year: 1741
- Text: biblical
- Vocal: SATB choir
- Instrumental: 2 trumpets; timpani; 2 oboes; strings; continuo

Hallelujah (3:47)
Performed by MIT Concert Choir, directed by William C. Cutter

The Hallelujah Chorus is the final movement of the Messiah Part II by George Friedrich Handel. It was written in 1741 and received its debut performance in 1742 during Lent in Dublin, Ireland. It has been called one of the most famous pieces of Baroque choral music and the most well-known piece in Messiah.

== Composition ==
The "Hallelujah Chorus" is set in the key of D major with trumpets and timpani. The choir introduces in homophony a characteristic simple motif on the word, playing with the interval of a second, which re-appears throughout the piece. Several lines from the Book of Revelation (Revelation 19:6,16, Revelation 11:15) are treated differently, as in a motet, but unified by "Hallelujah" as a conclusion or as a countersubject in a fugal section. The line "for the Lord God omnipotent reigneth" is sung by all voices, first in unison, then in imitation with Hallelujah-exclamations interspersed. The second line "The kingdom of this world is become" is sung in a four-part setting like a chorale. The third idea "and he shall reign for ever and ever" starts as a fugue on a theme with bold leaps, reminiscent in sequence of Philipp Nicolai's Lutheran chorale Wachet auf. As a countersubject, the words "for ever – and ever" assume the rhythm of the Hallelujah-motif. The final acclamation "King of Kings...and Lord of Lords" is sung on one note, energized by repeated calls "Hallelujah" and "for ever – and ever", raised higher and higher (the sopranos and the trumpets part), up to a rest full of tension and a final solemn "Hallelujah".

During the time Handel wrote Messiah, he barely ate anything despite his servants bringing him food as normal each day. One day, one of his servants entered Handel's room to find the composer in tears. When asked what was wrong, Handel held up the score to the Hallelujah Chorus and said, "I did think I did see all Heaven before me, and the great God Himself". The Hallelujah Chorus along with the rest of Messiah was first performed in Dublin, Ireland in 1742. Handel had a similar experience a year later at the London premiere where after the "Hallelujah Chorus" was performed, one of his assistants found him again in tears. Again in response to being questioned, he held up a copy of the score and said, "I thought I saw the face of God".

The "Hallelujah Chorus" is predominately performed at Easter and Christmas. It is performed at Christmas because of an erroneous belief it is about the Nativity of Jesus when it was intended to celebrate the Resurrection of Jesus and the Ascension of Jesus.

== Tradition ==
Traditionally, whenever the Hallelujah Chorus is performed, the audience will stand. This tradition is ascribed to the debut performance in London with King George II of Great Britain in attendance. It is reported that at the start of the Chorus, the King was so impressed that he stood up and remained standing until the end. As a result, everyone else stood as Royal protocol dictated that when the King stood, everyone else stood until the King did otherwise. Another explanation as to why the tradition of standing for the "Hallelujah Chorus" came about was because of the mix of secular and sacred music in Messiah, the "Hallelujah Chorus" was the part of Messiah that caused people to stand as if were a hymn as hymns are often sung while standing. Often conductors who support the tradition will turn prior to the performance of the "Hallelujah Chorus" and cue the audience to stand while conductors who oppose it sometimes request patrons remain seated.

== Outside Messiah ==
The "Hallelujah Chorus" has been used outside of Messiah performances. In 2009, the BBC and the English National Opera created a project titled "Sing Hallelujah!" whereby 450 choirs throughout the United Kingdom would come together to perform the "Hallelujah Chorus". In 2016, the American Mormon Tabernacle Choir did a similar project however they received recordings from worldwide to perform the "Hallelujah Chorus". The tune has been adopted by British association football fans for football chants. In 2006, Newcastle United fans used the "Hallelujah Chorus" as a tribute to their former captain Alan Shearer. The American professional wrestler Damien Sandow used the "Hallelujah Chorus" as his entrance music while wrestling for WWE, as well as when wrestling as Aron Rex in Total Nonstop Action.
