= Watkins Shaw =

British musicologist (1911–1996)

Harold Watkins Shaw, OBE (3 April 1911 in Bradford, Yorkshire – 8 October 1996 in Worcester) was a British musicologist and educator best known for his critical edition of Handel's Messiah compiled between 1957 and 1965, which version has largely supplanted that of Ebenezer Prout in British amateur performance - The Times obituarist described it as being in "universal use".

Shaw was the only child of schoolteachers in Bradford. He attended Grange Road School, where his father taught geography, and he discovered his love of music from singing in chapel choirs. In 1929 he won the George Calder MacLeod Scholarship to read history at Wadham College, Oxford, graduating in 1932 and winning the Osgood Memorial prize for his dissertation on John Blow, after which he studied at the Royal College of Music for a year. It was here that he was encouraged to combine his loves of history and music.

He held a teaching post in London and was music organizer to Hertfordshire County Council for three years from 1946 and a lecturer at Worcester College of Education from 1949 until retirement in 1970. These positions, while "less than satisfying to his scholarly temperament" at least allowed him sufficient time to pursue his independent work as a musical writer and editor, a work in which he was proud to have supported himself without recourse to grants or bursaries.

From 1971 to 1980, Shaw was the Keeper of the Parry Room Library at the Royal College of Music.

In 1948, E. H. Fellowes retired as honorary librarian of Sir Frederick Ouseley’s choral foundation of St Michael's College, Tenbury. Shaw was his successor and also served as a Governor and Fellow. When the college closed in 1985 Shaw negotiated through Ouseley’s two conflicting wills to ensure that all the manuscripts in this important collection reached the Bodleian Library - including Handel’s conducting score of Messiah, used by the composer for the first performance in Dublin in 1742 - and also influenced the Charity Commissioners to ensure that the endowment now known as the Ouseley Trust should be made available "for the purpose of promoting and maintaining to a high standard the choral services of the Church of England".

Shaw was particularly known for his extensive writings on and editing of church music, a field in which he was active for nearly 50 years. Much of his work was published under the auspices of the Church Music Society, of which he was the first honorary general editor (for 14 years from 1956), chairman from 1979 to 1987. He was also closely associated with the Three Choirs Festival, often writing its programmes, and publishing its history in 1954.

His interests and publications focused on what is now termed early music, in Shaw's case roughly from Thomas Tallis to Samuel Sebastian Wesley, with major interests being John Blow, Henry Purcell and George Frideric Handel. He also reconstructed and reinstated preces and responses by William Byrd, Thomas Morley, William Smith and Thomas Tomkins. His scholarship in these centuries coincided with and helped lay the foundations on which the early music revival of the late 20th Century was built.

Honours included a DLitt awarded in 1967 by the faculty of music at Oxford University and the OBE awarded in 1990 for services to music.

Published works included:

- Music in the Primary School (London, 1952)
- The Three Choirs Festival c1713–1953 (Worcester and London, 1954)
- Music in the Secondary School (London, 1961)
- The Story of Handel's 'Messiah', 1741–1784 (London, 1963)
- A Textual and Historical Companion to Handel's 'Messiah' (London, 1965)
- A Study of the Bing-Gostling Part Books in the Library of York Minster together with a Systematic Catalogue (Croydon, 1986)
- The Succession of Organists of the Chapel Royal and the Cathedrals of England and Wales from c. 1538 (Oxford, 1991).
