= Charles Jennens =

English landowner and art patron (1700–1773)

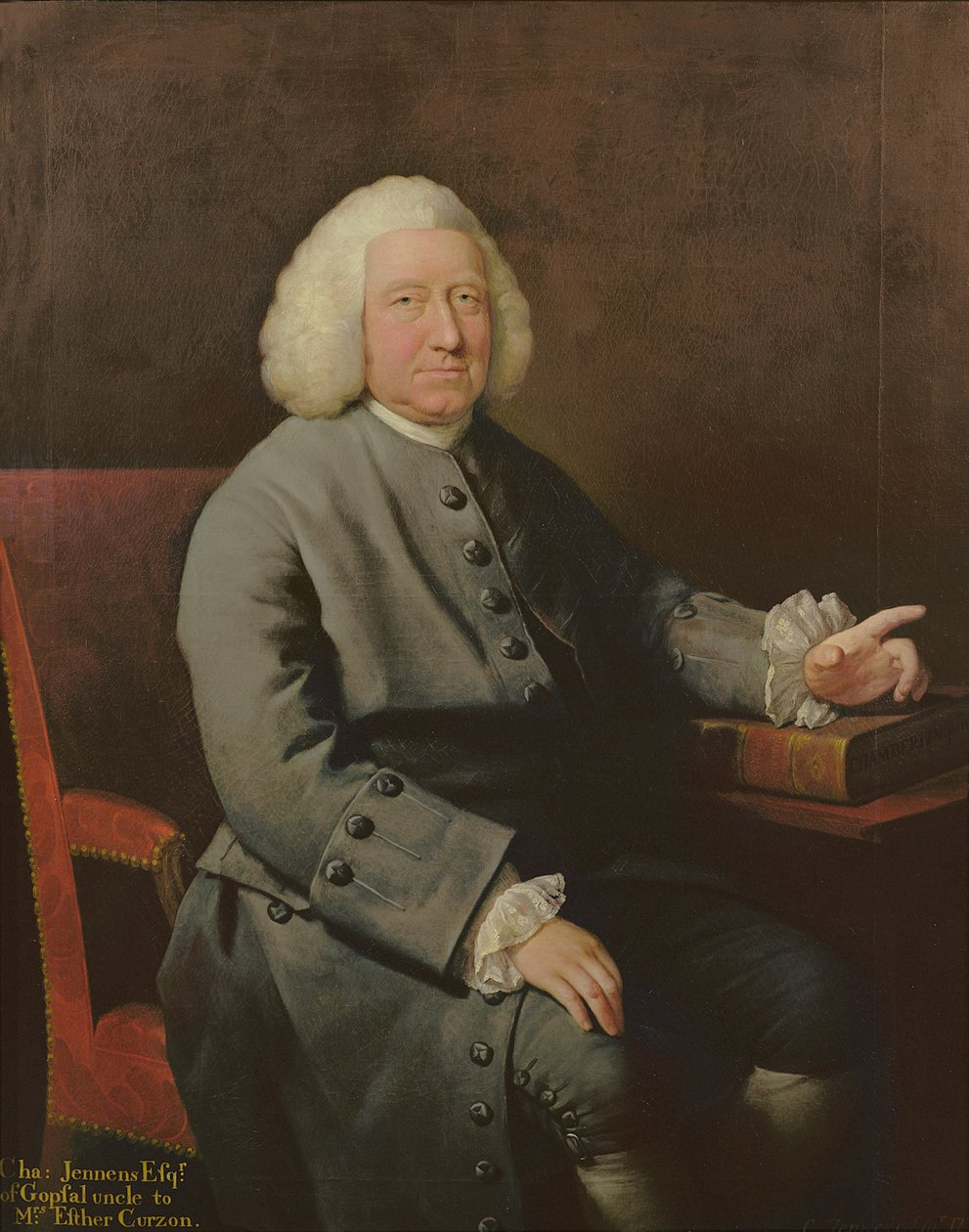
Portrait by Mason Chamberlin

Charles Jennens (1700 – 20 November 1773) was an English landowner and art patron. As a friend of Handel, he helped author the libretti of several of his oratorios, most notably Messiah.

== Life ==
Jennens was brought up at Gopsall Hall in Leicestershire, the son of Charles Jennens and his second wife, Elizabeth Burdett. He was educated at Balliol College, Oxford, matriculating in 1716, but did not graduate. He was a devout Christian and a non-juror, upholding the legitimacy of the deposed Stuart line. He became interested in Primitive Apostolic (Sabbatarian) Christianity and John Chrysostom. Jennens has been identified as an anti-Deist. Richard Kidder's book A Demonstration of the Messias influenced him.

After his father's death in 1747, Jennens had Gopsall Hall completely rebuilt in the Palladian style, including within the estate an Ionic temple built in memory of his friend, the poet and classical scholar, Edward Holdsworth. Remaining unmarried, he was considered melancholic and extravagant, his neighbours calling him Solyman the Magnificent. As a non-juror, Jennens was ineligible for any public appointment, and he devoted himself to the arts, both as a collector of fine art (his collection was one of the best in Britain at the time) and a music patron. George Frideric Handel's compositions were very much to his musical taste and they became close friends. Handel visited him frequently at Gopsall Hall and in 1749 provided the specification for an organ for his home. Thomas Hudson's portrait of Handel was commissioned by Jennens – and the same artist's portrait of Charles Jennens is now in the Handel House Museum in London.

He died on 20 November 1773. His memorial lies in Nether Whitacre Parish Church and was sculpted by Richard Hayward who also provided sculptures both in his London home at Great Ormond Street and at his country seat of Gopsall Park.

After his death, Jennens' second cousin Heneage Finch, 3rd Earl of Aylesford, inherited his music library and much of it is now preserved in the Henry Watson Music Library at Manchester Central Library. It contains a large collection of manuscripts and published music by Handel and other contemporary composers, both English and Italian; there are 368 volumes of Handel manuscripts, and others include the autograph of Antonio Vivaldi's "Manchester" violin sonatas and an early manuscript of The Four Seasons. Jennens' extensive collection of books by William Shakespeare, on literature, philology and theology was largely dispersed in a sale in 1918.

== Collaboration with Handel ==
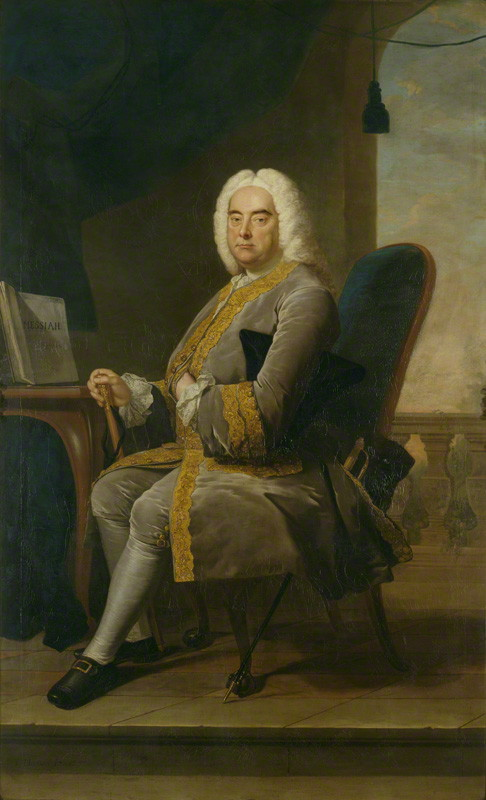
Portrait of George Frideric Handel by Thomas Hudson, 1756. Jennens commissioned the painting of his collaborator Handel.

Jennens' deep knowledge of the Bible and wide literary interest led him, from 1735, to prepare or contribute to libretti for Handel. These included Saul (1735–39), L'Allegro, il Penseroso ed il Moderato (1740–41), Messiah (1741–42), Belshazzar (1744–45) and, possibly, Israel in Egypt (1738–39). The libretti were freely given and always published anonymously. Saul and Belshazzar are said to "show an impressive gift for dramatic structure and characterization and the ability to wield political analogies adroitly."

Well versed in music as well as literature, he annotated his copies of Handel's operas, adding corrections, bass figures, rejected pieces and dates. It is also clear that on occasions Handel was prepared to accept Jennens' suggestions and improvements to his compositions.

The most famous collaboration is Jennens' libretto for Messiah, drawn entirely from the Bible, about 60 per cent from the Old Testament (with occasional small alterations). Musicologist Watkins Shaw describes it as "a meditation of our Lord as Messiah in Christian thought and belief", and which "amounts to little short of a work of genius". Some attribute Messiah's emphasis on the Old Testament – and choice of the Old Testament title "Messiah" – to Jennens' theological beliefs. Jennens was less than wholly approving of the musical setting, writing to Edward Holdsworth:

"I shall show you a collection I gave Handel, called Messiah, which I value highly. He has made a fine entertainment of it, though not near so good as he might and ought to have done. I have with great difficulty made him correct some of the grossest faults in the composition; but he retained his overture obstinately, in which there are some passages far unworthy of Handel, but much more unworthy of the Messiah."

== Editor of Shakespeare ==
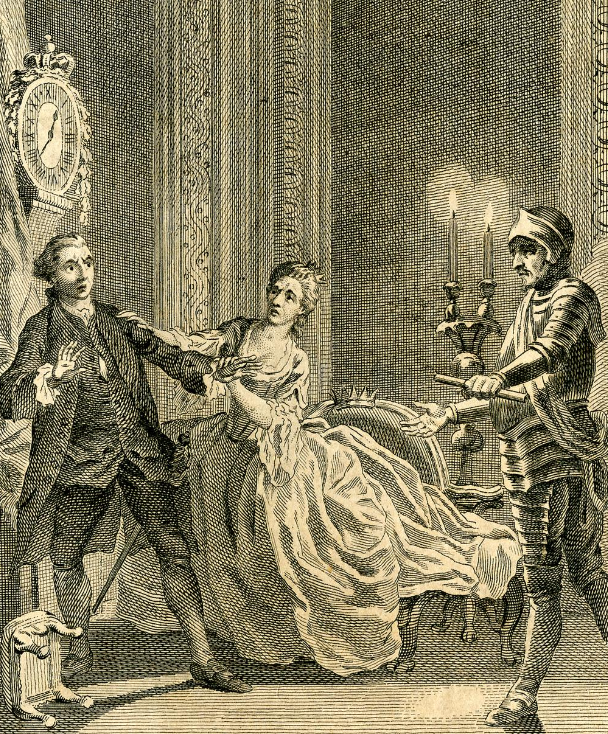
Frontispiece to his 1773 version of Hamlet - Spranger Barry (or Garrick) with Mary Elmy in the closing scene

In the early 1770s, Jennens commenced the preparation of scrupulous critical editions of Shakespeare plays, and the first time that these had been published individually and with editorial footnotes. He completed King Lear, Hamlet, Othello, Macbeth, and Julius Caesar before his death in 1773. These editions drew scorn, perhaps due to envy, from the Shakespeare editor George Steevens who severely attacked not only Jennens' work, but particularly his character: "The chief error of Mr. Jennens's life consisted in his perpetual association with a set of men every way inferior to himself. By these means he lost all opportunities of improvement, but gained what he preferred to the highest gratifications of wisdom – flattery in excess."

== Family ==
Jennens was the grandson of Birmingham ironmaster Sir Humphrey Jennens, of Eddington Hall, Warwickshire. Charles Jennens' first cousin, William Jennens was described as the "richest commoner in England" when he died unmarried and intestate with a fortune estimated at £2 million (worth in excess of £230 million at 2015 rates). Charles Jennens' own fortune was inherited by his sister Elizabeth Jennens Hanmer (1692–1777). Elizabeth's daughter Esther Hanmer (1719–1764) married Assheton Curzon, 1st Viscount Curzon.

== See also ==
- Letters and writings of George Frideric Handel
