= Mercer's Hospital =

Former hospital in Dublin, Ireland

- Health Service Executive
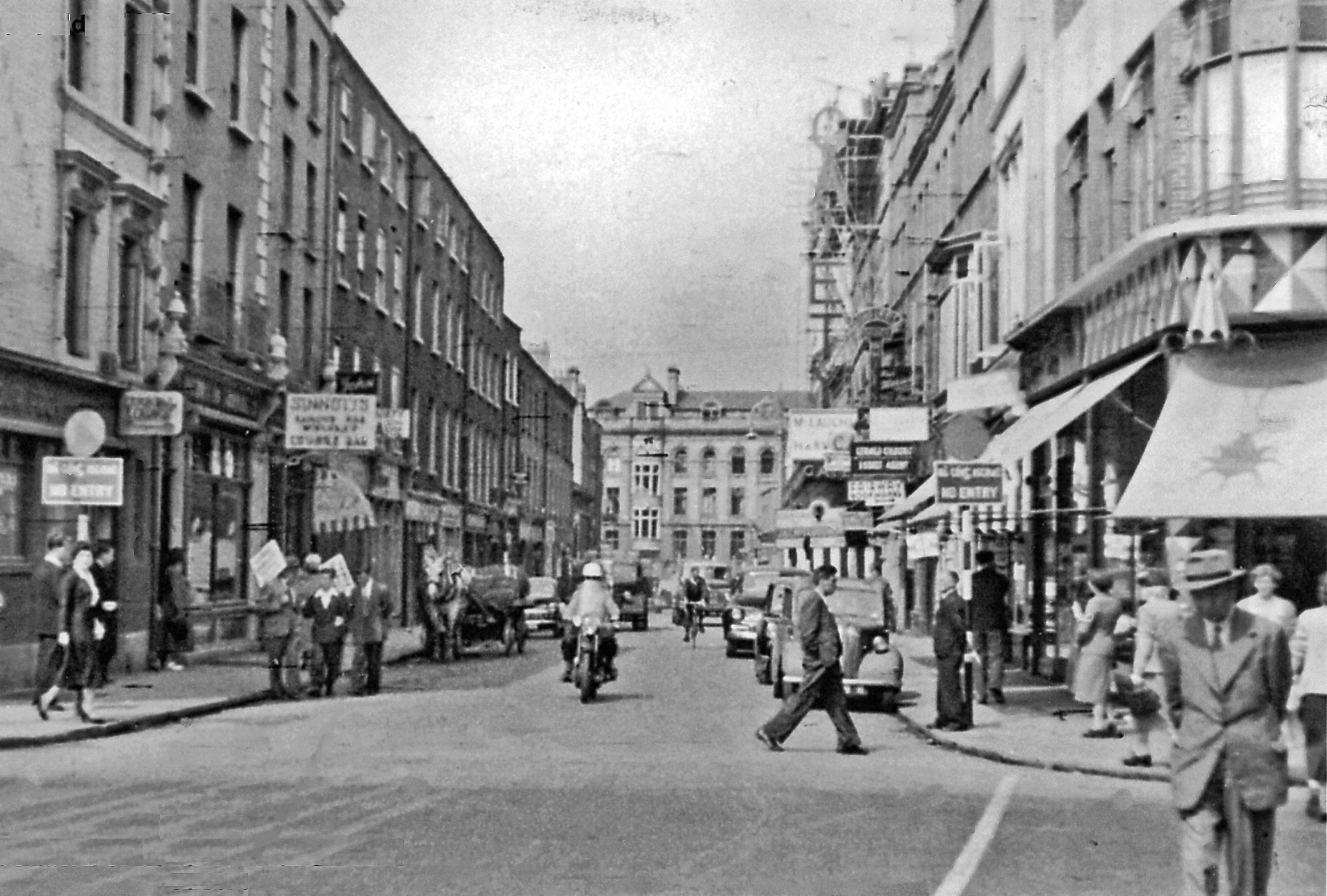
- Mercer's Hospital (at the end of the Street)

- Shown in Dublin

Geography
- Location: Dublin, Ireland
- Coordinates: 53.340704°N 6.263541°W

Organisation
- Care system: HSE
- Type: General Hospital

History
- Founded: 1734
- Closed: 1983

Mercer's Hospital (Irish: Ospidéal Mercer) was a hospital in Dublin, Ireland. It was converted into a clinical centre and medical library for the Royal College of Surgeons in Ireland in 1991.

== History ==
=== Medieval leper house ===
The hospital has its origins in a leper house and church named St. Stephen's which was established on the site pre-1230 AD and which had come under the jurisdiction of an unnamed religious brotherhood by the late 14th century. Both St Stephen's Green and Stephen Street were named after the site. The charitable offerings of the citizens of Dublin to the institution diminished during the Elizabethan era and an entry in the Assembly Rolls of the Corporation of 1590-91 describes how "the poor lazares (lepers) of St. Stephen's complaineth that they are in distress and wante".

By 1665 the old hospital, chapel and graveyard of St. Stephen's lay derelict and the site was walled in. In the following years the parishes of St. Stephen united with that of St Michael Le Pole and St. Bride's and in 1682 a new dedicated church was constructed on Bride Street.

An effort was made between 1697 and 1698 to revive the hospital in some form, and permission was granted by the Churchwardens to "build a house containing four rooms for poor decayed Christians" on the ground "adjoining the gate of St. Stephen's Churchyard which is now walled in and made parte of the said churchyard, but on which ground, or thereabouts, there was formerly a poore house built."

The house for "poor decayed Christians" was never built and the site lay vacant until February 1724 when Mary Mercer began leasing part of St Stephen's churchyard for the purposes of establishing a charity house thereon.

=== 1724 building ===
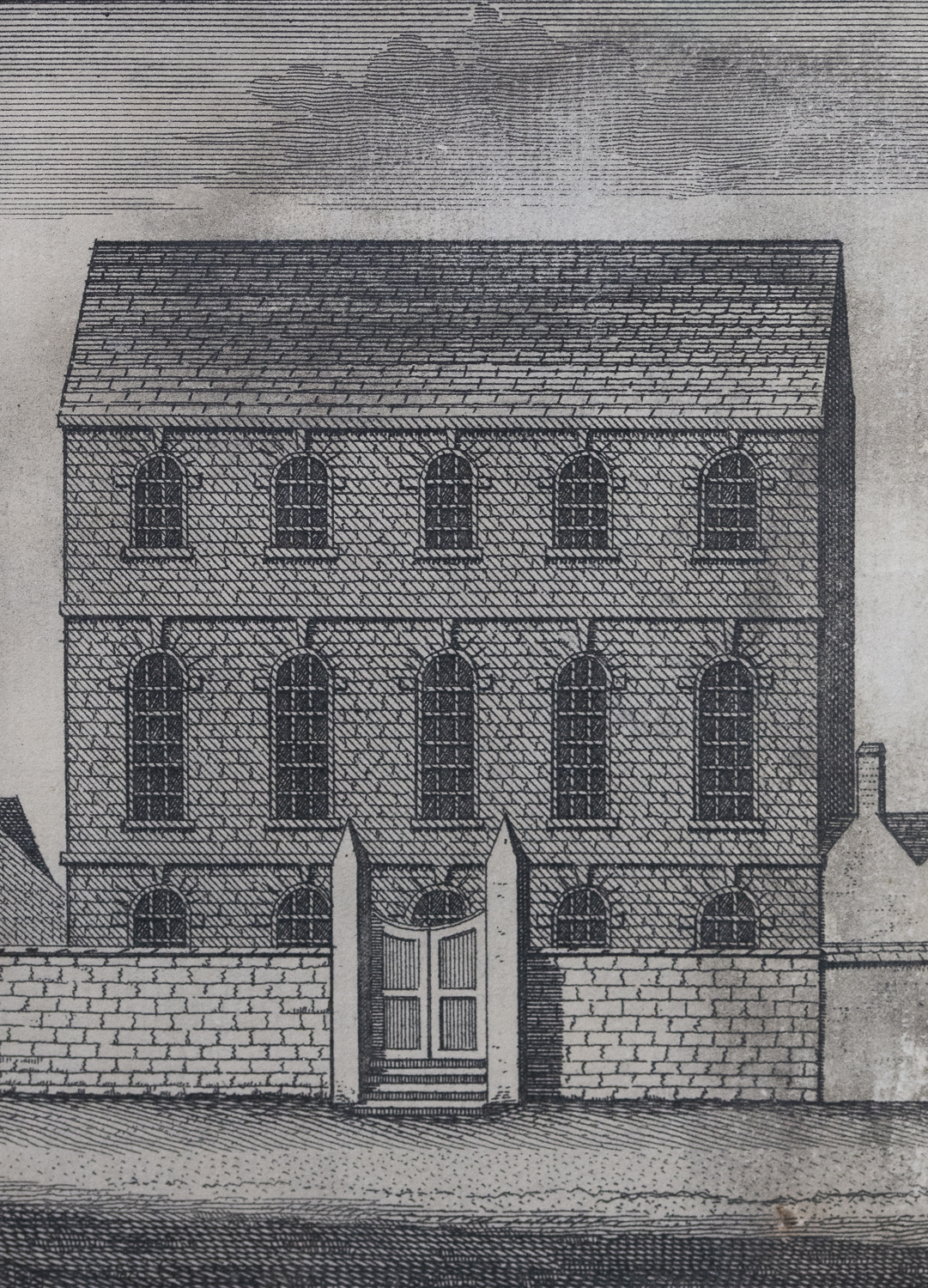
An illustration of the hospital taken from Charles Brooking's map of Dublin (1728).

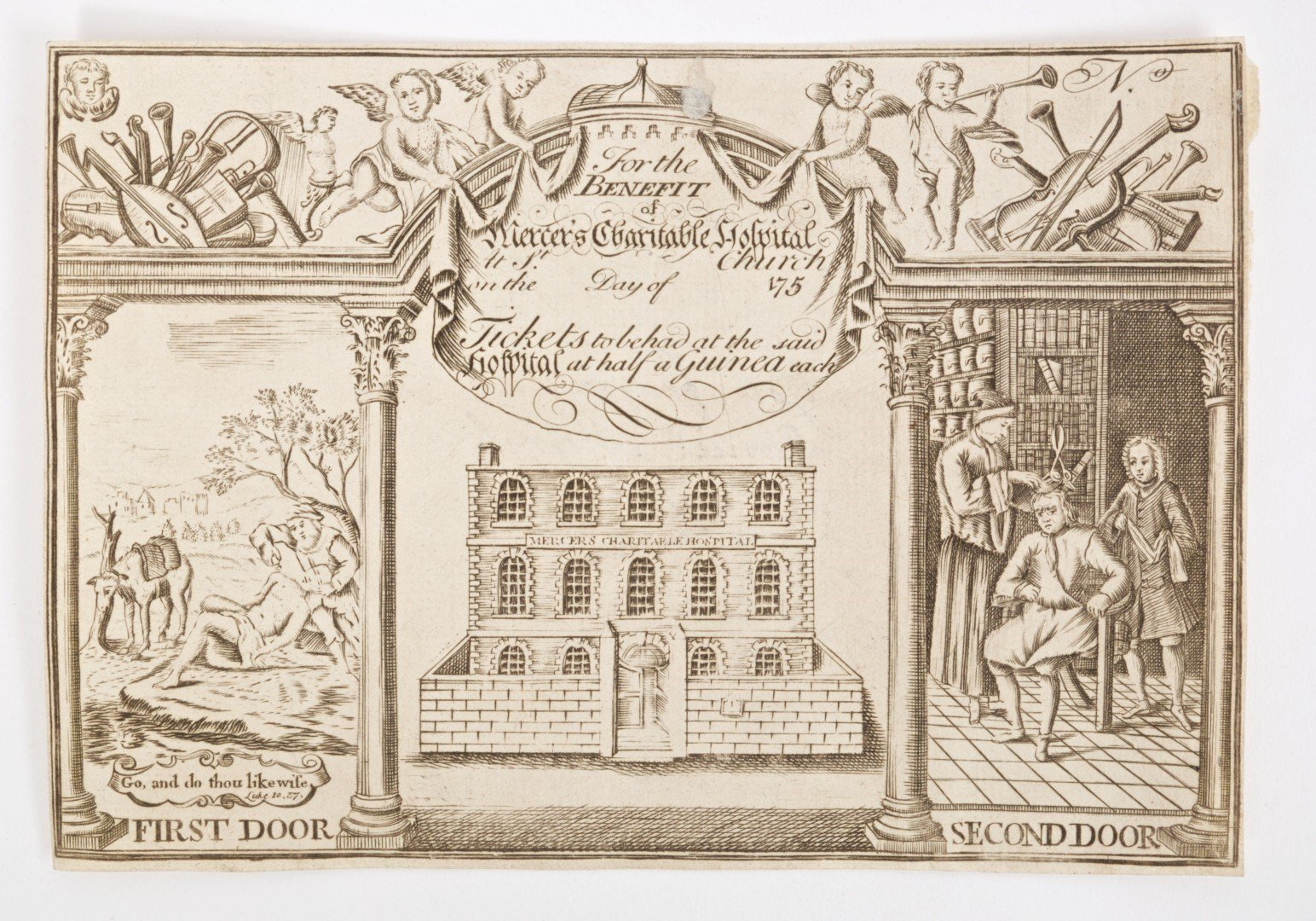
Mercer's hospital concert ticket

Mercer began leasing the site from a committee consisting of 'the Minister, Church Wardens and Parishioners of the Parish of St. Peter's, Dublin' with the aim of assisting 'twenty poor girls or other poor persons' there. Within a decade she had built a facility to help these people on the site. In May 1734, with the advice, direction & consent of the aforementioned St. Peter's committee, Mercer assigned unto a number of eminent surgeons the running of the facility who subsequently converted it into a hospital for patients suffering from "diseases of tedious and hazardous cure, such as falling-sickness, lunacy, leprosy, and the like". Mary Mercer died at her home in Great Ship Street on 4 March 1735.

Before Mercer had opened her hospital fully, Sir William Fownes, a wealthy landowner and MP for Wicklow, had petitioned Dublin Corporation in 1734 (alongside a group of doctors and clergymen) seeking money to turn Mercer's former school and almshouse into a designated hospital for 'lunatics, or such other poor people whose distempers are of tedious or doubtful cure, such as persons affected with cancers, king's evil, leprosy, falling sickness, etc.'. They particularly wanted the money to make 'provision for cells for raging lunatics' in the house, as Dublin was lacking in such facilities. In the end, Jonathan Swift's St. Patrick's Hospital for Imbeciles, opened in 1757, fulfilled this need.

To support funding for the fledgling hospital a number of concerts were arranged over the following years. The most significant of these was the first performance of Handel's Messiah, which took place in Neale's Musick Hall in Fishamble Street on 13 April 1742. To provide room for a large audience, ladies were requested to lay aside their hoops and gentlemen their swords. By this means an audience of 700 was crowded into the space, and the concert realised £400.

=== 1745 school relocation ===
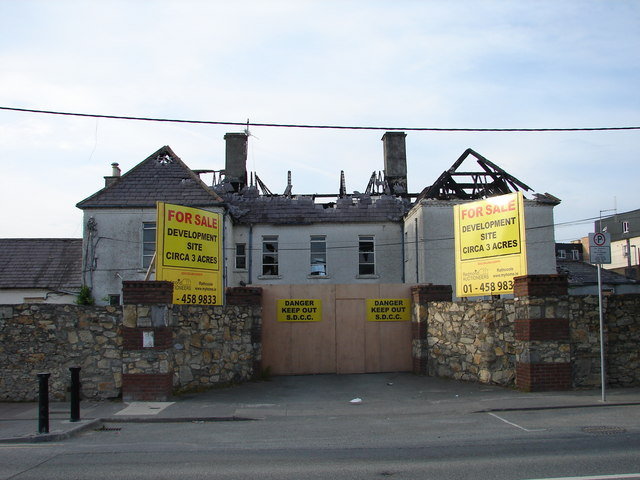
Fire damaged Mercer's School in Rathcoole photographed in 2008.

From 1743 to 1745, a new dedicated school was constructed in Rathcoole, County Dublin, to house and educate the girls who were removed from the central Dublin building which was deemed an unsuitable location. The building was designed by an architect by the name of Cummins.

=== 1759 building ===
The hospital was entirely rebuilt in the Georgian style in 1759 and much of this facade still exists as of 2024 facing North East. It was later incorporated into the newer Victorian building around 1884 with the main door left stranded off its split staircase.

=== 1884 building ===
The hospital was mostly rebuilt to a design by J.H. Brett in 1884. In the late 19th century Mercer's was one of the chief teaching hospitals in Dublin; it was located close to several schools of medicine, including Kirby's and the Ledwich school (run by Thomas Ledwich) in Peter Street. Ledwich's brother, Edward, became a surgeon and lecturer at the hospital. Among other surgeons who practised there in the latter half of the 19th century were Edward Stamer O'Grady.

In the late 1880s trouble broke out among the staff, leading to charges being brought against Dr. O'Grady, senior surgeon at the hospital. In October 1887 he was accused of insulting his professional colleagues to such an extent that they were unable to work with him. He had also charged one of the members of the board with loitering in the female ward for immodest purposes. Some of the staff left. Lectures were disrupted and the number of students fell. The row continued into the 1890s until finally he and most of the staff were dismissed by the governors, and he refused to seek re-election. O'Grady died at home on 18 October 1897. A new management team was appointed under the rule of Dr. ("Bull") Elliott in 1898: among them was Sir John Lumsden.

The hospital closed in 1983 and was acquired by the Royal College of Surgeons in Ireland who converted it into a clinical centre and medical library in 1991 keeping on the original front granite facade of the Georgian and Victorian buildings.

== Notable physicians ==
Among the notable physicians who have been associated with Mercer's Hospital are:

- Francis L'Estrange (1756–1836), physician born in County Westmeath who was educated as a surgeon. In 1779 he was appointed Assistant Surgeon to Mercer's Hospital, where he later became a surgeon. He was later appointed Assistant Surgeon to the House of Industry Hospitals, and surgeon to the Marine School. He engaged in obstetrical practice and was present at the birth of the poet, Thomas Moore (1779). He became president of the Royal College of Surgeons in Ireland in 1796.
- John Lumsden (1869–1944), the Principal Medical Officer for the Commissioners of Irish Lights, Chief Medical Officer at the Guinness Brewery and founder of the St John Ambulance Ireland.
- J. B. Lyons (1922–2007), a medical historian, writer, physician and professor of medicine.
- Jonathan Osborne (1794–1864), of Cullenswood House, Dublin, appointed physician about 1830.
- Robert Rowlette (c 1879–1944), a consultant and an independent Teachta Dála (TD). He was later a member of Seanad Éireann.

At the bi-centennial anniversary of the hospital in 1934 the staff included: Charles B. Maunsell, Seton Pringle, Bethel Solomons, William de Courcy Wheeler and Gibbon Fitzgibbon. House physicians were Dr. Wentworth Taylor and Dr. Muriel Smiddy.

== Sources ==
- Fealy, Gerard (2005). A History of Apprenticeship Nurse Training in Ireland. Routledge. ISBN 978-0415359979.
- Fleetwood, John F (1983). The History of Medicine in Ireland. Dublin: Skellig Press.
- Malcolm, Elizabeth (1989). Swift's Hospital: A History of St. Patrick's Hospital, Dublin, 1746-1989. Dublin: Gill and Macmillan. ISBN 0-7171-1501-1.
