= Darkey Kelly =

Irish brothel-keeper and alleged serial killer

- Born: Dorcas Kelly
- Died: 7 January 1761; Dublin, Ireland
- Other names: Darkey, Darky, Dorcas Stuart
- Occupation: Madam
- Conviction: Murder
- Penalty: Death by burning

Dorcas "Darkey" Kelly (died 7 January 1761) was an Irish brothel-keeper and alleged serial killer who was burned at the stake in Dublin in 1761.

== Biography ==
Dorcas Kelly was a madam who operated the Maiden Tower brothel on Copper Alley, off Fishamble Street in the southwest part of Dublin, Ireland. Convicted of killing shoemaker John Dowling on St. Patrick's Day 1760, Kelly was executed by partial hanging and burning at the stake on Gallows Road (modern Baggot Street) on 7 January 1761. After her execution she was waked by prostitutes on Copper Alley; thirteen of them were arrested for disorder and sent to Newgate Prison, Dublin.

An account of the 1773 execution of the murderer Mrs Herring at Tyburn, London, gives an idea of what Kelly's execution may have been like:

She was placed on a stool something more than two feet high, and, a chain being placed under her arms, the rope around her neck was made fast to two spikes, which, being driven through a post against which she stood, when her devotions were ended, the stool was taken from under her, and she was soon strangled. When she had hung about fifteen minutes, the rope was burnt, and she sunk till the chain supported her, forcing her hands up to a level with her face, and the flame being furious, she was soon consumed. The crowd was so immensely great that it was a long time before the faggots could be placed for the execution.

— Edward Cave ("Sylvanus Urban"), The gentleman’s magazine, and historical chronicle, Volume 43, London, 1773

A 1788 account in the World newspaper claims that her brothel was investigated by the authorities and that investigators then found the corpses of five men hidden in the vaults. However, this does not appear in any contemporary account of her trial and execution and appears to be a later embellishment.

== Legend ==
Various legends grew up around Kelly after her execution. The most common story is that she became pregnant with the child of Dublin's Sheriff Simon Luttrell, 1st Earl of Carhampton, a member of the Hellfire Club and probable client of Kelly's Maiden Tower. She demanded financial support from him. He responded by accusing her of witchcraft and of having killed their baby in a Satanic ritual. The body was never found. Darkey was then burnt at the stake.

This story may have its origin in one told about Luttrell's son Henry, who supposedly raped a girl in a brothel, and then had the girl and her family imprisoned under false charges.

== Legacy ==
A pub on Fishamble Street, near where her brothel once stood, is named Darkey Kelly's.

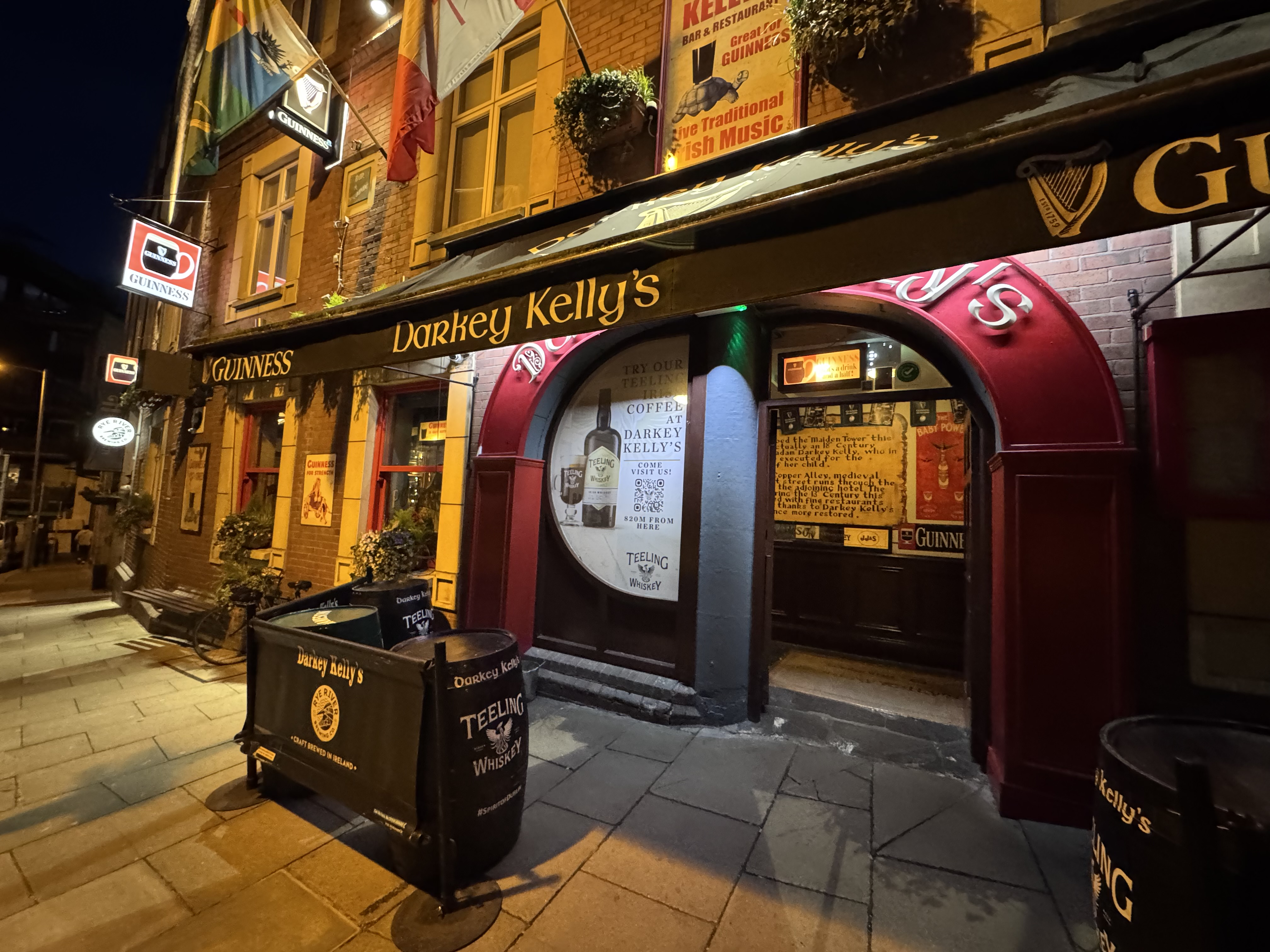
Entrance to Darkey Kelly’s pub

== See also ==
- List of serial killers by country
