= Francis L'Estrange =

Irish surgeon (c. 1756–1836)

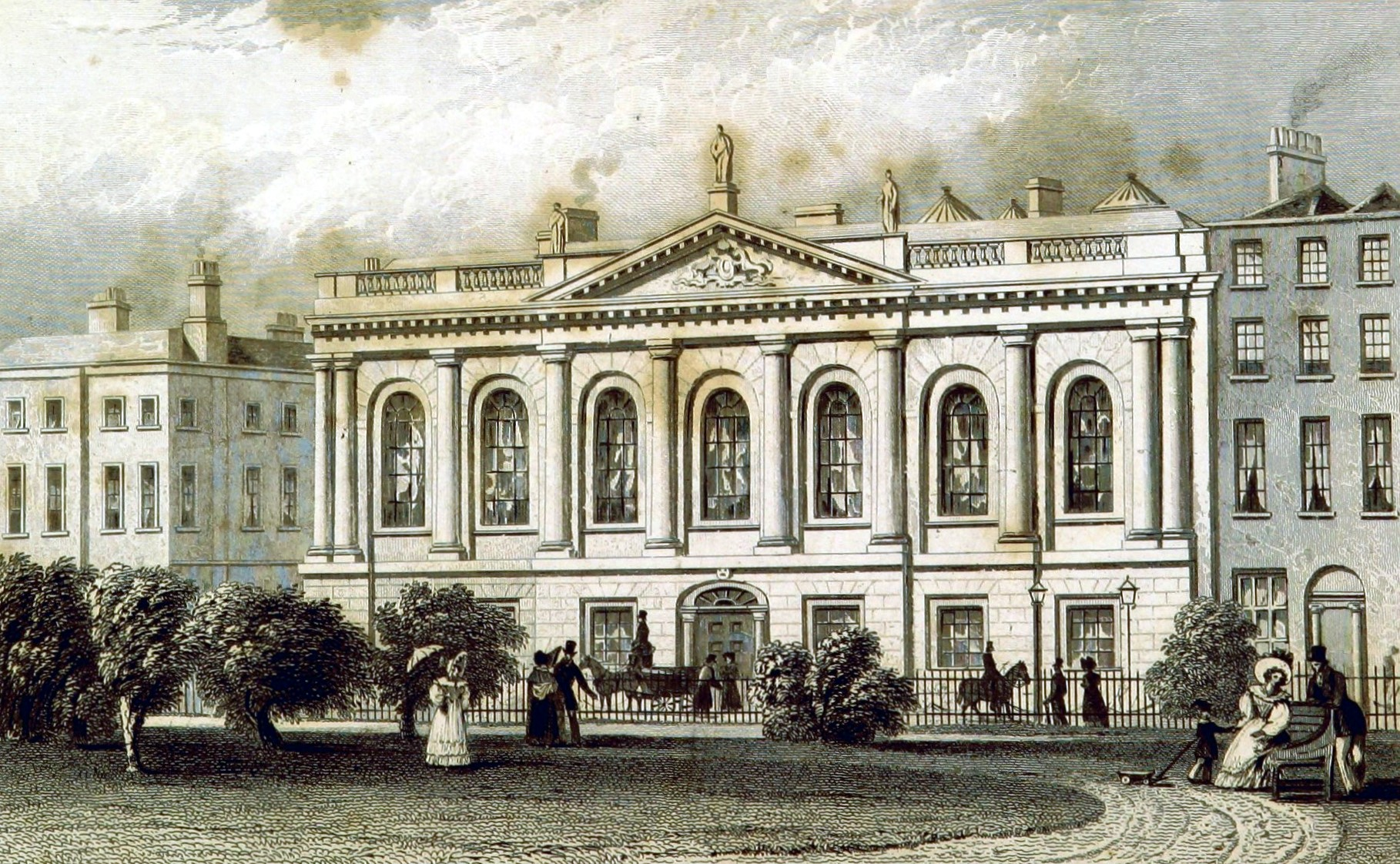
"The College of Surgeons, Dublin". 1837.

Francis L'Estrange (c. 1756 – 13 August 1836) was an Irish surgeon who served as President of the Royal College of Surgeons in Ireland (RCSI) in 1796.

F. L'Estrange was born around 1756 at Auburn (Boarstown), in County Westmeath. He was the youngest of the four sons of a country gentleman.

Educated as a surgeon, L'Estrange began to practise on Chatham Street in Dublin around 1778. In 1779, he was appointed Assistant-Surgeon to Mercer's Hospital, where he later became surgeon.

On 12 June 1786, L'Estrange was appointed Assistant-Surgeon to the House of Industry Hospitals, and was for many years Surgeon to the Marine School. L'Estrange engaged in surgical and obstetrical practice. He delivered the future poet Thomas Moore in Dublin on 28 May 1779.

L'Estrange married a Miss Spiels; their son, Francis, a Fellow of the College, became a dentist.

L'Estrange was appointed Justice of the Peace for Westmeath at a time when surgeons rarely held such a position.

L'Estrange died at age 80, on 13 August 1836.
