= Church of St. John the Evangelist, Dublin =

Former church in Ireland

Church of St. John the Evangelist
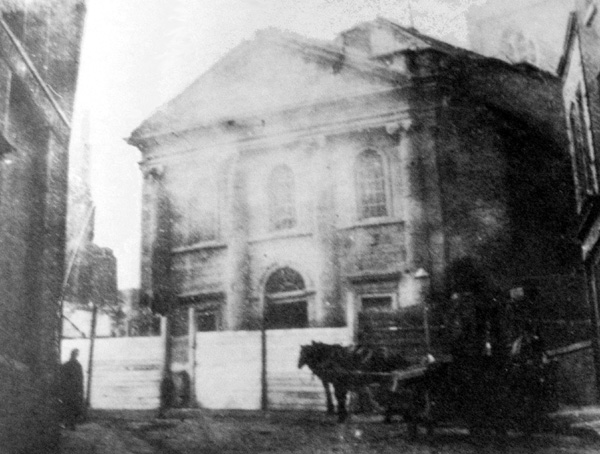
- Church of St. John the Evangelist
- 53.34435512403208°N 6.269261203357705°W
- Location: Fishamble Street, Dublin
- Country: Ireland
- Denomination: Church of Ireland

History
- Former name: St. John de Bothestret (1327)
- Founded: 1168
- Founder: Giolla Michell
- Dedication: St. John the Evangelist

Architecture
- Architect: George Ensor
- Style: Georgian, Neoclassical
- Completed: 1769 (final iteration)
- Closed: 1878
- Demolished: 1884

Administration
- Province: Province of Dublin

The Church of St. John the Evangelist was a Church of Ireland church located on the west side of Fishamble Street in the centre of Dublin, Ireland. It was founded in the 12th century, and a great many of its parish records survive.

== The Church ==
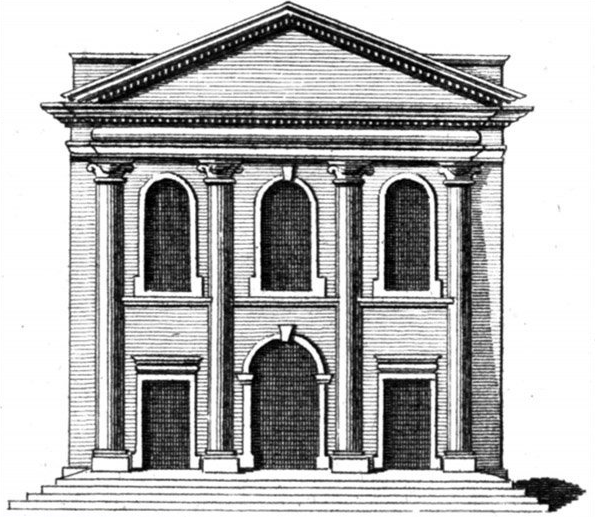
From an illustration in the Gentleman's Magazine in August 1785.

According to Sir John Gilbert the church was built in 1168 by a native Irishman called Giolla Michell. It was then attached to the Church of the Most Holy Trinity (Christ Church), which was run by the Augustinian Order. Fishamble Street in those times reached only as far as Neal's Music Hall, the rest, where the church was located, was called Bothestret. In the church, there was a chapel to St. Mary and one to St. John, which was used by the Guild of Tailors.

In the 14th century at Easter, a Miracle Play, on the subject of the Resurrection, was performed in the church.

An Arland Ussher (died 1557), a nephew of the Mayor of Dublin, rebuilt the church. The new church consisted of a chancel, nave and two aisles. There were vaults underneath the church and a belfry contained three bells.

The church was rebuilt in 1681. Its walls were only 24 feet (7.5 metres) high. There were 42 pews, which were shared among several families. The names Bladen, Hutchinson, Forster, Crumpe, Crossart, Thompson, Grimes, Reeves, Stacey and Shipley, among others, are recorded.

=== 1773 rebuilding ===
In the mid 18th-century a committee was formed to raise funds for yet another renovation of the church. They were successful in raising thousands of pounds from the government and smaller sums from other sources, so the church was rebuilt to a design by George Ensor and re-opened in 1773.

The pews were auctioned to the highest bidders, providing those with the most money with the best seats. Alderman Robert Smith contributed funds to buy an organ, from William Gibson of Grafton St., but unfortunately, it never worked properly.

The interior of the church was described as plain but handsome, with the galleries fronted with oak, varnished and panelled. On the front of one of the galleries was the crest of the Guild of tailors with its Latin motto, "I was naked and you clothed me" which may have been taken from an earlier iteration of Tailors' Hall on nearby Winetavern Street.

The church was closed in 1878, after the parish was united with that of St. Werburgh. The pulpit and other pieces were taken to that church. The church was later converted into a parochial hall in 1879.

It was demolished in 1884 to make way for a new Mission Hall designed by James Franklin Fuller in 1886.

== The churchyard ==
There was a graveyard attached to the church immediately to the North; the first tombstone mentioned is that of William Scriven, in 1681 although there is at least one record of an earlier burial in 1648, of the High Court judge Sir William Ryves. Many titled people, aldermen, sheriffs, members of parliament, lawyers, clergy, lord mayors, and scholars were buried there. The last mentioned is that of Elizabeth Frances McAusland in 1850. It is estimated that there were more than 12,500 burials in total.

John Atherton (1598-1640), Bishop of Waterford and Lismore, requested that his body be interred "in a rubbish dump in the corner of the churchyard in Fishamble St" after his execution on Oxmantown Green on 5 December 1640.

== The parish ==
The parish, which covered the area around the now-closed Catholic Church of St. Michael and John, was a union of two older divisions: St. John's and St. Olaf's. The latter, founded in the first half of the 11th century, commemorated Olaf I, King of Norway, and its church was located in what is present-day Essex St. The parishes were formally united in 1558. The parish corresponded with the civil parish of St. John.

== Notable parishioners ==
In 1748, Thomas Sheridan paid for a pew for the use of his players in the Smock Alley theatre. In 1746, Henry Grattan was born nearby and baptised at this church. The writer John Duncan Craig was a curate here in the mid-1850s.

In 1818 Jeremiah John Moore was baptised here - in 1842 he migrated to Australia and opened the first bookshop in Sydney in George Street, opposite St Andrews Cathedral and the Town Hall.

== References and sources ==
Notes

Sources

- Gilbert, John (1854). A History of the City of Dublin. Oxford: Oxford University Press.
- George Newenham Wright (1825) An Historical Guide to Ancient and Modern Dublin; 2nd ed.
- Samuel Carlyle Hughes The Church of S. John the Evangelist, Dublin, Dublin, 1889. Reprinted by Kessinger Publishing, 2009.
