= Fishamble Street =

Street in Dublin, Ireland

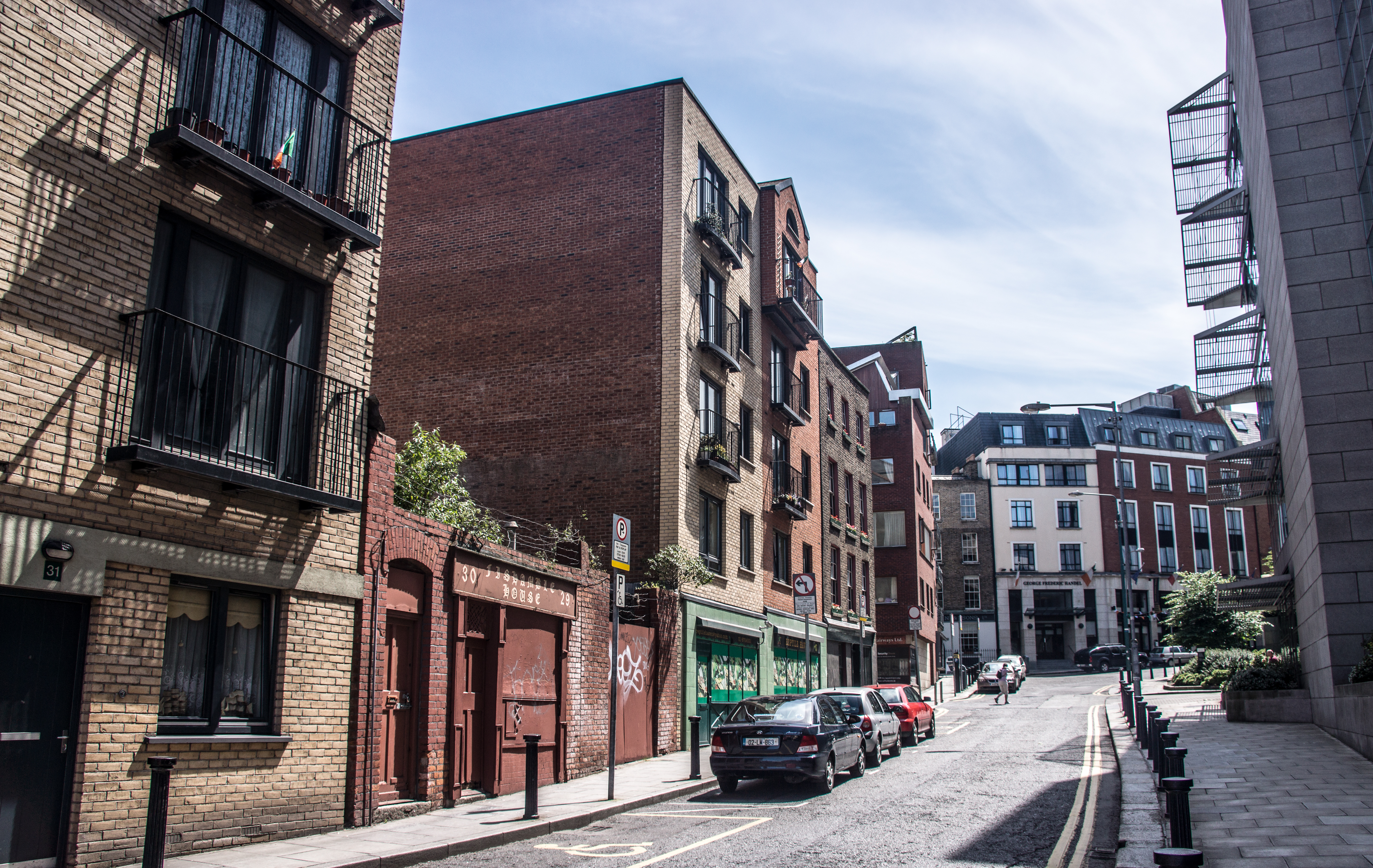

- Location within Central Dublin
- Native name: Sráid Sheamlas an Éisc (Irish)
- Namesake: Medieval fish shambles
- Length: 180 m (590 ft)
- Width: 13 metres (43 ft)
- Location: Dublin, Ireland
- Postal code: D08
- Coordinates: 53°20′38″N 6°16′12″W
- north end: Wood Quay, Essex Quay
- south end: Christchurch Place, Lord Edward Street

Other
- Known for: medieval fish market, pubs, Music Hall

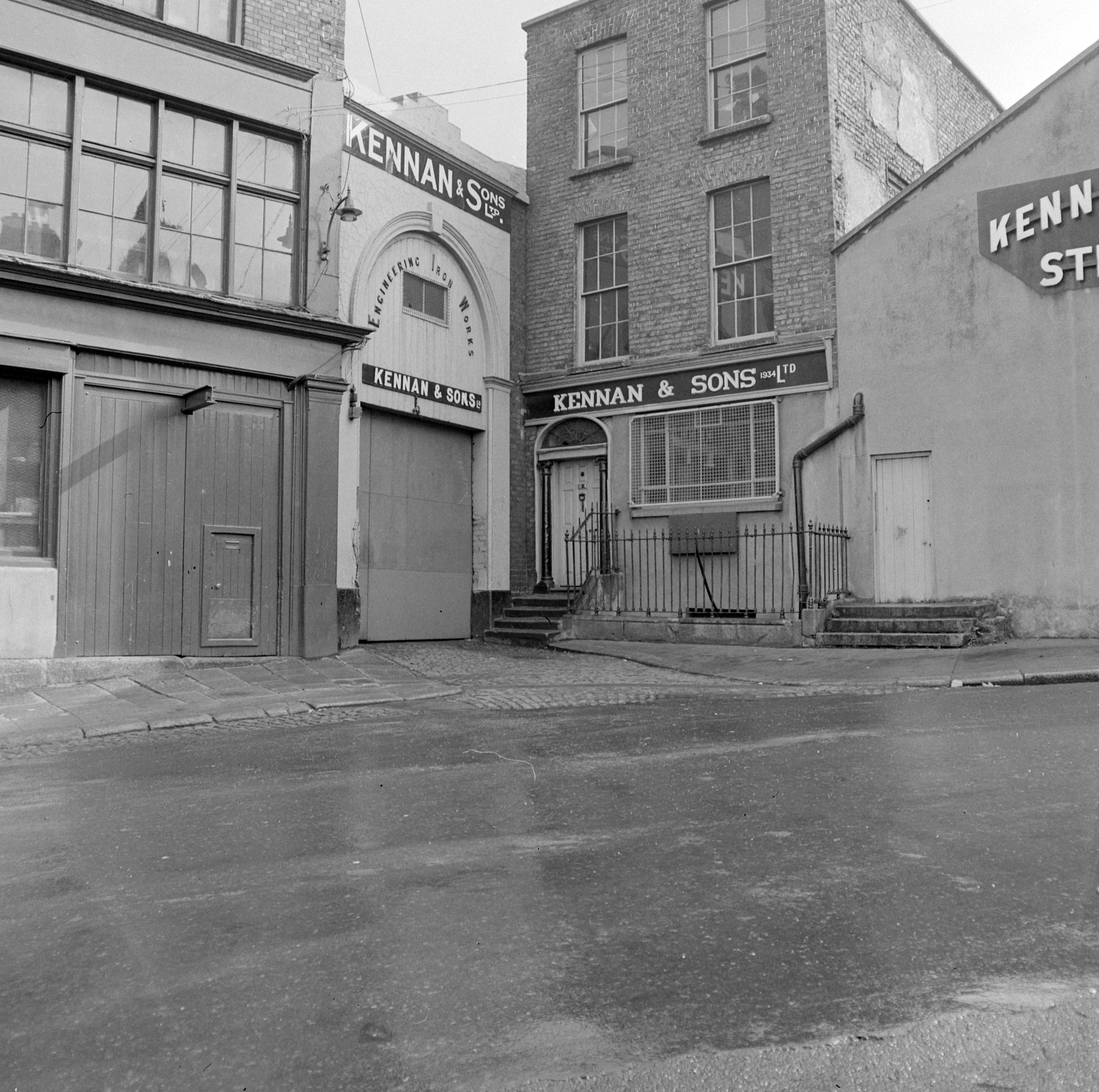
Fishamble St in 1967, with the archway to what was once Neal's Music Hall

Fishamble Street (/ˈfɪʃæmbəl/; Irish: Sráid Sheamlas an Éisc) is a street in Dublin, Ireland within the old city walls.

== Location ==
The street joins Wood Quay at the Fish Slip near Fyan's Castle. It originally ran from Castle Street to Essex Quay until the creation of Lord Edward Street in 1886.

== History ==
It is mentioned in the 14th century as Vicus Piscariorum, Viscus Piscariæ, and as Fish Street. In 1577, Stanihurst named it St John's Street. In the fifteenth century, it was referred to as "the Fishamyls". John Estrete, the eminent judge and statesman, owned a house here in 1483, which he sold to Philip Fleming two years later. In 1610, some editions of Speed's map call it Fish Shambles. During the 1950s it was for a time officially considered part of Moore Street, though in practice it retained its separate identity.

The street was known as the official fish market for Dublin until the end of the 17th century when the city markets were moved to the north bank of the Liffey. ("Shambles" were meat markets and open-air slaughterhouse districts, and the word occurs in several British and Irish street names, such as The Shambles in York.)

Fishamble Street was the birthplace of both Henry Grattan, an Irish politician and lawyer, and James Clarence Mangan, a 19th-century poet.

== Notable buildings ==
=== Neale's Musick Hall ===
A music hall opened in 1741, which hosted the first public performance of Handel's Messiah on 13 April 1742 before a large audience. Daniel O'Connell addressed an audience in the theatre on 28 February 1812. The building was eventually incorporated into a factory in 1868.

=== General Post Office ===
The General Post Office was located here and remained for around 30 years before moving to Sycamore Alley and later again to Fownes Court in Temple Bar and then to College Green.

=== Church of St John ===
The Church of St. John the Evangelist was located here until it was demolished around 1884 as part of larger works which included the laying out of Lord Edward Street.

=== Deanery House ===
The Deanery House of Christchurch Cathedral which was designed by Edward Lovett Pearce was located here adjacent to St John's church in the shadow of the cathedral until it was also demolished around the same time as St John's in the 1880s.

=== Taverns ===
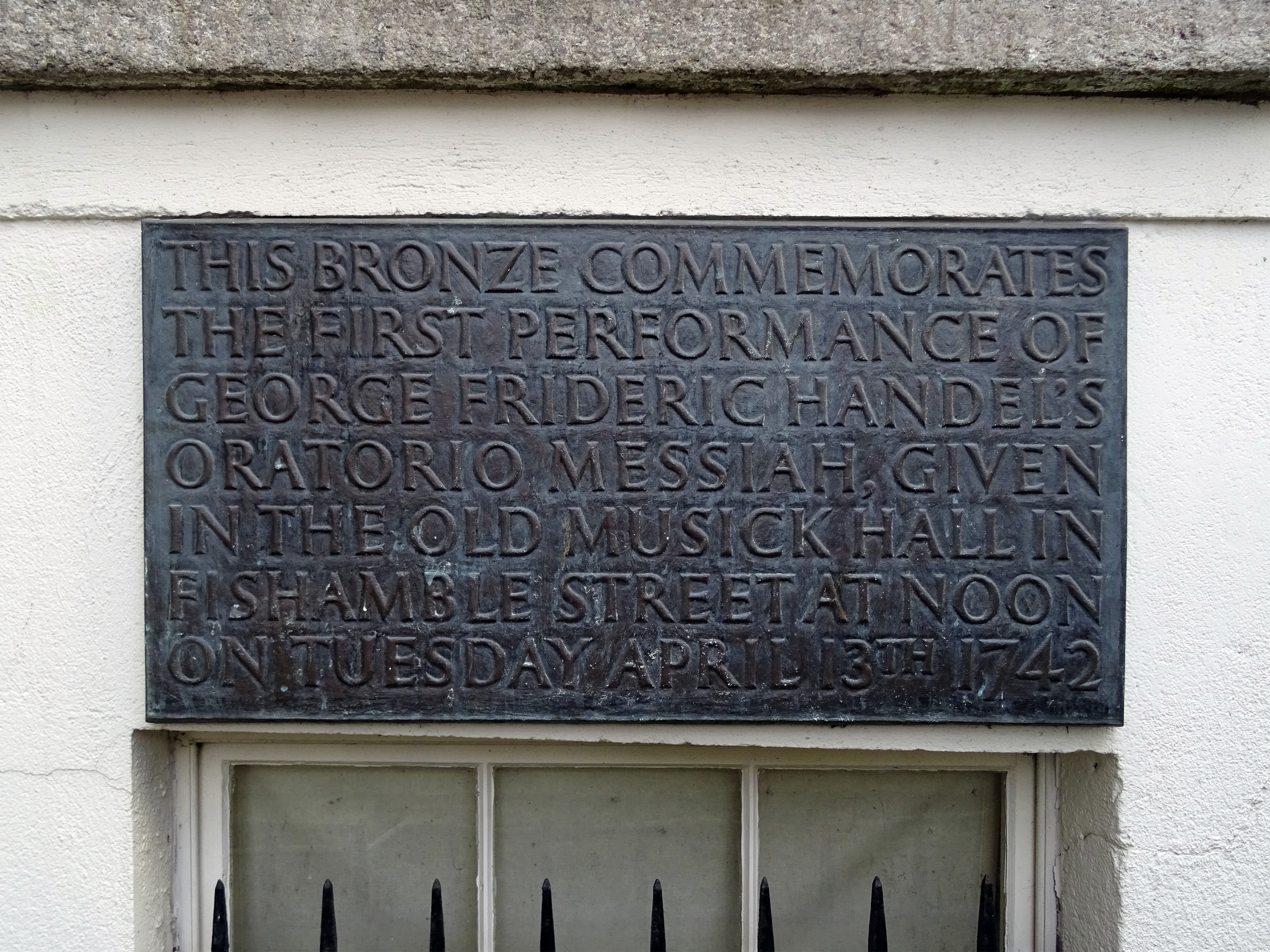
Plaque commemorating Handel's Messiah

In the 18th century, a tavern on the street, the Bull's Head, was one of the most popular and well-known establishments in Dublin, and was in demand for anniversary and celebratory dinners by the various city guilds and bodies. It also provided accommodation for assemblies of the Grand Lodge of Irish Freemasons. The Bull's Head Musical Society was also well known and was the group that undertook the building of Neale's Musick Hall. A pub further up on Thomas Street was known as G. F. Handel's before changing its name to Arthur's.

Fishamble Street is also home to Darkey Kelly's, a well-known Dublin music pub. It was named after Dorcas Kelly, who ran a popular brothel in the street in the 1750s and was executed for murder in 1761.

== See also ==
- List of streets and squares in Dublin
