= Christmas cantata =

Cantata intended to be performed for Christmas

A Christmas cantata or Nativity cantata is a cantata, music for voice or voices in several movements, for Christmas. The importance of the feast inspired many composers to write cantatas for the occasion, some designed to be performed in church services, others for concert or secular celebration. The Christmas story, telling of music of the angels and suggesting music of the shepherds and cradle song, invited musical treatment. The term is called Weihnachtskantate in German, and Cantate de Noël in French. Christmas cantatas have been written on texts in several other languages, such as Czech, Italian, Romanian, and Spanish.

Christmas cantata can also mean the performance of the music. Many choirs have a tradition of an annual Christmas cantata.

== Theme ==
Different from Christmas oratorios, which present the Christmas story, Christmas cantatas deal with aspects of it. Bach's Christmas Oratorio, written for performance in Leipzig in 1734/1735 touches many of these themes. It consists of six parts, each part is a complete work and composed for the church service of a specific feast day. Bach structured the report from the Gospels which connects the parts to a whole, as told by the Evangelist, in six topics. In Parts I to IV he followed the Gospel of Luke (Luke 2:3–21), in Parts V and VI the Gospel of Matthew (Matthew 2:1–12). In some instances he deviated from the prescribed readings, rather continuing the tradition of older works by Heinrich Schütz and others.

- Part I, Jauchzet, frohlocket!, for Christmas Day (25 December): Nativity of Jesus
- Part II, Und es waren Hirten in derselben Gegend, for the Second Day of Christmas (26 December): Annunciation to the shepherds, Glory to God, peace on earth
- Part III for the Third Day of Christmas (27 December): Adoration of the shepherds
- Part IV, Fallt mit Danken, fallt mit Loben, for New Year's Day (1 January): Naming of Jesus
- Part V for the first Sunday after New Year's Day: Biblical Magi
- Part VI for Epiphany (6 January): Adoration of the Magi

These themes appear also in cantatas of later composers.

== History ==
Many Christmas cantatas – as cantatas in general – were written in the Baroque era for church services, related to the prescribed readings of the liturgical year. Cantata texts frequently incorporated Bible quotations and chorale. Chorale cantatas rely on the text of one chorale only. Later composers also set free text, poems and carols.

=== Italian baroque ===
The cantata form originated in Italy, alongside the oratorio. Carissimi's pupil Marc-Antoine Charpentier brought the small-scale Latin Christmas oratorio to Paris (In nativitatem Domini canticum), while the vernacular Italian Christmas cantata was developed by composers such as Alessandro Stradella (Si apra al riso ogni labro 1675), Francesco Provenzale (Per la nascita del Verbo 1683) and Alessandro Scarlatti in Naples, Antonio Caldara in Vienna (Vaticini di pace 1713).

=== German baroque ===
==== Bach ====
The best known Christmas cantatas today are those of Johann Sebastian Bach, who composed several cantatas for the three days of Christmas in his three annual cantata cycles (1723 to 1725), also before and afterwards:

- First Day
  - Christen, ätzet diesen Tag, BWV 63, 1713? 1716?
  - Gelobet seist du, Jesu Christ, BWV 91, 25 December 1724, on Luther's hymn
  - Unser Mund sei voll Lachens, BWV 110, 25 December 1725
  - Ehre sei Gott in der Höhe, BWV 197a, 25 December ?1728 (partly lost)
  - Gloria in excelsis Deo, BWV 191, 25 December 1745
- Second Day
  - Darzu ist erschienen der Sohn Gottes, BWV 40, 26 December 1723
  - Christum wir sollen loben schon, BWV 121, 26 December 1724, on Luther's hymn
  - Selig ist der Mann, BWV 57, 26 December 1725
- Third Day
  - Sehet, welch eine Liebe hat uns der Vater erzeiget, BWV 64, 27 December 1723
  - Ich freue mich in dir, BWV 133, 27 December 1724, on a hymn by Caspar Ziegler
  - Süßer Trost, mein Jesus kömmt, BWV 151, 27 December 1725

In the works of Bach's second cycle of chorale cantatas (1724), the text of the chorale is kept for the outer stanzas, but rephrased in poetry for arias and recitatives in the other stanzas. His late cantata Gloria in excelsis Deo is derived from the Gloria in his Missa in B minor, which he had composed for the court of Dresden in 1733 and would later incorporate in his Mass in B minor. Therefore, the cantata is for five parts and in Latin. The text of the liturgical Gloria begins with the angels' song, as a link to the Christmas story.

==== Other German Baroque composers ====
Gottfried Heinrich Stölzel composed for the season 1736/1737 a structure of six cantatas for six feast days around Christmas, similar to Bach's Christmas Oratorio, including Kündlich groß ist das gottselige Geheimnis. More of his Christmas cantatas were published in 2007 by Hofmeister. Christmas cantatas were also composed by Georg Gebel, Christoph Graupner, Andreas Hammerschmidt, Arnold Brunckhorst, Johann Samuel Beyer, Philipp Buchner, David Pohle, Johann Hermann Schein, Friedrich Wilhelm Zachow and Thomas Selle, among others.

=== Classical period ===
During the Age of Enlightenment, church music was less prominent. In 1796 Jakub Jan Ryba wrote Česká mše vánoční, which tells within the frame of a Mass a Christmas story in Czech, set in pastoral Bohemia.

=== Romantic period ===
During the romantic era, Felix Mendelssohn composed the chorale cantata Vom Himmel hoch based on Luther's hymn "Vom Himmel hoch, da komm ich her", and Josef Rheinberger wrote Der Stern von Bethlehem (The star of Bethlehem) on a text by his wife Franziska von Hoffnaaß. Christmas cantatas were also composed by Gerard von Brucken Fock (1900), Charles H. Gabriel and Friedrich Theodor Fröhlich among others.

=== 20th century ===
In the 20th century, Benjamin Britten set in 1942 a sequence of carols as A Ceremony of Carols. His cantata Saint Nicolas, written in 1948, after World War II, has also been termed a Christmas cantata. Rudolf Mauersberger composed for the Dresdner Kreuzchor which he conducted, Eine kleine Weihnachtskantate (A little Christmas cantata). Ralph Vaughan Williams wrote Hodie, and Arthur Honegger composed as his last work Une cantate de Noël for the Basler Kammerchor and their founder Paul Sacher. He began his work with a setting of Psalm 130 and continued with carols. Christmas cantatas were also composed by Geoffrey Bush, Steve Dobrogosz, Geoffrey Grey, Iain Hamilton, Julius Harrison, Hans Uwe Hielscher, Mathilde Kralik, Ivana Loudová, Daniel Pinkham (1957), Ned Rorem, K. Lee Scott, Otto Albert Tichý and Arnold van Wyk, among others. A Christmas cantata outside the classical music tradition was the 1986 project The Animals' Christmas by Jimmy Webb and Art Garfunkel.

In 1995, Bruckner's Fest-Kantate Preiset den Herrn, WAB 16, has undergone an adaptation as Festkantate zur Weihnacht (festive Christmas cantata) for mixed choir with Herbert Vogg's text "Ehre sei Gott in der Höhe".

=== 21st century ===
In the 21st century, new Christmas cantatas have been written among others by Toshio Hosokawa and Graham Waterhouse.

== Scoring ==
All Christmas cantatas consist of several movements, most movements include solo and choral singing. The scoring can be chamber music to be performed by single singers and instruments, choir a cappella, and works for soloists, choir and orchestra. Several composers specifically asked for a children's choir. Trumpets feature prominently in many Baroque cantatas as the Royal instruments.

== Cantatas ==
The table uses abbreviations: S = soprano, MS = mezzo-soprano, A = alto, T = tenor, Bar = baritone, B = bass, childr = children's choir, Str = strings, Instr = instruments, Tr = tromba (trumpet), Co = horn, Cn = cornett, Tb = trombone, Ti = timpani, Fl = recorder, Ft = flauto traverso, Ob = oboe, Oa = Oboe d'amore, Oc = Oboe da caccia, Vn = violin, Va = viola, Vc = cello, Fg = bassoon, Org = organ, Bc = basso continuo

Composer	born	Cantata title	No.	Text	composed	Scoring	Premiere	Notes
Francesco Provenzale	1624	Sui palchi delle stelle			1689	S 2Vl Bc		
Cristoforo Caresana	1640?	L'Adoratione de' Maggi			1676	6 voices		
(unknown)		Uns ist ein Kind geboren	BWV 142	Erdmann Neumeister	1711–56	A T B SATB; 2Fl 2Ob 2Vl Va Bc		first attributed to Bach
Friedrich Wilhelm Zachow	1663	Uns ist ein Kind geboren				S A T B SATB; Ob Fg 2Vl 2Va Bc		and others
Arnold Matthias Brunckhorst	1670?	Nun zeiget der Himmel die schönsten Gebärden / In festo nativitate Christi				S A T B SATB; 6 Instr Bc		
Georg Philipp Telemann	1681	Ehre sei Gott in der Höhe; In festo nativitatis	TWV 1:412			S A T B SATB; 3Tr Ti Str Bc		
Georg Philipp Telemann	1681	Uns ist ein Kind geboren	TWV 1:1451	Erdmann Neumeister		S A T B SATB; 3Tr Ti 2Ft 2Ob Str Bc		
Johann Sebastian Bach	1685	Christen, ätzet diesen Tag	BWV 63	Johann Michael Heineccius?	1713?	S A T B SATB; 4Tr Ti 3Ob Fg 2Vl Va Bc		First Day
Johann Sebastian Bach	1685	Sehet, welch eine Liebe hat uns der Vater erzeiget	BWV 64		1723	S A B SATB; Cn 3Tb Oa 2Vl Va Bc	27 Dec 1723; Leipzig	Third Day
Johann Sebastian Bach	1685	Gelobet seist du, Jesu Christ	BWV 91	"Gelobet seist du, Jesu Christ"	1724	S A T B SATB; 2Co Ti 3Ob 2Vl Va Bc	25 Dec 1724; Leipzig	chorale
Johann Sebastian Bach	1685	Christum wir sollen loben schon	BWV 121	"Christum wir sollen loben schon"	1724	S A T B SATB; Cn 3Tr Oa 2Vl Va Bc	26 Dec 1724; Leipzig	Second Day, chorale
Johann Sebastian Bach	1685	Ich freue mich in dir	BWV 133	hymn by Caspar Ziegler	1724	S A T B SATB; Cn 2Oa 2Vl Va Bc	27 Dec 1724; Leipzig	Third Day, chorale
Johann Sebastian Bach	1685	Unser Mund sei voll Lachens	BWV 110	Georg Christian Lehms	1725	S B SATB; 3Tr Ti 2Ft 3Ob Oa Oc Fg 2Vl Va Bc	25 Dec 1725; Leipzig	First Day
Johann Sebastian Bach	1685	Selig ist der Mann	BWV 57	Georg Christian Lehms	1725	S B SATB; 2Ob 2Vl Va Bc	26 Dec 1725; Leipzig	Second Day
Johann Sebastian Bach	1685	Gloria in excelsis Deo	BWV 191	Gloria, Doxology	1745	S T SSATB; 3Tr Ti 2Ft 2Ob 2Vl Va Bc	25 Dec 1745	First Day
Gottfried Heinrich Stölzel	1690	Kündlich groß ist das gottselige Geheimnis			1736	S A SATB; Ob 2Vl Va Bc	27 Dec 1736	Third Day
Christian Heinrich Rinck	1777	Weihnachtskantate	op. 73					
Felix Mendelssohn	1809	Vom Himmel hoch	MWV A 10	"Vom Himmel hoch, da komm ich her"	1831	S Bar SSATB orchestra		chorale
Josef Rheinberger	1839	Der Stern von Bethlehem		Franziska von Hoffnaaß	1891	soli choir orchestra		
John Henry Maunder	1858	Bethlehem		Catharine Morgan	1939?			in the manner of the medieval miracle play
William Reed	1859	The Message of the Angels			1910			
Felix Woyrsch	1860	Die Geburt Jesu	op. 18	Bible	1910	soli choir orchestra		
Ralph Vaughan Williams	1872	Hodie		Ursula Vaughan Williams	1953–54	S T Bar choir orchestra		
Ottorino Respighi	1879	Lauda per la Natività del Signore		Jacopone da Todi?	1930	S MS T SSAATTBB woodwinds, piano 4 hands		
Walter Braunfels	1882	Der gläserne Berg, Weihnachtsmärchen	op. 39		1928			
Walter Braunfels	1882	Weihnachtskantate	op. 52		1934–37	S Bar choir orchestra		
Rudolf Mauersberger	1889	Weihnachtszyklus der Kruzianer			1944–46	soli choir SATB SATB a cappella (piano)		
Rudolf Mauersberger	1889	Eine kleine Weihnachtskantate			1948			
Frank Martin	1890	Cantate pour le temps de Noel			1929–30			
Gerald Finzi	1893	Dies natalis		Thomas Traherne	1939	S (T); Str		
Arthur Honegger	1893	Une cantate de Noël		Ps. 130, Lieder	1952–53	Bar choir childr Org orchestra	18 Dec 1953; Basel	
Kurt Hessenberg	1908	Weihnachtskantate	op. 27	Matthias Claudius	1950–51	S A SSATBB orchestra		published by Schott
Benjamin Britten	1913	A Ceremony of Carols	op. 28		1942	boys' choir harp		
William Lloyd Webber	1913	Born a King				soli choir Org		
Lee Hoiby	1926	A Hymn of the Nativity		Richard Crashaw				
Gilbert Bécaud	1927	L'enfant à L'étoile			1960			
Ariel Ramírez	1921	Navidad Nuestra		Félix Luna	1963	S T choir South American instr		
Malcolm Williamson	1931	Adoremus			1959	A T SATB; Org		
Nils Lindberg	1933	A Christmas Cantata			2002	S Bar chamber choir big band		St Matthew and carols, recorded
Gerhard Track	1934	Festkantate zur Weihnacht		Herbert Vogg	1995	SATB choir Wind Instr, Org	29 April 1996, Vienna	Adaptation Bruckner's Fest-Kantate
Thomas Oboe Lee	1945	Christmas Cantata			2001	MS SATB; 2Tr 2Tb Ti Org		
Peter Skellern	1947	The Nativity Cantata			2004		2004	
Otomar Kvěch	1950	Vánoční chvalozpěv			1973	soli choir orchestra		
Mark Carlson	1952	A Wreath of Anthems		various American poets	1990	SATB orchestra		
Toshio Hosokawa	1955	Weihnachtskantate		anon.	2002	S A choir orchestra	20 Dec 2002; München	published by Schott
Maria Newman	1962	A Little Book of Southern Carols			2008	SSA (treble or boy's choir) treble vocal soli piano, handbells (or chimes), percussion, and violin (or flute/recorder), and viola	2008	published by Montgomery Arts House Press
Graham Waterhouse	1962	Der Anfang einer neuen Zeit		Hans Krieger	2011	S Bar choir childr Str (Org)	3/4 Dec 2011; Essen	
Frederik Magle	1977	A newborn child, before eternity, God!			1996	soli choir brass band, Org, percussion		

== Literature ==
- Alfred Dürr: Johann Sebastian Bach: Die Kantaten. Bärenreiter, Kassel 1999, ISBN 3-7618-1476-3
- Werner Neumann: Handbuch der Kantaten J.S.Bachs, 1947, 1984, ISBN 3-7651-0054-4
- Hans-Joachim Schulze: Die Bach-Kantaten: Einführungen zu sämtlichen Kantaten Johann Sebastian Bachs. Leipzig: Evangelische Verlags-Anstalt; Stuttgart: Carus-Verlag 2006 (Edition Bach-Archiv Leipzig) ISBN 3-374-02390-8 (Evang. Verl.-Anst.), ISBN 3-89948-073-2 (Carus-Verlag)
- Christoph Wolff/Ton Koopman: Die Welt der Bach-Kantaten Verlag J.B. Metzler, Stuttgart, Weimar 2006 ISBN 978-3-476-02127-4
