= Gelobet seist du, Jesu Christ, BWV 91 =

1724 church cantata by Johann Sebastian Bach

Gelobet seist du, Jesu Christ
- BWV 91
- Christmas cantata; Chorale cantata; by J. S. Bach
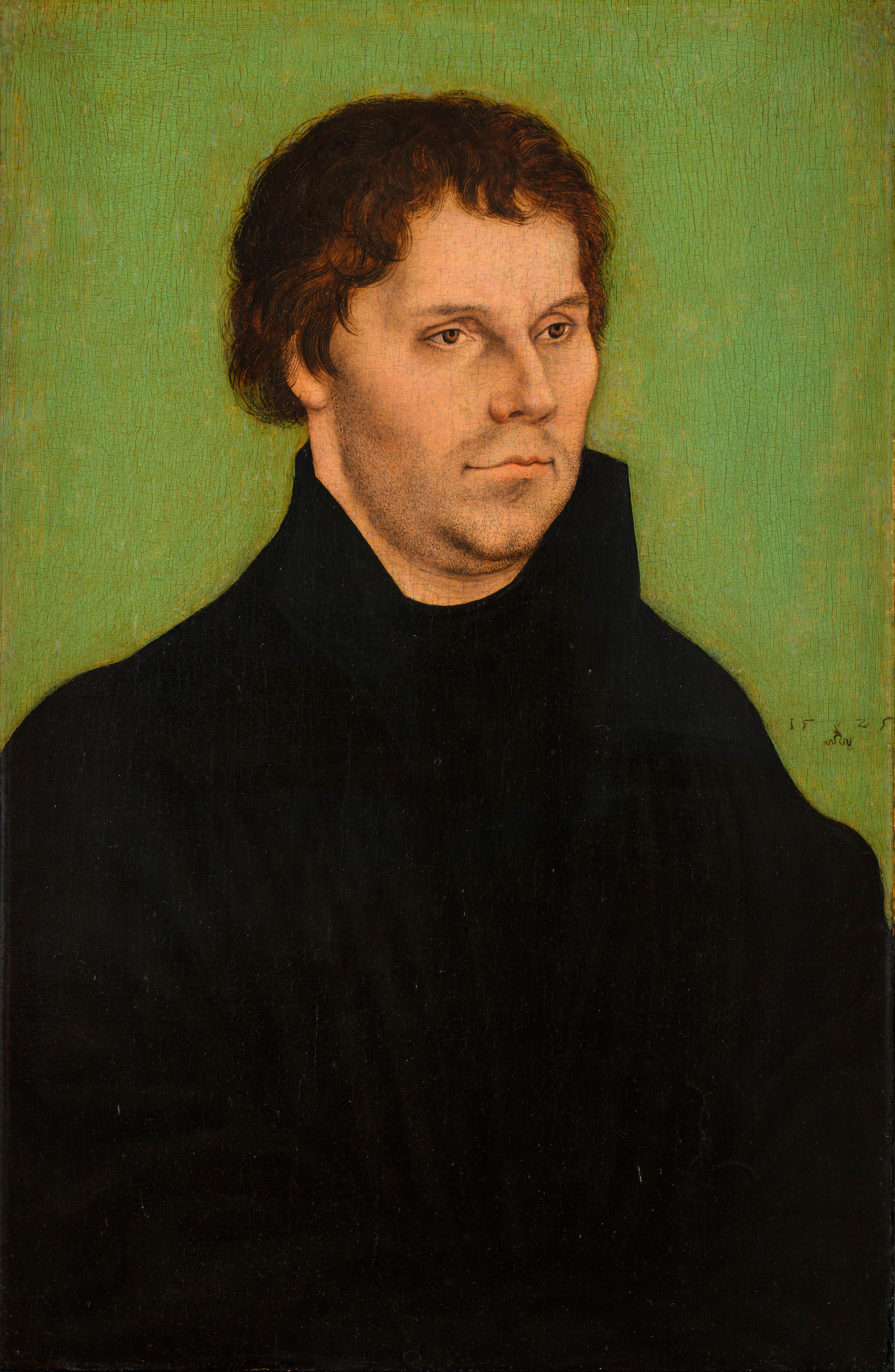
- Martin Luther, author of the hymn, in 1525, by Lucas Cranach the Elder
- Chorale: "Gelobet seist du, Jesu Christ" by Martin Luther
- Performed: 25 December 1724: Leipzig
- Movements: 6
- Vocal: SATB choir and solo
- Instrumental: 2 horns; timpani; 3 oboes; 2 violins; viola; continuo

Gelobet seist du, Jesu Christ (Praise be to You, Jesus Christ), BWV 91, is a church cantata by Johann Sebastian Bach. He wrote the Christmas cantata in Leipzig in 1724 for Christmas Day and first performed it on 25 December. It is based on the hymn "Gelobet seist du, Jesu Christ" by Martin Luther which was 200 years old when Bach wrote the work.

The cantata belongs to Bach's chorale cantata cycle, the second cantata cycle during his tenure as Thomaskantor that began in 1723. The cantata text retains the first and last stanza of the chorale unchanged for a chorale fantasia and a four-part chorale setting, while an unknown librettist paraphrased the inner stanzas into alternating recitatives and arias.

The cantata is scored for four vocal soloists, a four-part choir, and a Baroque instrumental ensemble of two horns, timpani, three oboes, strings and basso continuo.

== History and words ==
Gelobet seist du, Jesu Christ from Bach's chorale cantata cycle is based on the main chorale for Christmas Day, Luther's "Gelobet seist du, Jesu Christ". This song was published in 1524, thus was 200 years old when Bach composed his work. Its beginning summarizes Christmas in two lines: "Gelobet seist du, Jesu Christ, daß du Mensch geboren bist" (Praise be to You, Jesus Christ, since You were born a man). All seven stanzas end with the acclamation Kyrieleis. The cantata was Bach's first composed for Christmas Day in Leipzig; in his first year in Leipzig 1723 he had chosen to perform Christen, ätzet diesen Tag, BWV 63 again, written for the occasion earlier in Weimar.

The prescribed readings for the feast day were from the Epistle to Titus, "God's mercy appeared" (Titus 2:11–14) alternating with Isaiah, "Unto us a child is born" (Isaiah 9:2–7), and from the Gospel of Luke, the Nativity, Annunciation to the shepherds and the angels' song (Luke 2:1–14). Typical for Bach's chorale cantata cycle, an unknown librettist retained the first and the last stanza unchanged, but paraphrased the ideas of the inner stanzas into alternating recitatives and arias. In this cantata, the complete text of the second stanza was also retained for the first recitative but expanded there line by line with new text.

Bach led the Thomanerchor in the first performance of the cantata on 25 December 1724. He performed the cantata again four more times on 25 December, in 1731, in 1732 or 1733, and twice in the 1740s, even after his Christmas Oratorio had been first performed in 1734 for which he also used two stanzas of the same chorale.

== Music ==
=== Structure and scoring ===
Bach structured Gelobet seist du, Jesu Christ in six movements. Both text and tune of the hymn are retained in the outer movements, a chorale fantasia and a four-part closing chorale. Bach scored the work for four vocal soloists (soprano (S), alto (A), tenor (T) and bass (B)), a four-part choir, and a Baroque instrumental ensemble of two horns (Co), timpani (Ti), three oboes (Ob), two violin parts (Vl), a viola part (Va) and basso continuo. The duration of the cantata is given as 20 minutes. Bach would later use the pair of horns in Part IV of his Christmas Oratorio.

In the following table of the movements, the scoring, keys and time signatures are taken from Alfred Dürr's standard work Die Kantaten von Johann Sebastian Bach. The continuo, which plays throughout, is not shown.

Movements of Gelobet seist du, Jesu Christ
No.	Title	Text	Type	Vocal	Winds	Strings	Key	Time
1	Gelobet seist du, Jesu Christ	Luther	Chorale fantasia	SATB	2Co Ti 3Ob	2Vl Va	G major	common time
2	Der Glanz der höchsten Herrlichkeit	anon., Luther	Recitative and chorale	S				common time
3	Gott, dem der Erden Kreis zu klein	anon.	Aria	T	3Ob		C major	3/4
4	O Christenheit! Wohlan	anon.	Recitative	B		2Vl Va		common time
5	Die Armut, so Gott auf sich nimmt	anon.	Aria Duetto	S A		2Vl	E minor	common time
6	Das hat er alles uns getan	Luther	Chorale	SATB	2Co Ti 3Ob	2Vl Va	G major	common time

=== Movements ===
==== 1 ====
The opening chorus, "Gelobet seist du, Jesu Christ" (All praise to you, Lord Jesus Christ), makes use of four choirs: the voices, the horns, the oboes and the strings. The material from the ritornellos, running scales against sustained thirds in the horns, is present also in interludes between the five lines and as accompaniment for the vocal parts. The choral melody is sung by the soprano. The lower voices are set in imitation for the first and the last line, in chords for the second and fourth line, and in a combination in the central line "Von einer Jungfrau, das ist wahr" (From a virgin, this is true). John Eliot Gardiner, who conducted the Bach Cantata Pilgrimage in 2000, noted the 17th-century roots of the movement.

==== 2 ====
A recitative for soprano, "Der Glanz der höchsten Herrlichkeit" (The radiance of the highest glory), prepares each line of the chorale stanza with contemporary lines. While the new text is set as secco recitative, the chorale lines use the chorale tune, accompanied by a repetition of the first line of the chorale in double tempo.

==== 3 ====
The tenor aria, "Gott, dem der Erden Kreis zu klein" (God, for whom the orb of the earth is too small), is accompanied by three oboes.

==== 4 ====
In a recitative for bass, "O Christenheit! Wohlan, so mache die bereit" (O Christianity! Now then, make yourself ready), the strings illuminate the voice. It is a slow accompagnato that depicts the "vale of tears" with an ascending chromatic line in the bass voice.

==== 5 ====
The last aria, "Die Armut, so Gott auf sich nimmt" (The poverty that God takes upon himself), is a duet for soprano and alto, contrasting "Armut" (poverty) and "Überfluss" (abundance), "Menschlich Wesen" (human being), rendered in ascending chromatic lines, and "Engelsherrlichkeiten" (angelic splendours), shown in coloraturas and triadic melodies. The violins in unison play a dotted motif. Bach reworked the cantata in the 1730s and then added "lilting syncopations" to the voices, illustrating people trying to sing like angels.

==== 6 ====
At times the horns have independent parts in the closing chorale, "Das hat er alles uns getan" (He has done all this for us); they especially embellish the final Kyrieleis to what Gardiner called "a rousing two-bar cadence".

== Manuscripts and publication ==
The first set of parts belongs to the Bach Archive. The cantata was first published in 1875 in the first complete edition of Bach's work, the Bach-Gesellschaft Ausgabe. The volume in question was edited by Thomaskantor Wilhelm Rust. In the Neue Bach-Ausgabe it was published in 1957, edited by Alfred Dürr, with a critical report the same year.

== Recordings ==
A list of recordings is provided on the Bach Cantatas Website. Ensembles playing period instruments in historically informed performances are shown with a green background.

Recordings of Gelobet seist du, Jesu Christ
Title	Conductor / Choir / Orchestra	Soloists	Label	Year	Orch. type
J. S. Bach: Das Kantatenwerk • Complete Cantatas • Les Cantates, Folge / Vol. 5	Gustav Leonhardt: Knabenchor Hannover; Collegium Vocale Gent; Concentus Musicus Wien	soloist of the Knabenchor Hannover; Paul Esswood; Kurt Equiluz; Max van Egmond	Teldec	1979	Period
Die Bach Kantate Vol. 47	Helmuth Rilling Gächinger Kantorei: Bach-Collegium Stuttgart; Württemberg Chamber Orchestra Heilbronn	Helen Donath; Helen Watts; Adalbert Kraus; Wolfgang Schöne	Hänssler	1984	
J. S. Bach: Complete Cantatas Vol. 20	Ton Koopman Amsterdam Baroque Orchestra & Choir	Lisa Larsson; Annette Markert; Christoph Prégardien; Klaus Mertens	Antoine Marchand	2000	Period
Bach Edition Vol. 14 – Cantatas Vol. 7	Pieter Jan Leusink Holland Boys Choir Netherlands Bach Collegium	Ruth Holton; Sytse Buwalda; Nico van der Meel; Bas Ramselaar	Brilliant Classics	2000	Period
Bach Cantatas Vol. 14: New York	John Eliot Gardiner Monteverdi Choir English Baroque Soloists	Katharine Fuge; Robin Tyson; James Gilchrist; Peter Harvey	Soli Deo Gloria	2000	Period
J. S. Bach: Christmas Cantatas from Leipzig	Philippe Herreweghe Collegium Vocale Gent	Dorothee Mields; Ingeborg Danz; Mark Padmore; Peter Kooy	Harmonia Mundi Franc	2014	Period
J. S. Bach: Cantatas Vol. 31 Cantatas from Leipzig 1724 – BWV 10, 93, 107, 178	Masaaki Suzuki Bach Collegium Japan	Yukari Nonoshita; Robin Blaze; Gerd Türk; Peter Kooy	BIS	2004	Period
J. S. Bach: Cantatas Vol. 31 Cantatas from Leipzig 1724 – BWV 10, 93, 107, 178	Rudolf Lutz Choir & orchestra of the J. S. Bach-Stiftung	Monika Mauch; Margot Oitzinger; Bernhard Berchtold; Peter Kooy	J. S. Bach-Stiftung	2016	Period
