= Gelobet seist du, Jesu Christ =

Lutheran hymn

- Hymn by Martin Luther
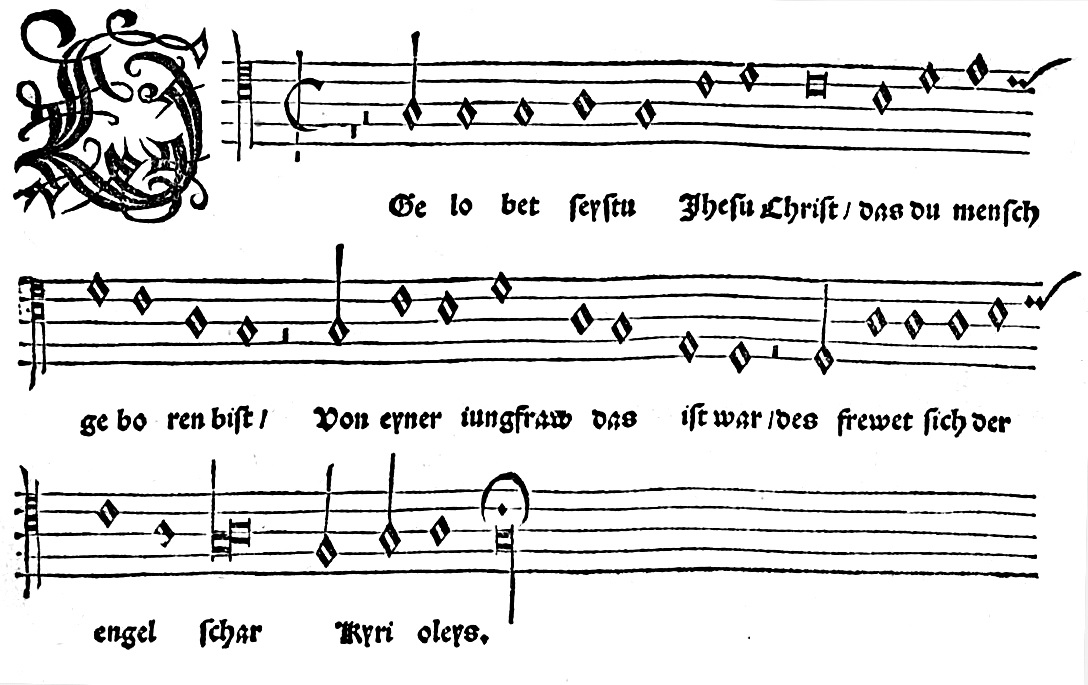
- "Gelobet seystu Jhesu Christ" in Walter's Eyn geystlich Gesangk Buchleyn
- English: Praise be to You, Jesus Christ
- Catalogue: Zahn 1947
- Text: by Martin Luther
- Language: German
- Published: 1524
- Church organ recording

"Gelobet seist du, Jesu Christ" ("Praise be to You, Jesus Christ") is a Lutheran hymn, written by Martin Luther in 1524. It was first published in 1524 in the Eyn geystlich Gesangk Buchleyn. For centuries the chorale has been the prominent hymn (Hauptlied) for Christmas Day in German speaking Lutheranism, but has also been used in different translations internationally. It has appeared in hymnals of various denominations including the Catholic Church.

== Text ==
Luther expanded a pre-Reformation stanza which is attested in Northern Germany in the 15th century, mainly in prayerbooks from the convent of Medingen, based on Grates nunc omnes, the Latin sequence of the midnight mass for Christmas, by six stanzas. Each stanza ends on the acclamation Kyrieleis. The hymn was published in Eyn Enchiridion in Erfurt in 1524.

== Tune ==
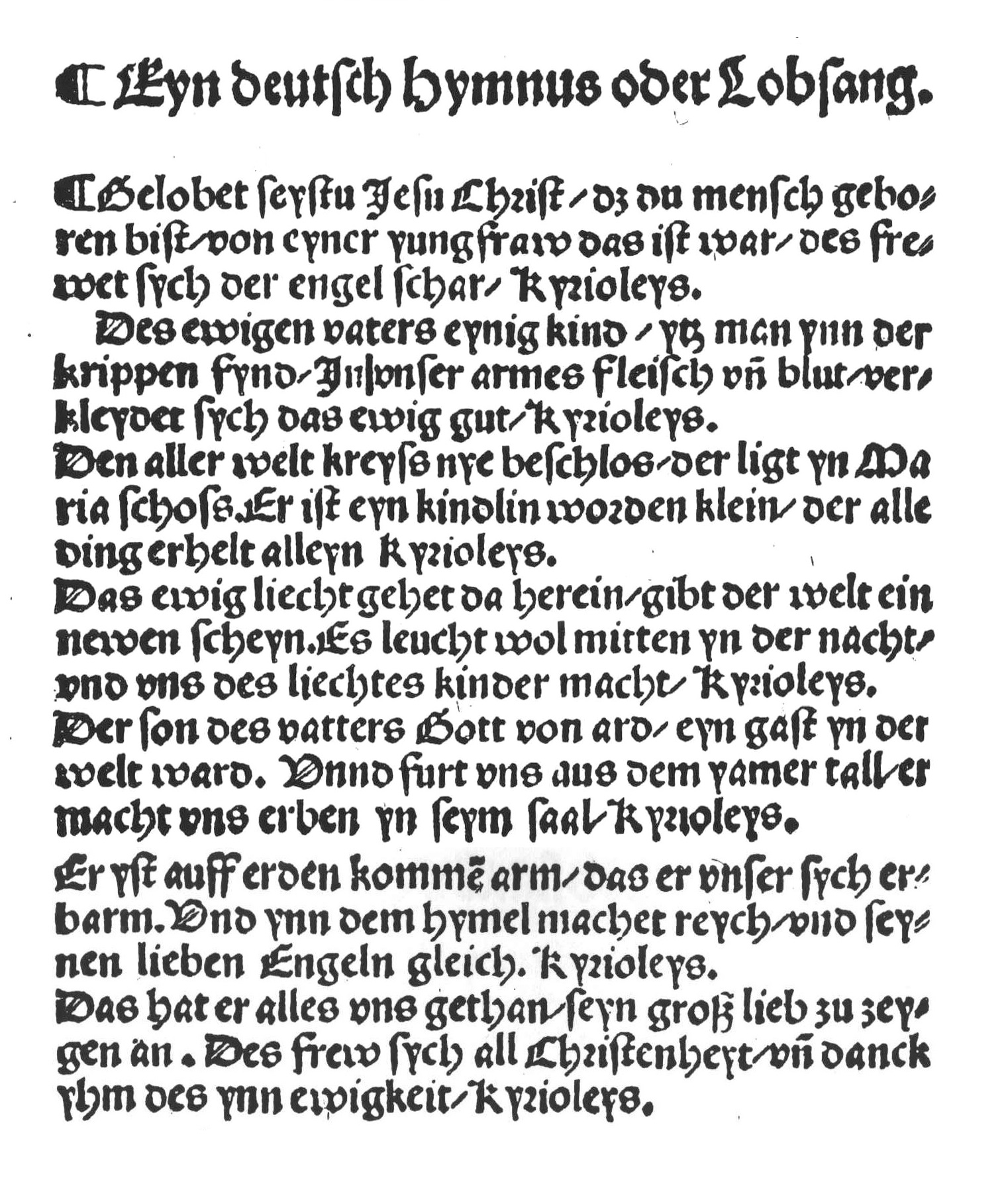
"Gelobet seystu Jesu Christ" in the Erfurt Enchiridion (1524)

The hymn tune (Zahn No. 1947) was first printed in Eyn geystlich Gesangk Buchleyn, a booklet of spiritual song, collected by Johann Walter but is attested also in the prayerbooks from the convent of Medingen and even appears on an antependium made by the nuns in the late 15th century. It seems likely that both Luther and Walter collaborated to modify an older melody.

== Musical settings ==
Balthasar Resinarius's chorale motet based on "Gelobet seist du, Jesu Christ" was printed in 1544. A setting of the hymn by Walter is dated 1551, Antonio Scandello's 1575. Lucas Osiander wrote a four-part setting in 1586, Erhard Bodenschatz in 1608, Samuel Scheidt wrote two settings in 1650. A five-part motet of Johannes Eccard was printed in 1597, one of Adam Gumpelzhaimer in Augsburg in 1618, Andreas Raselius wrote a five-part setting in 1610. Melchior Schärer (1570–1602) set the hymn as a motet a cappella for three parts, and Michael Praetorius composed various settings. Johann Hermann Schein wrote a cantata for three parts in 1618, Johann Crüger set it for four voices, two obbligato instruments (violins) and continuo.

The hymn appears in several of Johann Sebastian Bach's Christmas cantatas. He inserted its seventh stanza in one of his church cantatas, Sehet, welch eine Liebe hat uns der Vater erzeiget, BWV 64, written for the Third Day of Christmas 1723. He used the complete chorale as the base for one of his chorale cantatas, Gelobet seist du, Jesu Christ, BWV 91, composed in Leipzig for Christmas Day of 1724, setting the final stanza four voices with horns and timpani.

Bach included the sixth and seventh stanzas of the hymn respectively in the first and third cantatas of his Christmas Oratorio (1734). BWV 314, one of his four-part chorale settings of the hymn tune, in D major, and appearing in the c. 1735 Dietel manuscript, was likely also written as part of a Christmas cantata.

Gottfried Heinrich Stölzel used the hymn's fifth stanza in the centre of his Christmas cantata Kündlich groß ist das gottselige Geheimnis. Cantatas based on the hymn were also composed by Gottfried August Homilius, Friedrich Zelle, and Kurt Hessenberg, whose Op. 9 is a chorale cantata based on the hymn, written in 1935 for mixed chorus, two solo voices, organ and orchestra.

The hymn inspired organ settings by Protestant Baroque composers such as Dieterich Buxtehude, Johann Pachelbel, Georg Böhm, Bach, Homilius, Johann Christoph Altnikol and Johann Philipp Kirnberger. It is used prominently in Felix Mendelssohn's Piano Trio No. 2 as the culminating melody of the finale. Robert Schumann used the chorale for the theme and variations in the third movement of his Violin Sonata No.2 in D minor, Op. 121, changing the meter to triple time.

== See also ==
- List of Christmas carols
