= Medingen =

Medingen may refer to:

- Medingen (Bad Bevensen), a village in Lower Saxony, Germany
- Medingen, Luxembourg, a village in southern Luxembourg

== See also ==
- Medingen Abbey, a former nunnery in Medingen, Germany
