= Brunckhorst =

Brunckhorst is a surname. Notable people with the surname include:

- Arnold Matthias Brunckhorst (1670–1725), German organist and composer
- Natja Brunckhorst (born 1966), German actress and screenwriter
- Svenja Brunckhorst (born 1991), German basketball player
