= Berthold Possemeyer =

German baritone (born 1951)

- Born: Berthold Klemens Possemeyer; 20 May 1951 (age 75); Gladbeck, German
- Education: Hochschule für Musik und Tanz Köln
- Occupations: Classical baritone; Academic voice teacher

Berthold Klemens Possemeyer (born 20 May 1951) is a German baritone in opera and concert, and a voice teacher at the University of Music and Performing Arts in Frankfurt am Main.

== Career ==
Possemeyer was born in Gladbeck the son of a master baker. After graduating from the Bottrop gymnasium (today's Heinrich Heine Gymnasium), he studied education and church music, conducting and musicology, as well as singing at the Musikhochschule Köln with Franz Müller-Heuser and Josef Metternich. He has won prizes in singing competitions in Berlin, 's-Hertogenbosch and the International Bach Competition in Leipzig. He also received in 1981 a prize of North Rhine-Westphalia for young artists (de). This was followed by master classes and private studies with Elisabeth Schwarzkopf.

Possemeyer's debut as a singer was Papageno in Mozart's Die Zauberflöte at the Staatstheater Oldenburg. Later he worked with such orchestras as the Berlin Philharmonic, the Radio Symphony Orchestras Frankfurt and Stuttgart, the San Francisco Symphony Orchestra, the St. Petersburg Philharmonic and the Academy of Ancient Music in London with conductors such as Herbert Blomstedt, Christopher Hogwood, Neville Marriner, Yehudi Menuhin and Krzysztof Penderecki. In 1998 he was a soloist at the Mainz Cathedral in the premiere of Volker David Kirchner's Passion music Aus den 53 Tagen with the Mainzer Domchor, conducted by Mathias Breitschaft, as part of the 93. Deutscher Katholikentag. He performed the part of Elijah in Mendelssohn's oratorio in the Marktkirche, Wiesbaden, with the Schiersteiner Kantorei, conducted by Martin Lutz.

Since 1988, Possemeyer has taught at the University of Music and Performing Arts in Frankfurt am Main, since 1990 as a professor. Until 2003, he took over the singing training of choir directors, voice teachers, church musicians and school musicians. From 2003, he has been training singers for opera and oratorio. Among his students are Sabine Fischmann, Markus Flaig, and Georg Poplutz.

== Musical comedy ==
Possemeyer has performed in collaboration with actor Till Krabbe and others in the field of musical comedy. They appeared for the Rheingau Musik Festival, but also in charity events. In 2007 they performed with singer Sabine Fischmann and pianist Marcus Neumeyer the chamber musical Die fromme Helene based on Wilhelm Busch. Called "Holzhausen‑Quartett", they staged in 2011 at the Holzhausenschlösschen the chamber musical "Ein Sommernachtstraum" Durchtriebenes Kammermusical nach William Shakespeare, playing all 26 parts of Shakespeare's A Midsummer Night's Dream in a parody, including songs of Shakespeare's time by John Dowland, Gerald Finzi and Thomas Morley. In 2012, they performed Und wenn sie nicht gestorben sind ... – alle Märchen der Brüder Grimm in einem Kammermusical ("And if They Haven't Died Yet ..., a Chamber Musical of all of Grimms' Fairy Tales"), with songs by Schubert, Schumann and Brahms. The program was performed in Frankfurt at the Goethe House and in Wiesbaden as a charity event for the africa action (de).

== Recording ==
In 1977, Possemeyer performed in a recording of Marco da Gagliano's La Dafne, with Barbara Schlick, Ian Partridge and others, of the Monteverdi-Chor and Camerata Accademica, conducted by Jürgen Jürgens. In 1990, he sang the bass part in a recording of Handel's Utrecht Te Deum and Jubilate with the Münchner Mottenchor and the Münchner Philharmoniker, conducted by Hans Rudolf Zöbeley. He participated in a recording of the Carus-Verlag of the complete sacred choral music by Felix Mendelssohn, performing the Christmas cantata Vom Himmel hoch (From Heaven above) for soprano and baritone soloists, SSATB choir and orchestra (1831). A review noted: "In his short devout aria Es ist der Herr Christ, unser Gott the German baritone Berthold Possemeyer sensitively conveys appropriately restrained expression. Especially affecting are his closing lines Er bringt euch alle Seligkeit .... Possemeyer is elegantly toned in his brief arioso Das also hat gefallen dir".

In 2003, he performed the words of Jesus in Georg Philipp Telemann's Passion oratorio Das selige Erwägen des bittern Leiden und Sterbens Jesu Christi (The blessed contemplation of the bitter suffering and dying of Jesus Christ) with the Freiburger Vokalensemble and the orchestra L'arpa festante, conducted by Wolfgang Schäfer.
