= Vom Himmel hoch, da komm ich her =

Christmas song

- Hymn by Martin Luther
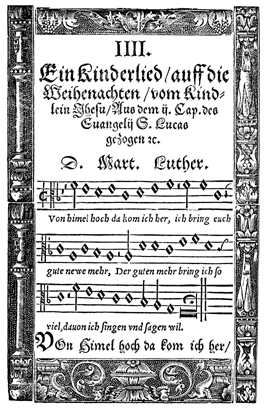
- 1567 publication
- English: From Heaven Above to Earth I Come
- Catalogue: Zahn 345–346
- Genre: Hymn; Christmas carol
- Written: 1534
- Text: by Martin Luther
- Language: German
- Meter: 8.8.8.8
- Melody: of a secular song (1535); probably by Martin Luther (1539)
- Published: 1535

"Vom Himmel hoch, da komm ich her" ("From Heaven Above to Earth I Come") is a hymn text relating to the Nativity of Jesus, written by Martin Luther in 1534. The hymn is most often sung to the melody, Zahn No. 346, which first appeared in a 1539 songbook and was probably also composed by Luther. This classic Christmas carol remains popular and has inspired many choral and organ works by other composers.

== History ==
In an account not confirmed by contemporary sources Martin Luther would have written "Vom Himmel hoch" in 1534 for the Christmas celebration in family circle. It is not certain but likely that Luther thought of a scenic representation. The text of the hymn was first published in 1535, the melody most commonly associated with it in 1539.

=== 1535 publication ===
"Vom Himmel hoch" was first published in 1535 as a hymn with 15 stanzas of four lines in Geistliche Lieder auffs new gebessert (also known as the Klugsches Gesangbuch), under the header "Ein kinderlied auff die Weinacht Christi" ("A children's song on the Nativity of Christ"). In that publication, the text was coupled to the melody of the then well-known secular song "Ich kumm aus frembden Landen her," Zahn 345. It was Luther's only contrafactum, reusing a tune of a secular composition for a religious text.

=== 1539 melody ===
In 1539, the hymn was published with a new melody, Zahn 346, that was probably composed by Luther himself, in Geistliche lieder auffs new gebessert und gemehrt (an edition of the Klugsches Gesangbuch). This is the melody generally associated with the text:

== Text ==
The song is an interpretation of Luke 2:8–18, a part of the Christmas story. The first five stanzas echo the annunciation addressed to the shepherds. The following stanzas are an invitation to follow the shepherds to the manger and celebrate the newborn baby. The last stanza is a short doxology and mentions the new year, as a new, peaceful time.

1. Vom Himmel hoch, da komm ich her.
Ich bring' euch gute neue Mär,
Der guten Mär bring ich so viel,
Davon ich sing'n und sagen will.

2. Euch ist ein Kindlein heut' geborn
Von einer Jungfrau auserkorn,
Ein Kindelein, so zart und fein,
Das soll eu'r Freud und Wonne sein.

3. Es ist der Herr Christ, unser Gott,
Der will euch führn aus aller Not,
Er will eu'r Heiland selber sein,
Von allen Sünden machen rein.

4. Er bringt euch alle Seligkeit,
Die Gott der Vater hat bereit,
Daß ihr mit uns im Himmelreich
Sollt leben nun und ewiglich.

5. So merket nun das Zeichen recht:
Die Krippe, Windelein so schlecht,
Da findet ihr das Kind gelegt,
Das alle Welt erhält und trägt.

6. Des laßt uns alle fröhlich sein
Und mit den Hirten gehn hinein,
Zu sehn, was Gott uns hat beschert,
Mit seinem lieben Sohn verehrt.

7. Merk auf, mein Herz, und sieh dorthin!
Was liegt dort in dem Krippelein?
Wes ist das schöne Kindelein?
Es ist das liebe Jesulein.

8. Sei mir willkommen, edler Gast!
Den Sünder nicht verschmähet hast
Und kommst ins Elend her zu mir,
Wie soll ich immer danken dir?

9. Ach, Herr, du Schöpfer aller Ding,
Wie bist du worden so gering,
Daß du da liegst auf dürrem Gras,
Davon ein Rind und Esel aß!

10. Und wär' die Welt vielmal so weit,
Von Edelstein und Gold bereit',
So wär sie doch dir viel zu klein,
Zu sein ein enges Wiegelein.

11. Der Sammet und die Seide dein,
Das ist grob Heu und Windelein,
Darauf du König groß und reich
Herprangst, als wär's dein Himmelreich.

12. Das hat also gefallen dir,
Die Wahrheit anzuzeigen mir:
Wie aller Welt Macht, Ehr und Gut
Vor dir nichts gilt, nichts hilft noch tut.

13. Ach, mein herzliebes Jesulein,
Mach dir ein rein, sanft Bettelein,
Zu ruhen in meins Herzens Schrein,
Das ich nimmer vergesse dein.

14. Davon ich allzeit fröhlich sei,
Zu springen, singen immer frei
Das rechte Susaninne schon,
Mit Herzenslust den süßen Ton.

15. Lob, Ehr sei Gott im höchsten Thron,
Der uns schenkt seinen ein'gen Sohn.
Des freuen sich der Engel Schar
Und singen uns solch neues Jahr.

From heaven above to earth I come
To bear good news to every home;
Glad tidings of great joy I bring
Whereof I now will say and sing:

To you this night is born a child
Of Mary, chosen mother mild;
This little child, of lowly birth,
Shall be the joy of all your earth.

'Tis Christ our God who far on high
Hath heard your sad and bitter cry;
Himself will your Salvation be,
Himself from sin will make you free.

He brings those blessings, long ago
Prepared by God for all below;
Henceforth His kingdom open stands
To you, as to the angel bands.

These are the tokens ye shall mark,
The swaddling clothes and manger dark;
There shall ye find the young child laid,
By whom the heavens and earth were made.

Now let us all with gladsome cheer
Follow the shepherds, and draw near
To see this wondrous gift of God
Who hath His only Son bestowed.

Give heed, my heart, lift up thine eyes!
Who is it in yon manger lies?
Who is this child so young and fair?
The blessed Christ-child lieth there.

Welcome to earth, Thou noble guest,
Through whom e'en wicked men are blest!
Thou com'st to share our misery,
What can we render, Lord, to Thee!

Ah, Lord, who hast created all,
How hast Thou made Thee weak and small,
That Thou must choose Thy infant bed
Where ass and ox but lately fed!

Were earth a thousand times as fair,
Beset with gold and jewels rare,
She yet were far too poor to be
A narrow cradle, Lord, for Thee.

For velvets soft and silken stuff
Thou hast but hay and straw so rough,
Whereon Thou King, so rich and great,
As 'twere Thy heaven, art throned in state.

Thus hath it pleased Thee to make plain
The truth to us poor fools and vain,
That this world's honour, wealth and might
Are nought and worthless in Thy sight.

Ah! dearest Jesus, Holy Child,
Make Thee a bed, soft, undefiled,
Within my heart, that it may be
A quiet chamber kept for Thee.

My heart for very joy doth leap,
My lips no more can silence keep;
I too must sing with joyful tongue
That sweetest ancient cradle-song.

Glory to God in highest heaven,
Who unto man His Son hath given!
While angels sing with pious mirth
A glad New Year to all the earth.

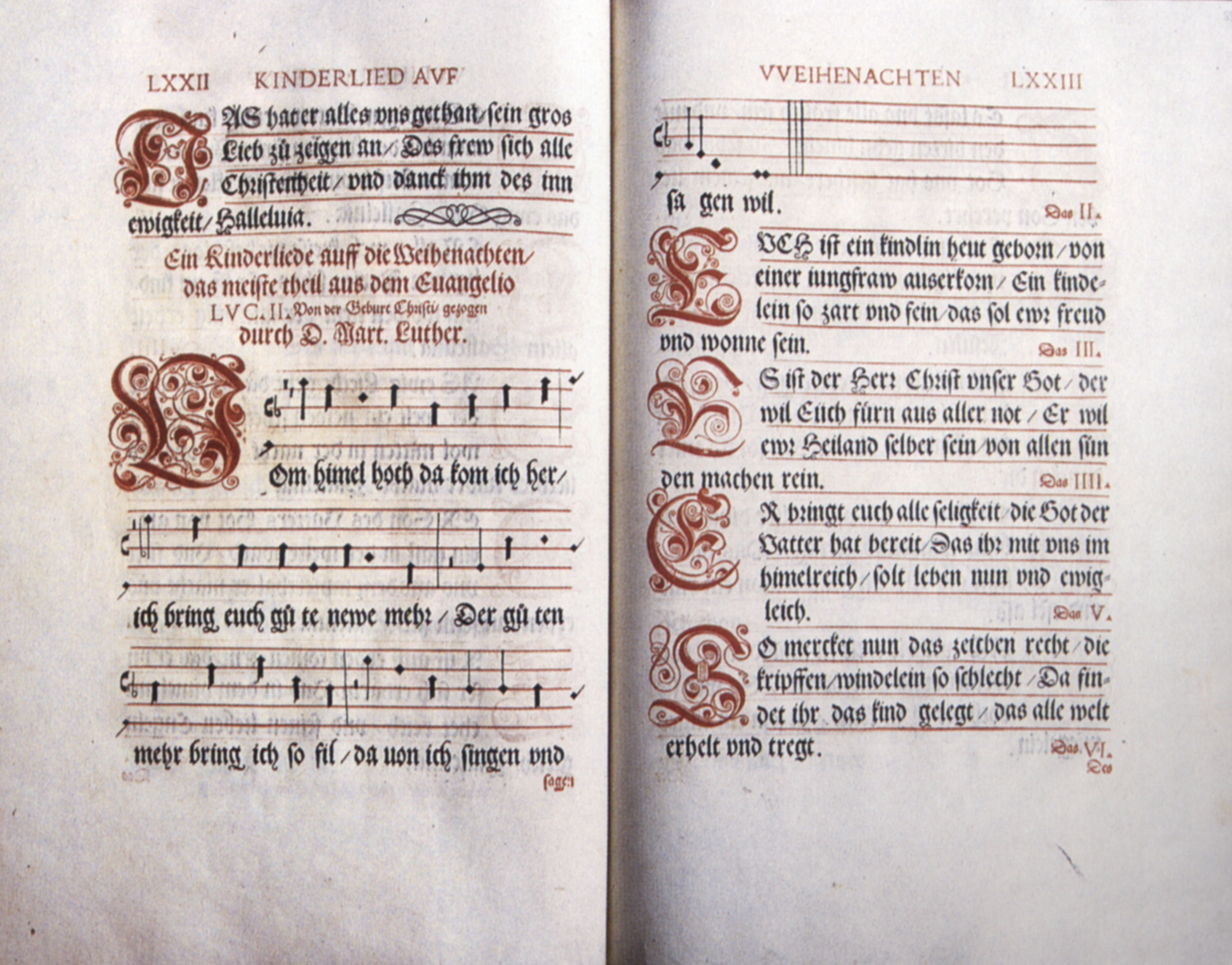
1539 melody and first five stanzas in the Straßburger Gesangbuch (1541)

== Reception history ==
Another early publication containing the 1539 version of Luther's hymn is Lotther's Magdeburg Gesangbuch of 1540. The 1539 melody was used in various compositions, in vocal compositions often coupled to (parts of) Luther's hymn text. "Vom Himmel hoch, da komm ich her" became one of Germany's most popular Christmas carols.

In the 1560s the hymn spread to the Netherlands and the British Isles. "From Heaven Above to Earth I Come," the version best known in English, was published by Catherine Winkworth in 1855. The Swedish-language version ("Av himlens höjd oss kommet är") became one of the most commonly sung Lutheran hymns in Sweden and Finland, appearing in films there.

Not all settings of Luther's hymn text after his publication of the 1539 melody refer to that melody: for instance Sethus Calvisius' early seventeenth century motet Vom Himmel hoch, da komm ich her for SSATTB choir borrows some motifs from the "Ich kumm aus frembden Landen her" melody, but does not contain the 1539 tune. The Scottish translation contained in the sixteenth century Gude and Godlie Ballatis was indicated to be sung on the tune of a lullaby ("Balulalow").

=== 1539 melody in other compositions ===
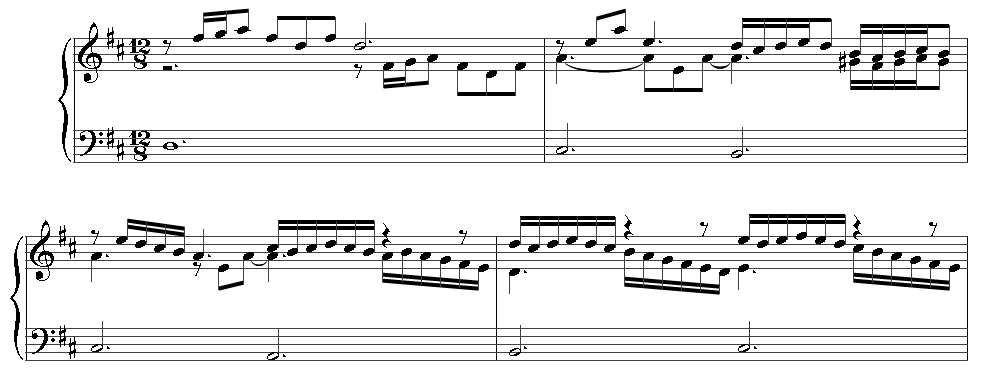
Chorale prelude No. 8 in Johann Pachelbel's Erster Theil etlicher Choräle (the "Vom Himmel hoch, da komm' ich her" melody appears as a cantus firmus in the bass)

From the second half of the 16th century the melody appeared in organ compositions, for instance by Johannes Eccard, Adam Gumpelzhaimer, Hans Leo Hassler, Michael Praetorius, Samuel Scheidt (Görlitzer Tabulaturbuch, 1650) and Heinrich Scheidemann. Early 17th century four-part chorale harmonizations include those by Jacob Praetorius, Hassler and Calvisius. Later organ compositions include those by Johann Pachelbel (chorale preludes, one of them printed in his Erster Theil etlicher Choräle c. 1693) and by Georg Böhm ("Vom Himmel hoch, da komm ich her").

Johann Hermann Schein made a setting of "Vom Himmel hoch da komm ich her" for three voices and continuo, the unaltered 1539 melody being given to the tenor voice. Sebastian Knüpfer wrote a cantata Vom Himmel hoch da komm' ich her for six vocal soloists, choir and orchestra. Johann Christoph Bach set six stanzas of "Vom Himmel hoch" in his motet Merk auf, mein Herz und sieh dorthin, BWV Anh. 163. Also Johann Mattheson included "Vom Himmel hoch" in his Christmas Oratorio Die heilsame Geburt und Menschwerdung unsers Herrn und Heilandes Jesu Christi (1715).

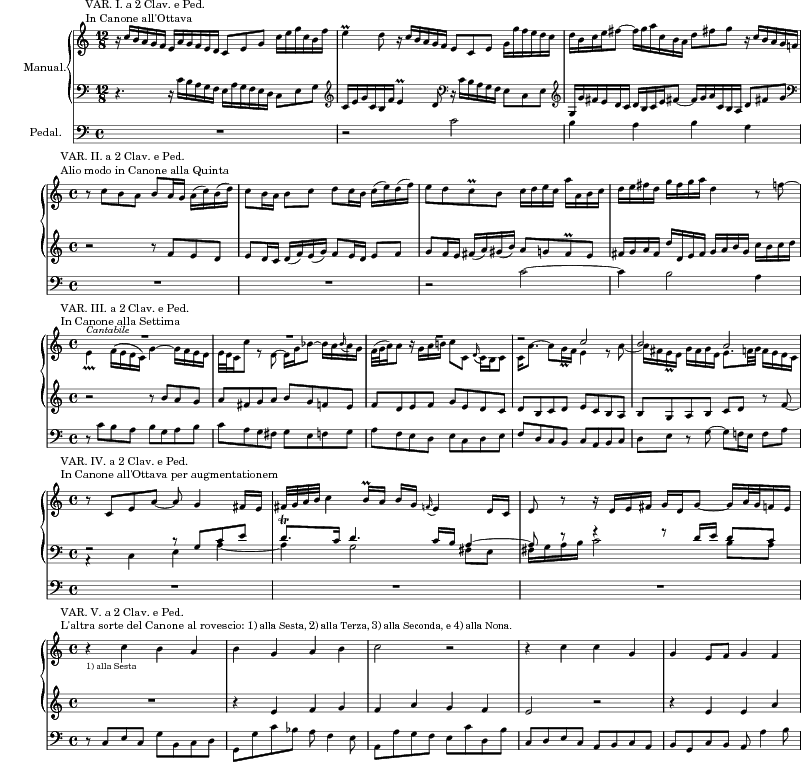
Incipits of Bach's five variations on "Vom Himmel hoch da komm ich her", BWV 769, the theme appearing, for instance, as a cantus firmus for pedal in the first variation

Johann Sebastian Bach set the first stanza of "Vom Himmel hoch" as one of four laudes added to the Christmas 1723 version of his Magnificat. He also used the melody three times in his Christmas Oratorio (1734). The chorale Ach, mein herzliebes Jesulein, which uses stanza 13 of Luther's hymn, closes Part I of the oratorio. Bach wrote chorale preludes based on "Vom Himmel hoch", notably BWV 606 in his Orgelbüchlein, 700, 701, 738 and 738a. In 1747 he used the chorale theme for his Canonic Variations on "Vom Himmel hoch da komm' ich her" (BWV 769).

In 1831 Felix Mendelssohn wrote a chorale cantata Vom Himmel hoch, MWV A 10, based on Luther's hymn. Later he incorporated the melody in the incidental music for Racine's Athalie, Op. 74 (1845), and his sister Fanny cited it in the "December" piece of her piano cycle Das Jahr. Also Otto Nicolai's Christmas Overture was based on "Vom Himmel hoch."

A 1910 Fugue on the chorale "Vom Himmel hoch da komm ich her" is by Immanuel Faisst. Other composers citing "Vom Himmel hoch" include Sigfrid Karg-Elert, Ernst Pepping und Hugo Distler. Max Reger composed a chorale prelude as No. 40 of his 52 Chorale Preludes, Op. 67 in 1902. He quotes the tune in the Christmas section of his organ pieces Sieben Stücke, Op. 145. Igor Stravinsky wrote "Chorale Variations on 'Vom Himmel hoch'" for choir and orchestra (1956), which was an arrangement of Bach's canonic variations, adding extra contrapuntal lines.

"Enkeli taivaan", the Finnish version of "Vom Himmel Hoch", appears in Act 2, scene five of Luther, an opera by Kari Tikka that premiered in 2000. The English-language version of the opera, brought to the United States in 2001, contains seven stanzas of "From heav´n above to earth I come." The opera premiered in Germany in 2004 containing stanzas of "Vom Himmel hoch" in the original language.

=== "Es kam ein Engel hell und klar" ===
Valentin Triller, a Protestant vicar, published a reworked version of the hymn with an additional introductory stanza in 1555, reverting to the "Ich kumm aus frembden Landen her" melody. This version, known by its new first line, "Es kam ein Engel hell und klar", found its way to Catholic songbooks in the 16th century, although such printings of the song would not always contain all eighteen stanzas of Triller's version and would also start to adopt Luther's 1539 singing tune again.

=== "Balulalow" ===
The 1567 second edition of The Gude and Godlie Ballatis (the good and godly ballads) contained a Scottish translation of "Vom Himmel hoch, da komm ich her" under the header "Followis ane sang of the birth of Christ, with the tune of Baw lula low" (Here follows a song of the birth of Christ, [to be sung] on the tune of Balulalow). The first line of this translation reads "I come from heuin to tell" (I come from heaven to tell).

The thirteenth and fourteenth stanza of this were considered a Scottish lullaby, "Oh, my deir hert, young Jesus sweit" (Oh, my dear heart, young Jesus sweet). As "Balulalow" these two stanzas were set to music for instance by Benjamin Britten as No. 4b in A Ceremony of Carols, Op. 28 (1942). Peter Warlock had already set the same lyrics in 1919.

Popular interpretations followed, for instance by Loreena McKennitt (To Drive the Cold Winter Away, 1987), by Sting (If on a Winter's Night..., 2009), and by the French band Revolver.

=== "From Heaven on High the Angels Sing" ===
"From Heaven on High the Angels Sing" is sometimes indicated as a translation of "Vom Himmel hoch, da komm ich her." It is however a translation of "Vom Himmel hoch, o Engel, kommt", a song also known as "Susani", first published in the early 17th century, with a different tune. Apart from the Christmas setting derived from Luke 2:1–18, the "Susani" repeated in this song also likens it to the "Susaninne" of the fourteenth stanza of "Vom Himmel hoch, da komm ich her." There are however many other hymns, including older and English ones, with similar likenesses, e.g. the fourteenth century "A Little Child There Is Ybore", "A Little Child There Is Yborn", "Gloria Tibi Domine", and Luther's 1543 "Vom Himmel kam der Engel Schar". The last one is usually sung to the "Vom Himmel hoch" melody, or, alternatively, to the "Puer natus in Bethlehem" hymn tune, Zahn 192a.

=== "Ett barn är fött på denna dag" ===
"Ett barn är fött på denna dag" is a Swedish Christmas song partly based on the "Vom Himmel hoch" hymn.

== See also ==
- List of hymns by Martin Luther
- List of Christmas carols
