= Kündlich groß ist das gottselige Geheimnis (Stölzel) =

- Christmas cantata by Gottfried Heinrich Stölzel
- English: "Great indeed is the Godly mystery"
- Occasion: Third Day of Christmas
- Text: 1 Timothy 3:16; "Gelobet seist du, Jesu Christ"; "Kommst du nun, Jesu"
- Language: German
- Published: 1967
- Movements: five
- Scoring: soprano; alto; choir; oboe; 2 violins; viola; continuo

Kündlich groß ist das gottselige Geheimnis ("Great indeed is the Godly mystery") is a Christmas cantata by Gottfried Heinrich Stölzel, intended for the third day of Christmas, and set for soloists, choir, oboe, strings and continuo.

== History ==
Stölzel composed the cantata as part of his cycles of church cantatas for the court of Schwarzburg-Sondershausen. He composed two works beginning with a verse from the First Epistle to Timothy, "And without controversy great is the mystery of godliness: God was manifest in the flesh" (1 Timothy 3:16). It was intended for the Third Day of Christmas in 1736. For the third day, he used a modest ensemble of strings and oboe, and composed no recitatives.

== Structure and music ==
The cantata is structured in five movements, an opening choral movement, a soprano aria, a chorale, an alto aria and another chorale.

1. Kündlich groß ist das gottselige Geheimnis
2. Geheimnisvolle Worte
3. Der Sohn des Vaters, Gott von Art
4. Dies Geheimnis führt und treibt uns
5. Gib uns, o Jesu

The cantata is scored for soprano and alto soloists, a four-part choir, oboe, 2 violins, viola and continuo.

The choral movements is in two parts, the first for the announcement of the mystery mostly homophonic, the second, "Gott ist offenbaret im Fleisch", in polyphony. In a da capo aria, the soprano is accompanied by obbligato instruments oboe and violin. The centre of the cantata is the fifth stanza of Martin Luther's Christmas hymn "Gelobet seist du, Jesu Christ", "Der Sohn des Vaters, Gott von Art" (The Father's Son, of godly nature), in a four-part setting. An alto aria, "Dies Geheimnis führt und treibt" (This mystery leads and drives) is an unusual setting without continuo, while two violins play parallel thirds in dotted rhythms above the voice. The cantata is closed with the fourth stanza of another Christmas hymn, Kaspar Friedrich Nachtenhöfer's "Kommst du nun, Jesu, vom Himmel herunter auf Erden?" (Do you now come, Jesus, from Heaven down to Earth?"

The cantata is included in a collection of critical editions of Baroque music from Mitteldeutschland, edited by Hans-Joachim Schulze and printed by Hofmeister in 2006.

== Recording ==
It was recorded in 2016 as part of an album Jauchze du Tochter Zion of Christmas cantatas by Christoph Förster, Gottfried August Homilius, Johann Heinrich Rolle, Stölzel and other, with the Kölner Akademie conducted by Michael Alexander Willens, and soloists Hanna Herfurtner and Carola Günther.
