= Johann Samuel Beyer =

German composer and writer

Johann Samuel Beyer (1669 in Gotha – 9 May 1744 in Karlsbad) was a German composer and writer of a manual on singing (1703).

== Works, editions, recordings ==
His works are available in a modern edition and include a Christmas cantata entitled Heilig ist Gott.
