= Vom Himmel hoch (Mendelssohn) =

Chorale cantata by Felix Mendelssohn

- Chorale cantata by Felix Mendelssohn
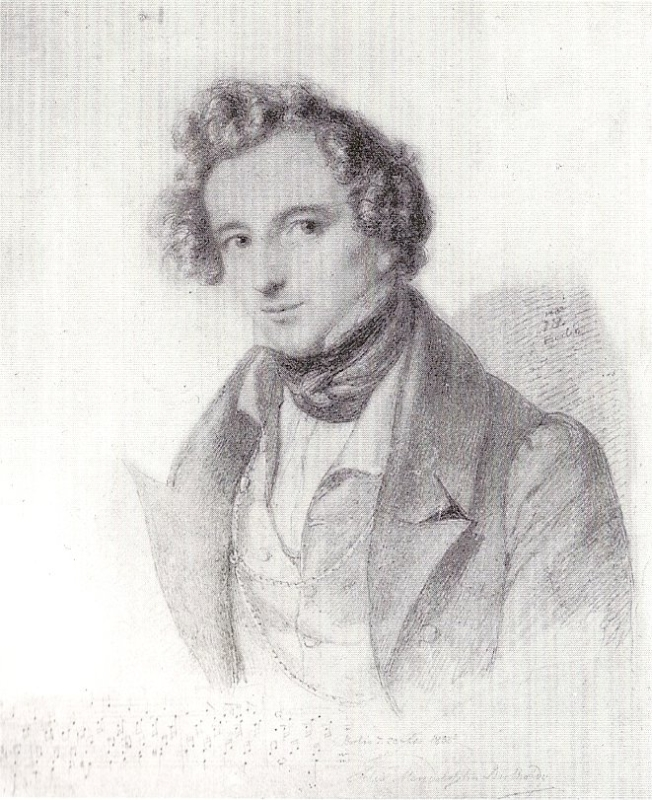
- The composer in 1833, drawing by Eduard Bendemann
- Catalogue: MWV A 10
- Occasion: Christmas
- Text: "Vom Himmel hoch, da komm ich her"
- Language: German
- Composed: 1831
- Published: 1983
- Duration: 16 minutes
- Scoring: soprano; baritone; SSATB choir; orchestra

Vom Himmel hoch, MWV A 10, is a Christmas cantata by Felix Mendelssohn. He composed the chorale cantata, based on Luther's hymn "Vom Himmel hoch, da komm ich her", in 1831, setting selected stanzas with unchanged lyrics for soprano and baritone soloists, a five-part mixed choir (SSATB), and orchestra. The cantata was first published by Carus-Verlag in 1983, with an English version From heav'n on high.

== Background and history ==
Mendelssohn had been introduced to the art of chorale arrangement when studying with Carl Friedrich Zelter, especially focused on the works by Johann Sebastian Bach. In 1829, he conducted Bach's St Matthew Passion on the occasion of its centenary. He composed eight chorale cantatas between 1827 and 1832, following the model of Bach's chorale cantatas in "fluent understanding of Baroque forms and styles", but also adding elements of the Romantic period.

He composed the chorale cantata Vom Himmel hoch in 1831 in Rome on an extended trip to Italy. His friend Franz Krause had provided him with a booklet of hymns by Luther for this trip. It included the hymn for Christmas, "Vom Himmel hoch, da komm ich her", that Luther wrote in 1534 for use in his family, possibly intended to be performed as a nativity play it was published in 1535 with a secular melody and in 1539 with a melody by Luther. In a letter from Milan, Mendelsohn reported his intention to compose a lot. He wrote the chorale cantata in 1831 in Rome, staying in a monastery where Luther had also resided on a trip. In a letter from Rome to his friend Karl Klingemann he noted that Luther's text calls for music, with every stanza a new piece, with progress, movement and growth ("Wie da jedes Wort nach Musik ruft, wie jede Strophe ein anderes Stück ist, wie überall ein Fortschritt, eine Bewegung, ein Wachsen ...").

Mendelssohn's autograph manuscript of the score is held by the Berlin State Library. The manuscript shows signs of wear, and is numbered as if prepared for publication, but wasn't printed during the composer's lifetime. The cantata was first published by Carus-Verlag in 1983, with an English version From heav'n on high.

== Structure and music ==
The cantata is scored for soprano and baritone soloists, a five-part mixed choir (SSATB), and orchestra. The text is the unchanged hymn poetry of several stanzas of Luther's hymn. The work is structured in six movements:

1. Vom Himmel hoch, da komm ich her (From heaven above to earth I come, stanzas 1 and 2), chorus
2. Es ist der Herr Christ, unser Gott (Tis Christ our God who far on high, stanzas 3 and beginning of 4), baritone aria
3. Er bringt euch alle Seligkeit (He brings those blessings, long ago, stanza 4), chorale,
4. Sei willekomm', du edler Gast! (Welcome to earth, Thou noble guest, stanzas 8 and 10), soprano aria
5. Das also hat gefallen dir, (Thus hath it pleased Thee to make plain, stanza 12), baritone arioso
6. Lob, Ehr sei Gott im höchsten Thron (Glory to God in highest heaven, stanza 15), chorus

The cantata takes about 16 minutes to perform. It is the longest of Mendelssohn's eight chorale cantatas. The opening movement uses a virtuoso orchestra: It alternates the first stanza, set in homophony, and the second which is set in imitation. Two pensive arias and an arioso are independent of the choral melody, while the third and the finale movement use this melody that Luther also wrote in 1539. While the third movement is a simple chorale setting, the final one uses a rich orchestra.

== Recording ==
The cantata was recorded with soloists Krisztina Laki and Berthold Possemeyer, the Kammerchor Stuttgart and the Württembergisches Kammerorchester Heilbronn conducted by Frieder Bernius, as part of the recording of the complete sacred choral music by Mendelssohn by Carus-Verlag.
