= Christen, ätzet diesen Tag, BWV 63 =

Church cantata by J. S. Bach

Christen, ätzet diesen Tag
- BWV 63
- Christmas cantata by J. S. Bach
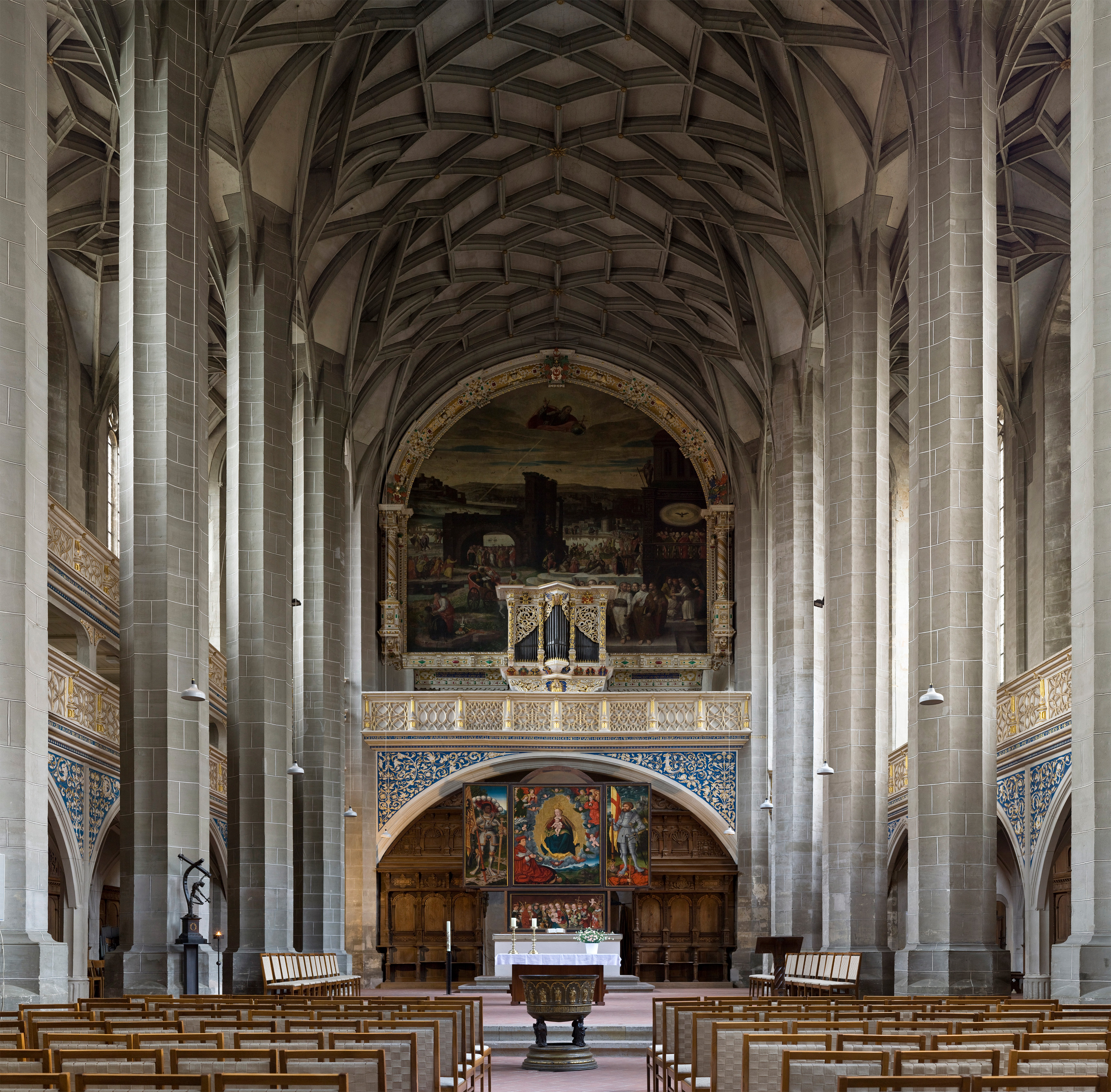
- Liebfrauenkirche, Halle
- Cantata text: Johann Michael Heineccius?
- Performed: 25 December 1713: Halle?; 25 December 1723: Leipzig
- Movements: 7
- Vocal: SATB choir and solo
- Instrumental: 4 trumpets; timpani; 3 oboes; bassoon; 2 violins; viola; continuo

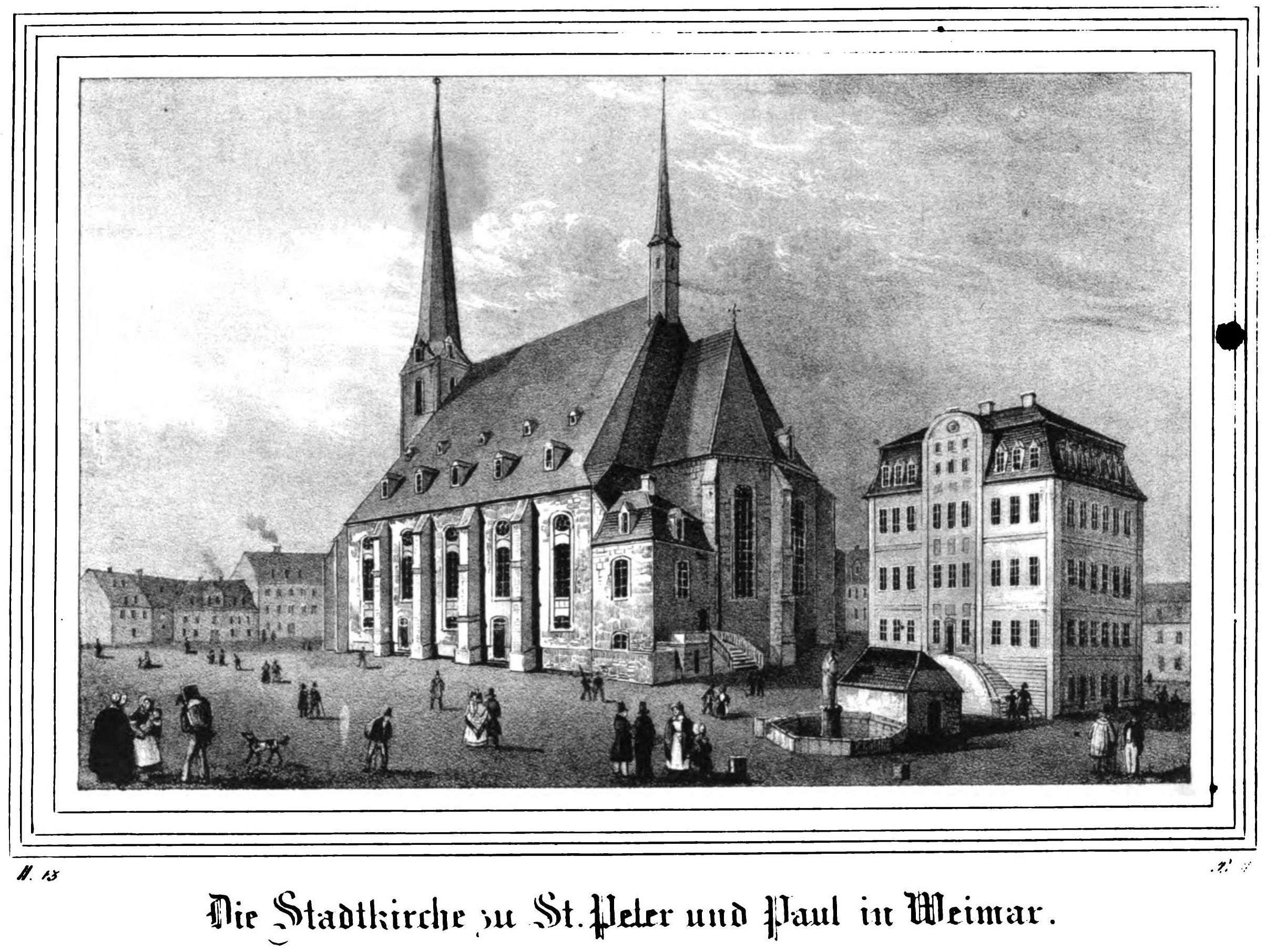
Town church St. Peter und Paul, Weimar

Christen, ätzet diesen Tag (Christians, engrave this day), BWV 63, is a church cantata by Johann Sebastian Bach. He composed the Christmas cantata for the First Day of Christmas, possibly in 1713 for the Liebfrauenkirche in Halle. He performed it again for his first Christmas as Thomaskantor in Leipzig, on 25 December 1723.

== History and words ==
The cantata is Bach's earliest extant cantata for Christmas Day, possibly composed in Weimar as early as 1713. The text of the cantata, which echoes theologians in Halle, suggests that it was composed with Halle's Liebfrauenkirche in mind, in 1713, when Bach applied to be organist of this church, or in 1716, when he was involved in rebuilding its organ. The text is possibly by that church's Pastor primarius Johann Michael Heineccius, who also wrote the libretti for other Bach cantatas definitely written for Halle and had favoured Bach's application for organist at the church as a successor to Friedrich Wilhelm Zachow. Musicologist Christoph Wolff deduces from the "lavish forces" of four trumpets, timpani and three oboes on top of the strings, an unprecedented scoring in Bach's cantatas, that the work was not composed for the intimate Schlosskapelle in Weimar. He dates it as 1714 or 1715. According to John Eliot Gardiner, the first performance may have taken place in Weimar in the church of St. Peter und Paul, performed by the combined musicians of the ducal Capelle and the town musicians.

The prescribed readings for the feast day were from the Epistle to Titus, "God's mercy appeared" (Titus 2:11–14) or from Isaiah, "Unto us a child is born" (Isaiah 9:2–7), and from the Gospel of Luke, the Nativity, Annunciation to the shepherds and the angels' song (Luke 2:1–14). The poet wrote a text centred in symmetry around a recitative, framed by two duets, two more recitatives and two equal chorus movements. The lack of a closing chorale, which closes most of Bach's later cantatas, has raised the question if the work is based on a secular cantata.

According to Gardiner, the cantata was performed again to celebrate the bicentennial of the Reformation in Halle in 1717. The musicologist Philipp Spitta assumed that the cantata was written for a 1723 premiere in Leipzig, because Bach performed it on the first day of Christmas in his first year as Thomaskantor, turning to new compositions that year only for the second and third days of Christmas, Darzu ist erschienen der Sohn Gottes, BWV 40, and Sehet, welch eine Liebe hat uns der Vater erzeiget, BWV 64. The musicologist Julian Mincham assumes that Bach chose this cantata for his first Christmas as Thomaskantor because "an inspired piece that commenced and concluded with impressive choruses, was exactly the right work for the occasion and nothing new was likely to eclipse it." It demanded the largest group of performers since Bach had begun his post half a year before, asking for four trumpets, timpani and three oboes in addition to the regular four voice parts and strings. Bach performed the cantata in Leipzig at least one more time, possibly in 1729.

== Scoring and structure ==
The cantata in seven movements is festively scored for four vocal soloists (soprano, alto, tenor, and bass), a four-part choir, four trumpets, timpani, three oboes, bassoon, two violins, viola, organ in a later version, and continuo.

1. Chorus: Christen, ätzet diesen Tag
2. Recitative (alto): Oh, selger Tag! o ungemeines Heute
3. Aria (duet soprano, bass): Gott, du hast es wohl gefüget
4. Recitative (tenor): So kehret sich nun heut
5. Aria (duet alto, tenor): Ruft und fleht den Himmel an
6. Recitative (bass): Verdoppelt euch demnach
7. Chorus: Höchster, schau in Gnaden an

== Music ==
The cantata has a festive character but lacks certain features typically associated with Christmas music, such as Pastoral music, angels' song and cradle song, even a Christmas carol or chorale, as Gardiner words it: "The cantata contains none of the usual Nativity themes: no cradle song, no music for the shepherds or for the angels, not even the standard Christmas chorales". The symmetry of the text around the tenor recitative "Nun kehret sich nun heut das bange Leid ... in lauter Heil und Gnaden" (So now, today, the anxious sorrow is changed ... into pure blessing and grace) is reflected in the music. The recitatives lean toward arioso at times, typical for Bach's music in the period. The choral movements show da capo form, but with distinctly contrasting middle sections, which relates to motet style. Wolff describes these movements as "fanfare-like frameworks", a cantabile choral setting contrasting with virtuoso orchestral playing in "secular dance".

Opening fanfare of closing chorus

Gardiner observes that the first recitative for alto, accompanied by the strings, contains "tortuous passage[s] in which voice and continuo struggle to free themselves from 'Satan's slavish chains'". The cantata contains two duets, rare in Bach's cantatas, likely an expression of communal rejoicing which is expressed better in a duet than by a single voice. The second duet is a minuet, illustrating the words "Kommt, ihr Christen, kommt zum Reihen" (Come, you Christians, come to dance). Instead of the usual closing chorale, the cantata ends with a chorus "conceived on the largest of scales", full of energy. The trumpets begin with pompous fanfares, the voices first sing a fanfare, addressing the "highest", then open a permutation fugue which is later expanded by instrumental doubling and counteraction, to express the thanks of the devout souls. The middle section is a second fugue in similar style which ends with a "preposterous collective trill" on the word "quälen" (torment), observed by Mincham as "a passage of extraordinary intensity. The tempo slows, the harmony becomes tragic and chromatic and the whole feeling is that of deepest melancholy at the very thought of Satan’s embrace". Then a da capo of the complete first section ends the cantata on "the original celebratory flourishes of the complete ritornello theme".

In one of the later performances Bach changed the obbligato oboe part in movement 3 to an organ, writing it himself in the part for the continuo organ.

== Recordings ==
- J. S. Bach: Cantata BWV 63, Michael Gielen, Wiener Kammerchor, Vienna State Opera Orchestra, Margit Opawsky, Hilde Rössel-Majdan, Waldemar Kmentt, Harald Hermann, Vanguard Bach Guild 1952
- J. S. Bach: Cantata 63, Christen, ätzet diesen Tag, and the Magnificat, Günther Ramin, Thomanerchor, Gewandhausorchester, Ulrike Taube, Sibylla Plate, Gert Lutze, Hans Hauptmann, Schola Antiqua 1953
- Die Bach Kantate Vol. 61, Helmuth Rilling, Gächinger Kantorei, Bach-Collegium Stuttgart, Maria Friesenhausen, Julia Hamari, Adalbert Kraus, Wolfgang Schöne, Hänssler 1971
- Bach Cantatas Vol. 1 – Advent and Christmas, Karl Richter, Münchener Bach-Chor, Münchener Bach-Orchester. Edith Mathis, Anna Reynolds, Peter Schreier, Dietrich Fischer-Dieskau, Archiv Produktion 1972
- J. S. Bach: Das Kantatenwerk – Complete Cantatas Vol. 16, Nikolaus Harnoncourt, Tölzer Knabenchor, Concentus Musicus Wien, Peter Jelosits (soloist of Vienna Boys' Choir), Paul Esswood, Kurt Equiluz, Ruud van der Meer, Teldec 242565-2 1976
- J. S. Bach: Complete Cantatas Vol. 3, Ton Koopman, Amsterdam Baroque Orchestra & Choir, Ruth Holton, Elisabeth von Magnus, Paul Agnew, Klaus Mertens, Antoine Marchand 1995
- J. S. Bach: Cantatas Vol. 7, Masaaki Suzuki, Bach Collegium Japan, Ingrid Schmithüsen, Yoshikazu Mera, Makoto Sakurada, Peter Kooy, BIS 1997
- J. S. Bach: Christmas Cantatas, John Eliot Gardiner, Monteverdi Choir, English Baroque Soloists, Ann Monoyios, Sara Mingardo, Rufus Müller, Stephan Loges, Soli Deo Gloria 1998
- Bach Edition Vol. 18 – Cantatas Vol. 9, Pieter Jan Leusink, Holland Boys Choir, Netherlands Bach Collegium, Marjon Strijk, Sytse Buwalda, Nico van der Meel, Bas Ramselaar, Brilliant Classics 2000
- J. S. Bach: Christmas Cantatas from Leipzig, Philippe Herreweghe, Collegium Vocale Gent, Carolyn Sampson, Ingeborg Danz, Mark Padmore, Sebastian Noack, Harmonia Mundi France 2002
- Bach: Cantata 63; Mendelssohn: Vom Himmel hoch; Vaughan Williams: The First Nowell, Vladimir Jurowski, London Philharmonic Orchestra and Choir, Lisa Milne, Ruxandra Donose, Andrew Staples, Christopher Maltman, LPO 2009
- Thomanerchor Leipzig – Das Kirchenjahr mit Bach, Vol. 2: Weihnachten · Christmas – Cantatas BWV 63, 110, 190, Georg Christoph Biller, Thomanerchor, Gewandhausorchester, soloist of the Thomanerchor, Christoph Genz, Matthias Weichert, Rondeau Production 2011
