= Gloria in excelsis Deo, BWV 191 =

1742 church cantata by Johann Sebastian Bach

Gloria in excelsis Deo
- BWV 191
- Church cantata by J. S. Bach
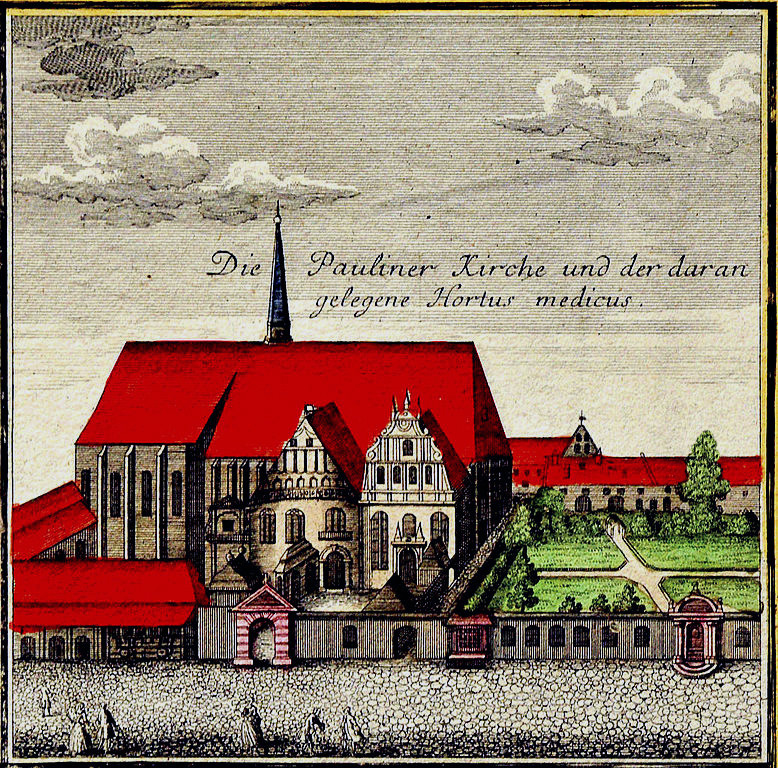
- Paulinerkirche, Leipzig, 1740s
- Related: Gloria of Missa, BWV 232 I (early version)
- Occasion: Christmas
- Text: Gloria, Doxology
- Performed: 25 December 1742: Paulinerkirche, Leipzig
- Movements: 3
- Vocal: Soprano and tenor soloists; SSATB choir
- Instrumental: 3 trumpets; timpani; 2 traversos; 2 oboes; strings; continuo

Gloria in excelsis Deo (Glory to God in the Highest), BWV 191, is a church cantata written by the German Baroque composer Johann Sebastian Bach, and the only one of his church cantatas set to a Latin text. He composed the Christmas cantata in Leipzig probably in 1742, for a celebration by the university of Leipzig. The composition's three movements all derive from the Gloria of Bach's 1733 Kyrie–Gloria Mass, which the composer would later use as the Gloria of his Mass in B minor.

== History ==
Gloria in excelsis Deo was written in Leipzig for Christmas Day, as indicated by the heading on the manuscript in Bach's own handwriting, "J.J. Festo Nativit: Xsti." (Jesu Juva Festo Nativitatis Christi – Celebration for the birth of Christ), to be sung around the sermon. Recent archival and manuscript evidence suggest the cantata was probably first performed in 1742, for a regular Christmas celebration by the university of Leipzig at the Paulinerkirche, rather than in 1743, or 1745 at a special Christmas Day service to celebrate the Peace of Dresden, which brought to an end the hardships imposed on the region by the Second Silesian War,

Unlike Bach's other church cantatas, the words are not in German, taken from the Bible, a chorale or contemporary poetry, but in Latin, taken from the Gloria and the Doxology. This late work is the only Latin cantata among around 200 surviving sacred cantatas in German. It is based on an earlier composition, Bach's 1733 Mass for the Dresden court, which would, in 1748, become the first part of his monumental Mass in B minor. The first movement (Gloria) is an almost identical copy of the first two movements of the Gloria of the earlier work, while the second and third movements are close parodies of the earlier Gloria's fifth and ninth movements. Parts, for instance, of the fugal section of Sicut erat in principio, taken from the Cum sancto spiritu of the 1733 setting, are moved from a purely vocal to an instrumentally accompanied setting. The modifications Bach made to the last two movements of BWV 191, however, were not carried over into the final manuscript compilation of the Mass in B minor, leaving it a matter of speculation whether or not these constitute "improvements" to Bach's original score.

== Scoring, words and structure ==
The cantata bears the heading ::J.J. Festo Nativit: Xsti. Gloria in excelsis Deo. à 5 Voci. 3 Trombe Tymp. 2 Trav 2 Hautb. 2 Violini Viola e Cont. Di J.S.B. in Bach's own handwriting. The cantata is festively scored for soprano and tenor soloists and an unusual five-part choir (with a dual soprano part), three trumpets, timpani, two flauto traverso, two oboes, two violins, viola, and basso continuo. Its only link to Christmas is the opening chorus on Luke (Luke 2:14), to be performed before the sermon. The other two movements after the sermon (marked "post orationem") divide the general words of the Doxology in a duet Gloria Patri et Filio et Spiritui sancto (corresponding to the Domine Deus, the central piece of the Gloria of the Mass in B minor) and a final chorus Sicut erat in principio (corresponding to Mass in B minor structure#Cum sancto spiritu of the Gloria). The final movement may contain ripieno markings (to accompany the chorus) similar to the ripieni found in Unser Mund sei voll Lachens, BWV 110, which was also a nativity cantata.

1. Coro: Gloria in excelsis Deo
2. Duetto (soprano/tenor): Gloria Patri et Filio et Spiritui sancto
3. Coro: Sicut erat in principio

== Recordings ==
- Die Bach Kantate Vol. 16, Helmuth Rilling, Gächinger Kantorei, Bach-Collegium Stuttgart, Nobuko Gamo-Yamamoto, Adalbert Kraus, Hänssler 1971
- J. S. Bach: Weihnachtsoratorium, Ludwig Güttler, Concentus Vocalis Wien, Virtuosi Saxoniae, Christiane Oelze, Hans Peter Blochwitz, Dresden Classics 1995
- J. S. Bach: Complete Cantatas Vol. 21, Ton Koopman, Amsterdam Baroque Orchestra & Choir, Caroline Stam, Paul Agnew, Antoine Marchand 1999
- Bach Cantatas Vol. 18: Weimar/Leipzig/Hamburg / For Christmas Day & for Epiphany / For the 1st Sunday after Epiphany, John Eliot Gardiner, Monteverdi Choir, English Baroque Soloists, Claron McFadden, Christoph Genz, Soli Deo Gloria 1999
- J. S. Bach: Kantate BWV 191 «Gloria in Excelsis Deo», Rudolf Lutz, Vokalensemble der Schola Seconda Pratica, Schola Seconda Pratica, Gerlinde Sämann, Johannes Kaleschke, Gallus Media 2009
- Bach Cantatas Vol. 55, Masaaki Suzuki, Bach Collegium Japan, Hana Blažíková, Gerd Türk, BIS Records 2013
