= Fallt mit Danken, fallt mit Loben, BWV 248 IV =

Christmas cantata of Johann Sebastian Bach

Fallt mit Danken, fallt mit Loben
- BWV 248 IV
- Christmas cantata by J. S. Bach
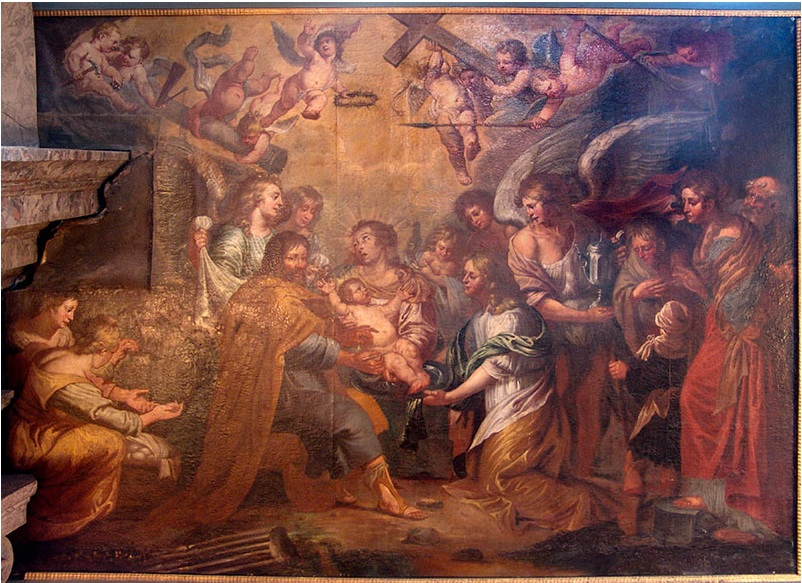
- The Circumcision of Christ, by Michael Angelo Immenraet, Unionskirche, Idstein
- Related: based on BWV 213; Christmas Oratorio (Part IV)
- Occasion: New Year's Day
- Bible text: Luke 2:21
- Chorale: from Johann Rist's "Jesu, du mein liebstes Leben"; from Rist's "Hilf, Herr Jesu, laß gelingen"
- Performed: 1 January 1735: Leipzig
- Movements: 9
- Vocal: SATB choir; soprano, tenor and bass soloists
- Instrumental: 2 horns; 2 oboes; 2 violins; viola; continuo

Fallt mit Danken, fallt mit Loben (Fall with thanks, fall with praise), BWV 248^{IV} (also written as BWV 248 IV), is a Christmas cantata by Johann Sebastian Bach, composed in 1734 as Part IV of his six-part Christmas Oratorio. Each part of the oratorio is a cantata, written for performance on one of the feast days of the Christmas period. Fallt mit Danken, fallt mit Loben is meant for the New Year's Day feast of the circumcision and naming of Jesus. Based on a libretto by an unknown author, it tells the naming of Jesus from the Nativity of Jesus, according to the Gospel of Luke.

Bach structured the cantata in seven movements, and scored it for three vocal soloists, a four-part choir, and a festive Baroque orchestra with horns, oboes and strings. The opening chorus and the two arias are based on his earlier secular cantata Laßt uns sorgen, laßt uns wachen, BWV 213, composed for the 11th birthday of the crown prince of Saxony on 5 September 1733.

The tenor soloist, in the role of the Evangelist, (Note: Singers in Bach's oratorios could play different roles: recitative, ensemble commentary, or solo commentary (accompanying the recitative, or as an aria). Each of these was written in a different musical style to help guide listeners in understanding the difference between narrative and commentary.) narrates the Biblical verse in recitative style. The choir sings the elaborate opening movement and the closing chorale, a four-part setting of a stanza from Johann Rist's "Hilf, Herr Jesu, laß gelingen". Four solo movements reflect the name of Jesus, and life for him. Bach led the first performances at the two main churches of Leipzig in a morning service and a vespers service on 1 January 1735.

== Background and text ==
Bach composed Fallt mit Danken, fallt mit Loben in 1734, eleven years after he became Thomaskantor in Leipzig, director of music in major churches in the town in the Electorate of Saxony. The cantata forms Part IV of his Christmas Oratorio which was performed on six occasions of Christmastide, beginning with Part I on Christmas Day:

- Part I, Jauchzet, frohlocket!, for Christmas Day (25 December): Nativity of Jesus
- Part II for the Second Day of Christmas (26 December): Annunciation to the shepherds, Glory to God, peace on earth
- Part III for the Third Day of Christmas (27 December): Adoration of the shepherds
- Part IV, Fallt mit Danken, fallt mit Loben, for New Year's Day (1 January): Naming of Jesus
- Part V for the Sunday after New Year's Day: Biblical Magi
- Part VI for Epiphany (6 January): Adoration of the Magi

The prescribed readings for the feast day were "by faith we inherit" from the Epistle to the Galatians (Galatians 3:23–29), and from the Gospel of Luke, the ritual circumcision and naming of Jesus eight days after his birth (Luke 2:21).

The librettist of the text is unknown; scholars debate whether he was Picander, who had collaborated with Bach before. After an opening chorus, the Evangelist narrates the short gospel about the naming of Jesus from the Gospel of Luke. It is reflected in the following movements, recitative and arias. Bach structured the work in nine movements, and scored it for four vocal parts and a festive Baroque orchestra with two natural horns, oboes and strings. Several movements rely on music which he had composed earlier, from the secular cantata Laßt uns sorgen, laßt uns wachen, BWV 213 (Let us take care, let us watch over), a dramma per musica describing the story of "Hercules at the Crossroads", written for 11th birthday of Crown Prince Friedrich Christian of Saxony and first performed on 5 September 1733.

The tenor soloist narrates the verse from Martin Luther's translation of the Bible in recitative as the Evangelist (Luke 2:21). Bach incorporates two chorales, two stanzas from "Jesu, du mein liebstes Leben" by Johann Rist for a soprano complement to bass recitatives, and the 15th stanza of the same hymnist's "Hilf, Herr Jesu, laß gelingen" which the choir sings in a four-part setting with independent orchestra.

Bach led the first performance at the Nikolaikirche with the Thomanerchor in a morning service on New Year's Day 1735, repeated in a vespers service at the Thomaskirche the same day.

== Music ==
=== Scoring and structure ===
The cantata is structured in seven movements: it opens with an extended choral movement that expresses the call to fall down with thanks and praise, followed by a brief recitative that provides the account from the Luther Bible of the naming of Jesus on the day of his circumcision. Four movements then reflect on the name of Jesus in meditation and prayer, and the composition is closed with an affirming chorale.

The work features three vocal soloists, a four-part choir (SATB) and a Baroque instrumental ensemble of two natural horns (Co), two oboes (Ob), two violins (Vl), viola (Va) and basso continuo. Other sections of the Christmas Oratorio (such as Jauchzet, frohlocket, the opening chorus of Part I, and in Part VI both the opening chorus, Herr, wenn die stolzen Feinde schnauben, and the closing chorale fantasia, Nun seid ihr wohl gerochen) have a brighter feel than Fallt mit Danken, fallt mit Loben. Its music, in F major, is dominated by two horns and has a more intimate character than the sections with bright trumpets which precede and follow it. Alfred Dürr gives the duration as 27 minutes.

In the following table, the movement numbers of the Christmas Oratorio are added in brackets. The scoring follows the Neue Bach-Ausgabe (New Bach Edition). The keys and time signatures are from Dürr, and use the symbol for common time. No key is shown for the recitatives, because they modulate. The continuo, played throughout, is also not shown.

Movements of Fallt mit Danken, fallt mit Loben
No.	Title	Text	Type	Vocal	Brass	Winds	Strings	Key	Time
1 (36)	Fallt mit Danken, fallt mit Loben	anon.	Chorus	SATB	2Co	2Ob	2Vl Va	F major	3/8
2 (37)	Und da acht Tage um waren	Luke 2:21	Recitative	T					common time
3 (38)	Immanuel, o süßes Wort! Jesu, du mein liebstes Leben	anon. Rist	Recitativo e chorale	B S			2Vl Va		common time
4 (39)	Flößt, mein Heiland	anon.	Aria	S & echo S		Ob		C major	6/8
5 (40)	Wohlan, dein Name soll allein Jesu, meine Freud und Wonne	anon. Rist	Recitativo e chorale	B S			2Vl Va		common time
6 (41)	Ich will nur dir zu Ehren leben	anon.	Aria	T			2Vl (solo)	D minor	common time
7 (42)	Jesus richte mein Beginnen	Rist	Chorale	SATB	2Co	2Ob	2Vl Va	F major	3/4

=== Movements ===
==== 1 ====
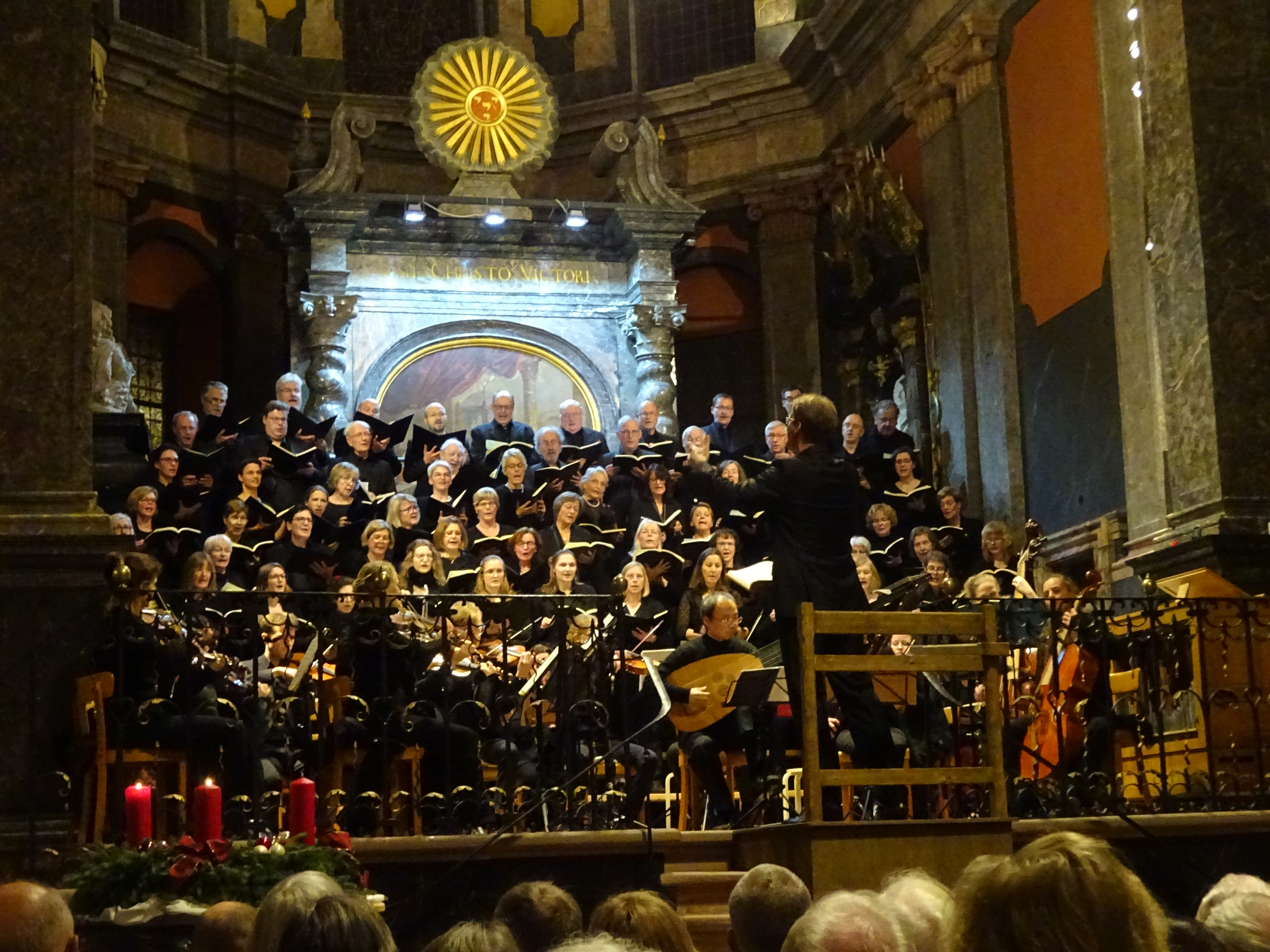
Performance of the cantata in 2018 at Unionskirche, Idstein, a Protestant church decorated in the 17th century, 2018

The opening chorus, "Fallt mit Danken, fallt mit Loben vor des Höchsten Gnadenthron!" (With gratitude, with praise, fall before the Almighty's throne of grace!), is a complex long form (ABA'). The instrumental ritornello is dominated by two natural horns.

The voices enter in unison. In the middle section, the vocal lines are also mostly homophonic. The last section uses the material from the first section, but differently.

==== 2 ====
The tenor sings in a secco recitative the verse from the Biblical Christmas story, "Und da acht Tage um waren, dass das Kind beschnitten würde" (And when eight days had passed, when the child would be circumcised), after Luke 2:21.

==== 3 ====
In a combination of recitative and chorale, the bass recitative, "Wer will die Liebe recht erhöhn" (Who can rightly exalt this love), is balanced with line-by-line commentary by the chorus. The commentary is the first stanza from Rist's hymn "Jesu, du mein liebstes Leben" (Jesus, o my dearest life). The voices are supported by strings.

==== 4 ====
In the central soprano da capo aria, "Flößt, mein Heiland, flößt dein Namen auch den allerkleinsten Samen jenes strengen Schreckens ein?" (O my Savior, does your name instill even the very tiniest seed of that powerful terror?), the singer asks Jesus three questions and imagines the answers as "no", "no" and "yes", illustrated in the form of an echo-aria. An oboe is the obbligato instrument.

==== 5 ====
In symmetry to the third movement, another bass recitative, "Wohlan, dein Name soll allein in meinem Herzen sein!" (Well then, Your name alone shall be in my heart!), is commented on by another stanza, "Jesu, meine Freud und Wonne" (Jesus, my joy and delight) from the same hymn. The voices are again supported by strings.

==== 6 ====
The tenor aria, "Ich will nur dir zu Ehren leben" (I will live only for Your honor), expresses a vow to revere Jesus. It is a fugal trio composition with two solo violins.

==== 7 ====
The cantata is closed with the chorale "Jesus richte mein Beginnen" (May Jesus order my beginning), the 15th stanza of Rist's hymn "Hilf, Herr Jesu, laß gelingen". All instruments play interludes which recall the opening movement.

== Cited sources ==
Bach Digital

- "Fallt mit Danken, fallt mit Loben / (Christmas oratorio, part 4) BWV 248 IV; BC D 7 I". Bach Digital.
- "Lasst uns sorgen, lasst uns wachen (Dramma per musica) BWV 213; BC G 18 / Secular cantata (unknown purpose)". Bach Digital.

Books

- Dürr, Alfred; Jones, Richard D. P. (2006). The Cantatas of J. S. Bach: With Their Librettos in German-English Parallel Text. Oxford University Press. pp. 144, 157–162. ISBN 978-0-19-929776-4.
- Hofmann, Klaus (2005). "Foreword" (PDF). Johann Sebastian Bach / Weihnachtsoratorium / Christmas Oratorio. Carus-Verlag. p. 4.
- Melamed, Daniel R. (24 March 2005). Hearing Bach's Passions. Oxford University Press. ISBN 978-0-19-988346-2.
- Rathey, Markus (2016). Johann Sebastian Bach's Christmas Oratorio: Music, Theology, Culture. Oxford University Press. pp. 148–152. ISBN 978-0-19-027526-6.
- Wessel, Jens (2015). "Köthen (1717–1723)" ( PDF). J. S. Bach und die italienische Oper / Drammi per musica für das kurfürstlich-sächsische und polnische Königshaus zwischen 1733 und 1736 (dissertation) (in German). Hochschule für Musik und Theater Hamburg. pp. 25–44, 47, 99–100.

Online sources

- Bischof, Walter F. (2018). "BWV 248IV Fallt mit Danken, fallt mit Loben / Weihnachts-Oratorium IV". University of Alberta.
- Dahn, Luke (2018). "BWV 248(4).42(7)". bach-chorales.com.
- Dellal, Pamela (2021). "BWV 248-IV – Fallt mit Danken, fallt mit Loben". pameladellal.com.
