= Nicolaus Bruhns =

Danish-German organist, violinist, and composer

- Born: 1665; Schwabstedt
- Died: 8 April 1697 (aged 31–32)
- Occupations: Composer; Organist; Violinist

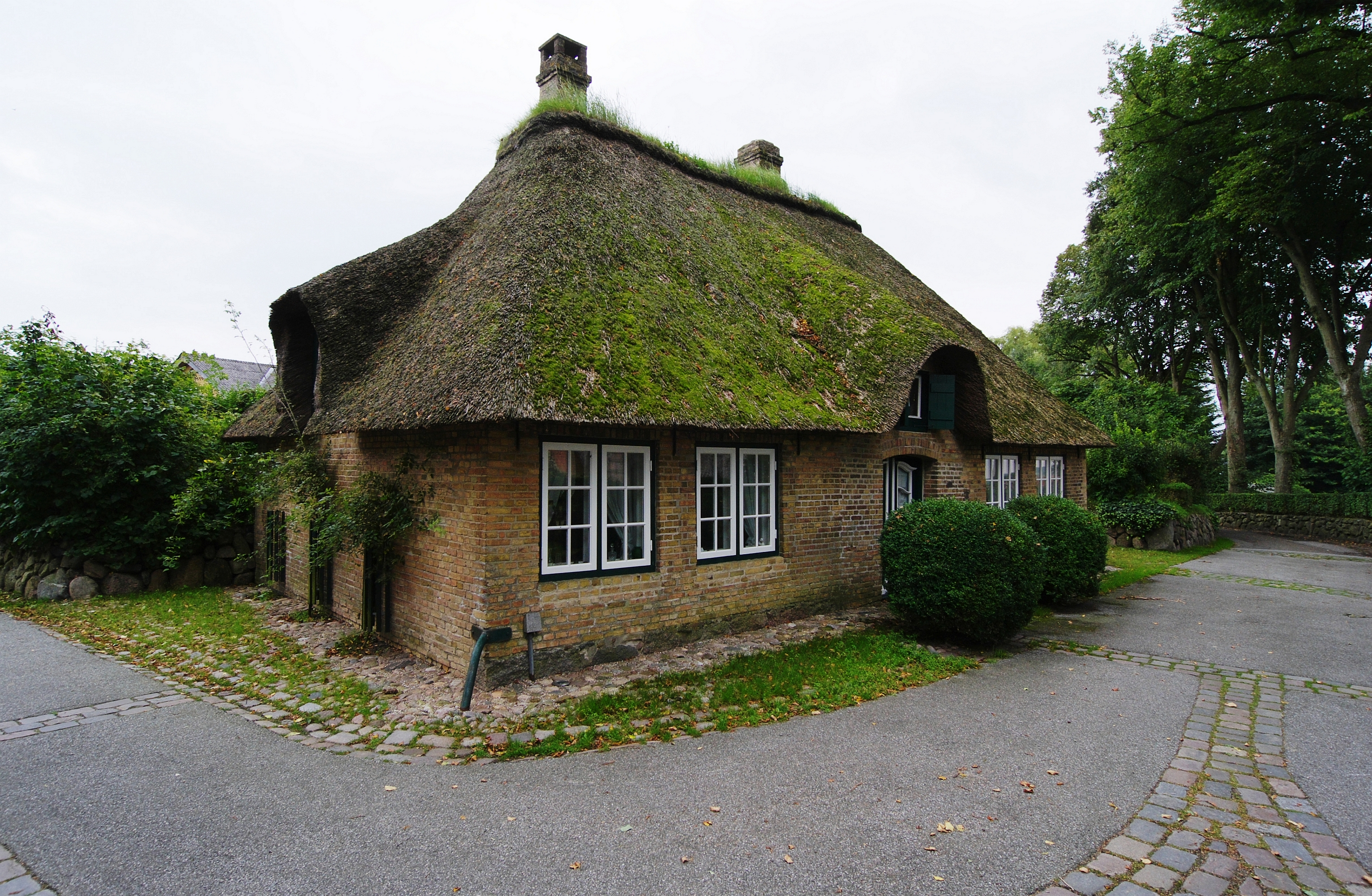
Nicolaus Bruhns House in Schwabstedt

Nicolaus Bruhns (also Nikolaus, Nicholas; late 1665 – 8 April [O.S. 29 March] 1697 in Husum) was a Danish-German organist, violinist, and composer. He was one of the most prominent organists and composers of his generation.

== Biography ==
Bruhns was born in Schwabstedt (Danish: Svavsted), a small settlement near Husum. He came from a family of musicians and composers. His grandfather, Paul Jakob Bruhns (died 1655), worked as lutenist in Lübeck. His three sons all chose musical careers; Bruhns' father, also named Paul (1640–c. 1689), became organist at Schwabstedt, possibly after studying with Franz Tunder. Nicolaus was apparently a child prodigy: according to Ernst Ludwig Gerber, he could play the organ and compose competent works for keyboard and voice already at an early age. He probably received his first music lessons from his father.

At age sixteen, Bruhns, together with his younger brother Georg (1666-1742), was sent to Lübeck to live with their uncle Peter, who would teach Bruhns the violin and the viola da gamba. The two brothers also studied the organ and composition; Georg under Bernhard Olffen, organist of St. Aegidien, and Nicolaus under Dieterich Buxtehude. The latter, one of the best composers of his time, was so impressed with Bruhns' talents and progress that he considered him his best pupil and eventually recommended him for Copenhagen. There Bruhns worked as organist and violinist. On 29 March 1689 he competed for the position of organist of the Stadtkirche in Husum and was unanimously accepted. In a few months he was offered a position at Kiel, but declined when the authorities at Husum increased his salary. Bruhns remained in Husum until his untimely death in 1697, at the age of 31. His only son, Johan Paul, chose a career in theology. Bruhns was succeeded in Husum by his brother Georg.

== Works ==
Bruhns' surviving oeuvre is unfortunately small: only 12 vocal and 5 organ pieces are extant. The vocal works include four sacred concertos that established a new level of virtuosity in the genre, and three sacred madrigal cantatas that represent a direct link with the next century and the work of Johann Sebastian Bach. Although the instrumental writing in most of these works suggests that Bruhns could only rely on musicians of average skill, there are movements, such as the opening sonatina of the solo cantata Mein Herz ist bereit, that feature highly developed, virtuosic textures. Bruhns almost certainly wrote chamber music, but no works of this type survive.

The organ works comprise four praeludia and a chorale fantasia on the hymn "Nun komm, der Heiden Heiland". The most significant of these pieces is the larger of the two E minor praeludia, which is usually cited as one of the greatest works of the North German organ tradition. Although Johann Sebastian Bach's son Carl Philipp Emanuel Bach claimed that his father admired and studied Bruhns' work, no direct influence has been traced by scholars.

== List of works ==
=== Vocal ===
- Muss nicht der Mensch auf dieser Erden in stetem Streite sein
- O werter heil'ger Geist
- Hemmt eure Traenenflut
- Ich liege und schlafe
- Jauchzet dem Herren
- Wohl dem, der den Herren fürchtet
- De profundis
- Paratum cor meum
- Die Zeit meines Abschieds ist vorhanden
- Erstanden ist der heilige Christ
- Der Herr hat seinen Stuhl im Himmel bereitet
- Mein Herz ist bereit – Example and sheet music

=== Instrumental ===
Nikolaus Bruhns
Organ works
"Kleines" Praeludium in e-Moll

Großes Praeludium in E minor

Adagio in D major
performed by Yaroslav Kayuk, organ.

Organ works

- Großes Praeludium in E minor – Example (info), sheet music
- Kleines Praeludium in E minor – Example and sheet music
- Chorale Fantasy on "Nun Komm der Heiden Heiland"
- Praeludium in G major
- Fragment of Praeludiums in D major
- Praeludium in G minor (also attributed to Brunckhorst)

== Other sources ==
- McLean, Hugh J. (2001). "Bruhns, Nicolaus". In Sadie, Stanley; Tyrrell, John (eds.). The New Grove Dictionary of Music and Musicians. Vol. iv (2nd ed.). London: Macmillan. pp. 492–493. ISBN 978-1-56159-239-5.

The most recent and concise summary of Bruhns' life and works available in English.

- Webber, Geoffrey. North German church music in the age of Buxtehude. Oxford: Clarendon Press, 1996. ISBN 0-19-816212-X.

Covers a wide variety of topics related to church music, with considerable space given to Bruhns.

- Snyder, Kerala J. Dieterich Buxtehude: Organist in Lübeck. New York: Schirmer Books, 1987. ISBN 0-02-873080-1.

This definitive biography of Buxtehude includes significant discussion of Bruhns' early life and context.

- Fosse, R.C. "Nicolaus Bruhns", pp. 92–107 in The Musical Heritage of the Lutheran Church, ed. T. Hoelty-Nickel. St. Louis: Concordia Publishing House, 1959.

The first substantial consideration of Bruhns in English.

- Geck, Martin. Nicolaus Bruhns: Leben und Werk. Köln: Musikverlag H. Gerig, 1968. (in German)

Somewhat dated, this remains the central study of Bruhns to date.

- Kölsch, Heinz. Nicolaus Bruhns. Kassel: Bärenreiter-Verlag, 1958. Issued in 1938 as thesis, Kiel. (in German)

The first landmark study of Bruhns' life and works.

- Fructus, Michel. L'oeuvre d'orgue de Nicolaus Bruhns (1665-1697), Essai sur la persuasion musicale dans l'Allemagne baroque du XVIIe siècle, DEA de Musicologie, Lyon, 1999, 2 vol.
- Fructus, Michel. Les cantates de Nicolaus Bruhns (1665-1697), Thèse de Doctorat de Musicologie, Lyon, 2009, 3 vol.
