= Sehet, welch eine Liebe hat uns der Vater erzeiget, BWV 64 =

Church cantata by Johann Sebastian Bach

Sehet, welch eine Liebe hat uns der Vater erzeiget
- BWV 64
- Christmas cantata by J. S. Bach
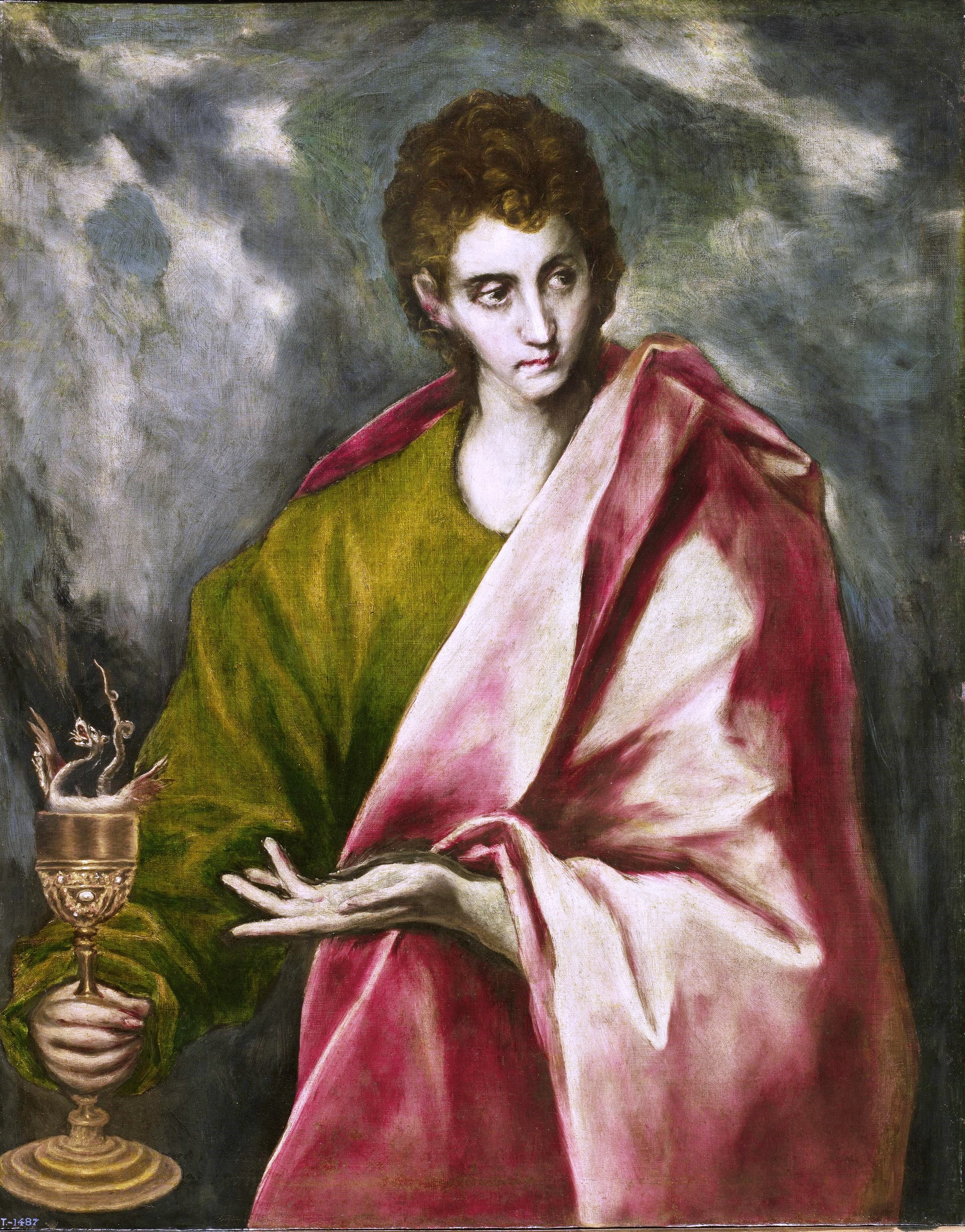
- John the Evangelist, celebrated on 27 December
- Occasion: Third Day of Christmas
- Bible text: 1 John 3:1
- Chorale: "Gelobet seist du, Jesu Christ"; by Balthasar Kindermann; "Jesu, meine Freude"
- Performed: 27 December 1723: Leipzig
- Movements: 8
- Vocal: SATB choir; soprano, alto and bass solo
- Instrumental: cornett; 3 trombones; oboe d'amore; 2 violins; viola; continuo

Sehet, welch eine Liebe hat uns der Vater erzeiget (Behold, what a love has the Father shown to us), BWV 64, is a church cantata by Johann Sebastian Bach. He composed the Christmas cantata in Leipzig in 1723 for the third day of Christmas, which is also the Feast of John the Evangelist, and first performed it on 27 December 1723.

== History and text ==
Bach wrote the cantata in his first year as Thomaskantor in Leipzig, as part of his first cantata cycle, for the Third Day of Christmas. The prescribed readings for the day are from the Epistle to the Hebrews, Christ is higher than the angels, (Hebrews 1:1–14) and the prologue of the Gospel of John, also called Hymn to the Word (John 1:1–14). The unknown poet referred only in a general way to the readings and stressed the aspect that being loved by God in the way which Christmas shows, the believer does not have to be concerned about the "world" any more. Three chorales are included in the text, rarely found in Bach's cantatas, but also in Darzu ist erschienen der Sohn Gottes, BWV 40, Bach's first cantata composed for Christmas in Leipzig and performed the day before, and in Schau, lieber Gott, wie meine Feind, BWV 153, written for 2 January 1724, only a few days later. Possibly these works were written by the same author. The first movement is based on 1 John 3:1. The only Christmas chorale is verse 7 of Luther's "Gelobet seist du, Jesu Christ" as movement 2. Movement 4 is the first verse of Balthasar Kindermann's "Was frag ich nach der Welt". The cantata is concluded by "Gute Nacht, o Wesen", verse 5 of Johann Franck's "Jesu, meine Freude". Bach first performed the cantata on 27 December 1723.

== Scoring and structure ==
The cantata is scored for soprano, alto and bass soloists, a four-part choir, zink and three trombones, oboe d'amore, two violins, viola, and basso continuo.

1. Chorus: Sehet, welch eine Liebe hat uns der Vater erzeiget
2. Chorale: Das hat er alles uns getan
3. Recitative (alto): Geh, Welt! behalte nur das Deine
4. Chorale: Was frag ich nach der Welt
5. Aria (soprano): Was die Welt in sich hält
6. Recitative (bass): Der Himmel bleibet mir gewiß
7. Aria (alto): Von der Welt verlang ich nichts
8. Chorale: Gute Nacht, o Wesen

== Music ==
The opening chorus is set in motet style; an archaic-sounding choir of trombones doubles the voices. The alto recitative is accompanied by vigorous scales in the continuo. In the soprano aria, a Gavotte, a virtuoso solo violin possibly represents the "worldly things". The alto aria is accompanied by the oboe d'amore in melodic lyricism. The chorale "Gute Nacht, o Wesen" (Good night, existence) is set for four parts.

== Recordings ==
- Bach Cantatas Vol. 1 – Advent and Christmas, Karl Richter, Münchener Bach-Chor, Münchener Bach-Orchester, Edith Mathis, Anna Reynolds, Dietrich Fischer-Dieskau, Archiv Produktion 1972
- Die Bach Kantate Vol. 63, Helmuth Rilling, Gächinger Kantorei, Bach-Collegium Stuttgart, Arleen Augér, Ann Murray, Philippe Huttenlocher, Hänssler 1981
- J. S. Bach: Complete Cantatas Vol. 8, Ton Koopman, Amsterdam Baroque Orchestra & Choir, Dorothea Röschmann, Bogna Bartosz, Klaus Mertens, Antoine Marchand 1998
- J. S. Bach: Cantatas Vol. 13, Masaaki Suzuki, Bach Collegium Japan, Yukari Nonoshita, Robin Blaze, Peter Kooy, BIS 1999
- Bach Cantatas Vol. 15: New York, John Eliot Gardiner, Monteverdi Choir, English Baroque Soloists, Gillian Keith, Robin Tyson, Peter Harvey, Soli Deo Gloria 2000

== Sources ==
- Sehet, welch eine Liebe, BWV 64 (Bach, Johann Sebastian): Scores at the International Music Score Library Project
- Sehet, welch eine Liebe hat uns der Vater erzeiget BWV 64; BC A 15 / Sacred cantata (3rd Christmas Day) Bach Digital
- Cantata BWV 64 Sehet, welch eine Liebe hat uns der Vater erzeiget: history, scoring, sources for text and music, translations to various languages, discography, discussion, Bach Cantatas Website
- BWV 64 Sehet, welch eine Liebe hat uns der Vater erzeiget: English translation, University of Vermont
- BWV 64 Sehet, welch eine Liebe hat uns der Vater erzeiget: text, scoring, University of Alberta
- Chapter 32 BWV 64 Sehet, welch eine Liebe hat uns der Vater erzeiget / See what love the Father has shown us.: a listener and student guide by Julian Mincham, 2010
- Luke Dahn: BWV 64.2, BWV 64.4, BWV 64.8 bach-chorales.com
