= Medingen Abbey =

Coordinates: 53.090601°N 10.565176°E

Medingen Convent
- Medingen Convent St. Maurice
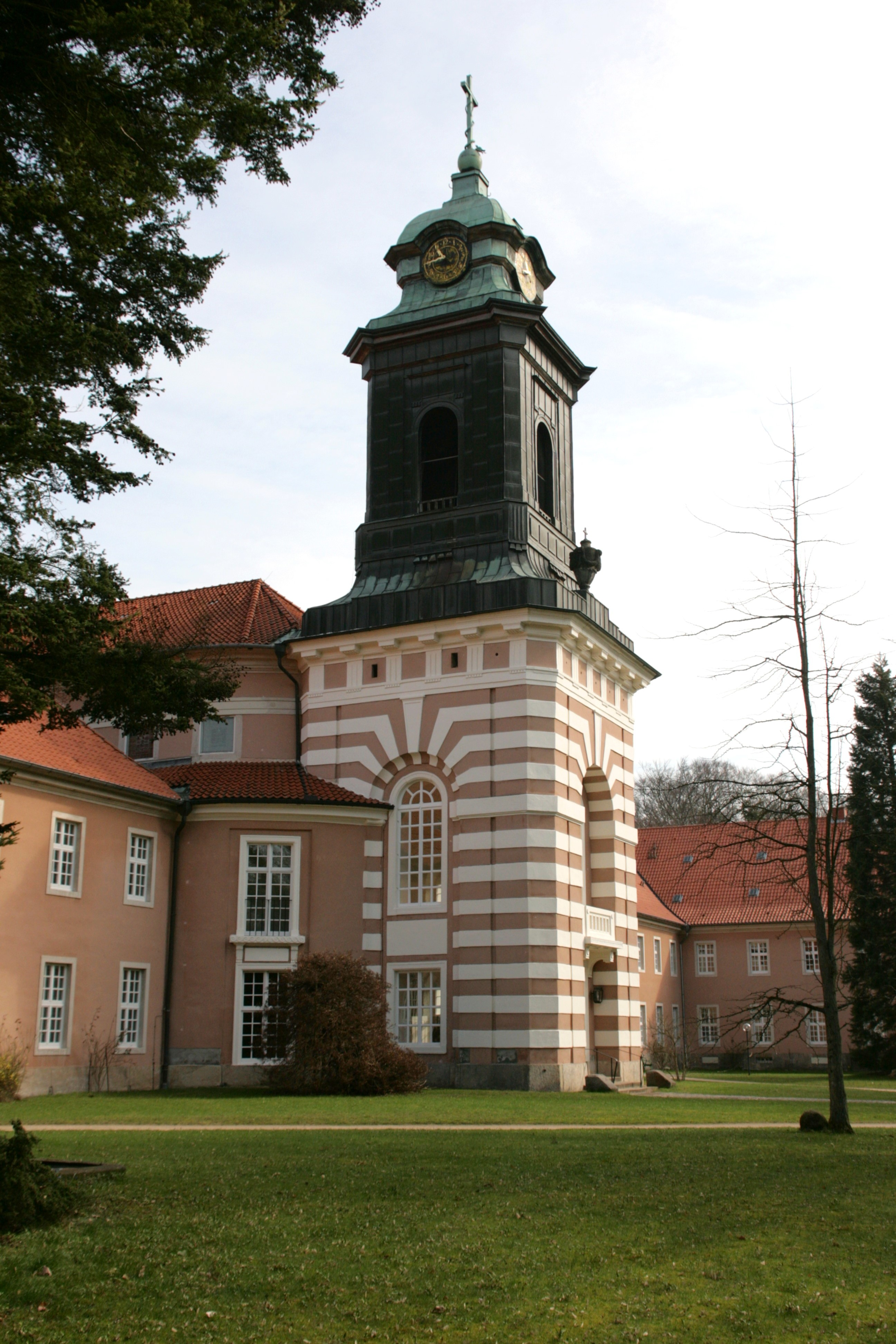

- Location of Convent Medingen in Lower Saxony, Germany
- Location: Medingen, Lower Saxony
- Country: Germany
- Denomination: Evangelical-Lutheran
- Previous denomination: Catholic
- Website: www.kloster-medingen.de

History
- Status: Convent
- Founded: 1241

Architecture
- Functional status: Active

Medingen Abbey or Medingen Convent (German: Kloster Medingen) is a convent for women of the Evangelical Lutheran faith (German: Damenstift) near the Lower Saxon town of Bad Bevensen and is supervised by the Monastic Chamber of Hanover (Klosterkammer Hannover). The current director of the abbey (Äbtissin) is the art historian Dr Kristin Püttmann. The abbey was built as a Cistercian nunnery.

== History ==
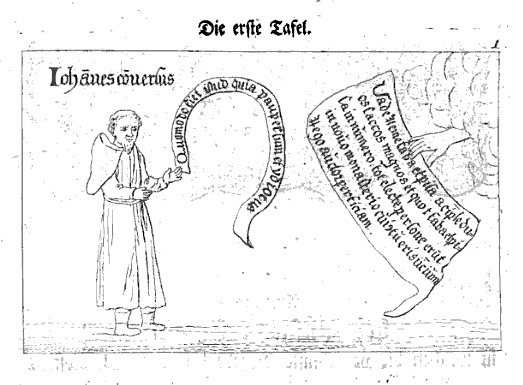
Lay brother Johann receiving the divine order to build a new convent, reproduced by Johann Ludolf Lyssmann, 1772 (original art work produced in 1499)

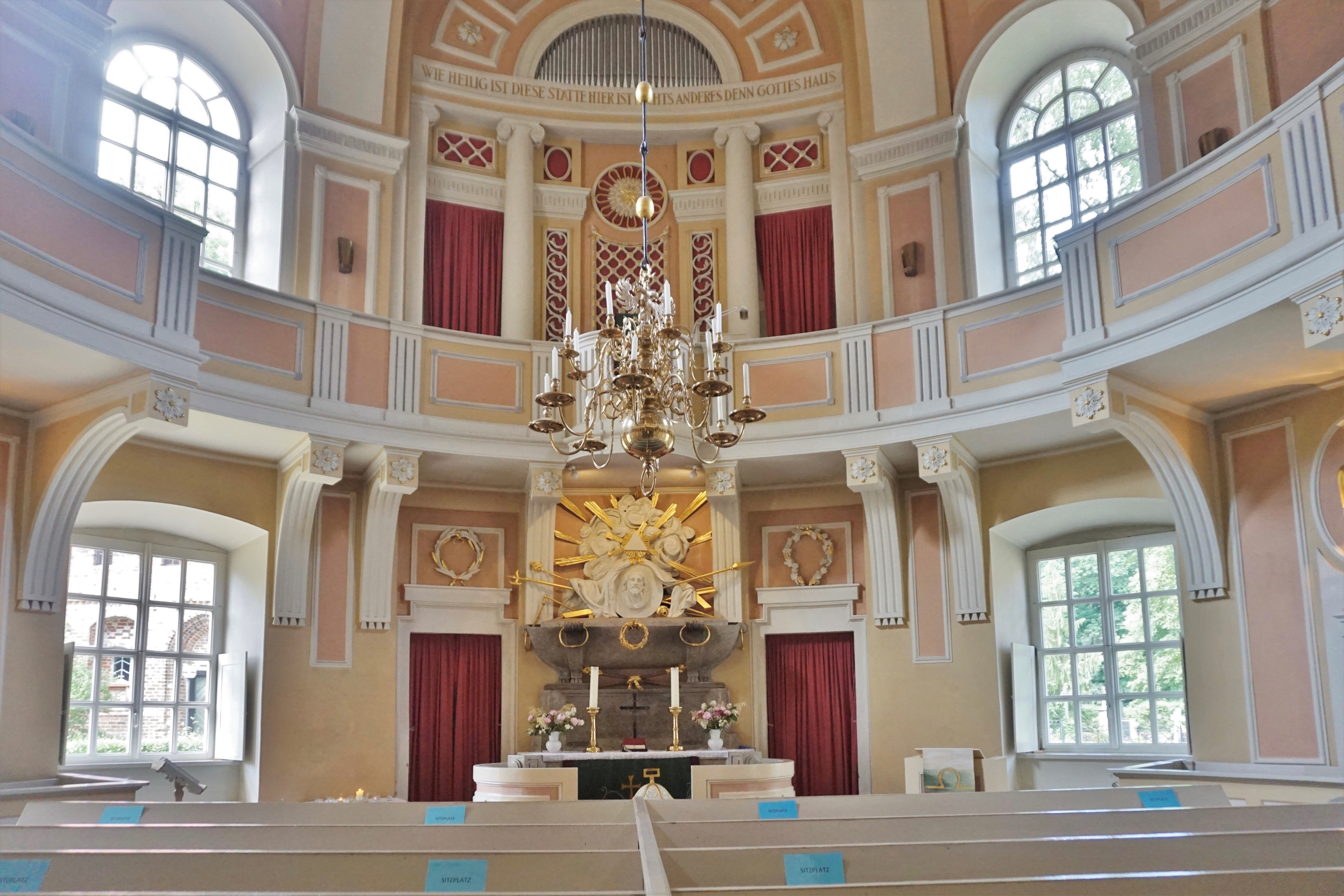
Interior of the convent church in early neoclassical style

A founding legend ascribes the convent's origins to a lay brother called Johannes; the convent's history from its founding to the election of abbess Margaretha Puffen was formerly depicted in a cycle of 15 painted wooden boards, that were destroyed in the fire of 1781; the only surviving copy is the affix in Johann Ludolf Lyßman's Historische Nachrichten (1772). The legend has it that Johannes claimed divine guidance in his quest to build the new convent. The community was founded 1228 in Restorf am Höhbeck by Johannes and four nuns who joined him in Magdeburg, but the group did not stay there. For unknown reasons, they moved on to Plate near Lüchow and later Bohndorf, before they eventually settled in Altenmedingen, where the first buildings were consecrated on 24 August 1241.

The military road passing through the convent yard presented an ever-present danger of attacks or arson, so the convent decided to move one last time, to the village of Zellensen, today's Medingen. The new church was consecrated on 24 August 1336.

1479 saw the advent of the convent reforms under the influence of the devotio moderna. Many convents at that time did not follow the Cistercian rule very strictly; nuns were allowed to keep their belongings and keep in touch with their relatives once they joined the convent. The Cistercian order was re-established and the prioress Margarete Puffen was made an abbess in 1494. After the reforms, a scriptorium became one of the focal points of the convent and to this day a large number of manuscripts found worldwide can be attributed to the sixteenth-century nuns of Medingen. Hymns (Leisen) noted down in these texts are still part of both Catholic and Protestant hymnbooks today, e.g. in the current German Protestant hymnal Evangelisches Gesangbuch EG 23 "Gelobet seist du, Jesu Christ", EG 100 "Wir wollen alle fröhlich sein" and EG 214 "Gott sei gelobet und gebenedeiet", even though they were wrongly dated to the 14th century by the music historian Walther Lipphardt.

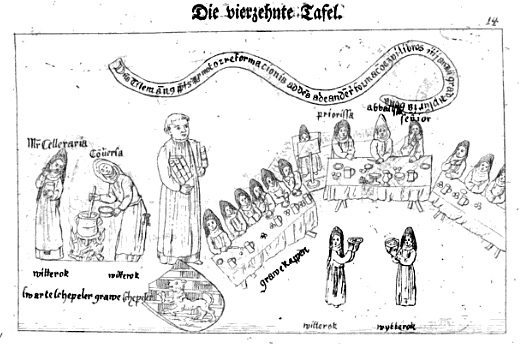
Panel depicting some of the changes in Medingen after the 1479 convent reforms – joint meals where the youngest nun read from the manuscripts, reproduced by Johann Ludolf Lyssmann, 1772 (original art work produced in 1499)

The Reformation attempted to be introduced in Medingen in 1524, was met with resistance from the nuns. They hid their confessor in the attic, publicly burned the Lutheran bible and almost faced the dissolution of the convent. In 1541, the Uelzen Landtag decided to ensure the economic security of Medingen and the five other convents nearby. This was in the nobility's interests, because their unmarried daughters could benefit from the livelihood and education befitting their status. In 1542, all of the convent's goods and earnings were confiscated and contact between the nuns and their family was prohibited. The abbess, Margareta von Stöterogge, did not give in to the demands of bringing all remaining property to Celle, but rather went to Hildesheim for two years, taking the convent's archive and valuables with her. It took her brother, Nikolaus von Stöterogge, to convince her finally to accept the communion under both forms. Eventually, in 1554, the convent became Protestant and from then on, the Klosterordnung (convent order) was defined by the Landesherr or territorial lord.

After the Reformation had been introduced, life changed drastically: The incumbents were now allowed to marry, but had to leave the convent when they did so. In 1605, they replaced the traditional Cistercian habit with an attire in accordance with the convent order introduced by Duke William in 1574. The Thirty Years' War left its mark on the convent and its surrounding area. A new convent order was introduced by Kurfürst (elector) George Louis in 1706.

Most of the convent buildings were destroyed in a fire in January 1781, although valuable possessions like the archives and the abbesses' crosier from 1494 were able to be salvaged. The ruins were demolished in 1782 and the convent re-built in the early neoclassic style. Completed in 1788, the new buildings were consecrated on 24 August.

== List of heads of convent ==
List of provosts
Name	From	Until
Helmerich	1236?	1240
Nikolaus I	1241	1249
Johannes	1261	1261
Nikolaus II	1261	1286
Hartwig von der Sülze	1286	1306
Christian	1306	resigned 1326
Ludolf von Lüneburg	1326	1355
Dietrich Bromes	1355	1358
Dietrich von Langlingen	1359	1370
Johannes Ostermann	1370	1380
Dietrich Brand (von Melle?)	1380	1396
Johannes Meyer	1396	1416
Lüdiger Tolner	1416	resigned 1446
Ludolf Lützken	1446	1464
Dr iur utr Johannes Mahler	1464	1467
Tilemann von Bavenstedt	1467	1494
Ulrich von Bülow	1494	1516
Johann von Mahrenholtz	1516	1516
Bruno von Alten	1516	1518
Johann von Mahrenholtz	1518	1529

List of prioresses
Name	From	Until
Imma I	1263	1284
Imma II	1284	1315
Imma (Irmgard) III	1315	1323
Imma IV Ruffen	1323	1332
Wigburg	1327	1327
Mechthild I von Meding	1333	1343
Elisabeth I von Bernowe	1344	1366
Alburg von dem Sande	1368	1371
Elisabeth II	1376	1379
Elisabeth III	1379	1399
Druda von Dageförde	1399	1428
Mechthild II Semmelbecker	1428	1435
Caecilia von dem Berge	1435	1445
Elisabeth IV Langendorf	1445	1464
Mechthild III von Römstedt	1464	1479
Margaretha I Puffen	1479	1494, later abbess

List of abbesses
Name	From	Until	Denomination
Margaretha I Puffen	1494, former prioress	1513	Catholic
Elisabeth I von Elvern	1513	1524	Catholic
Margaretha II Stöterogge	1524	1567	Catholic
Getrud I von Töbing	1567	1588	Protestant Lutheran
Elisabeth II von Töbing	1588	1630	Protestant Lutheran
Anna I von Sarstedt	1630	1635	Protestant Lutheran
Margaretha III von Dassel	1636	1667	Protestant Lutheran
Margaretha IV von Dassel	1667	1680	Protestant Lutheran
Catharina Prigge	1681	1706	Protestant Lutheran
Clara Anna von Lüneburg	1707	1719	Protestant Lutheran
Anna von Laffert	1720	1721	Protestant Lutheran
Elisabeth Catharina von Stöterogge	1722	1741	Protestant Lutheran
Sophia Catharina von Meiseburg	1741	1750	Protestant Lutheran
Sibylla Hedewig von Laffert	1751	1755	Protestant Lutheran
Margaretha Elisabeth von Braunschweig	1755	1793	Protestant Lutheran
Luise Charlotta von Heimburg	1793	1797	Protestant Lutheran
Sophie Eleonore von Töbing	1798	1810	Protestant Lutheran
Rahel Charlotte von Töbing	1810	1814	Protestant Lutheran
Luise Amalie von Wallmoden	1814	1825	Protestant Lutheran
Auguste von Töbingen	1826	1849	Protestant Lutheran
Ottilie von Brömbsen	1850	1906	Protestant Lutheran
Auguste von Schmidt-Phiseldeck	1907	1917	Protestant Lutheran
Emma von Laffert	1917	1930	Protestant Lutheran
Luise von Brömbsen	1931	1943	Protestant Lutheran
Ilse von Döring	1944	1972	Protestant Lutheran
Helge von Bülow	1972	1989	Protestant Lutheran
Gisela Rothbarth	1989	1999	Protestant Lutheran
Monika von Kleist	1999	2012	Protestant Lutheran
Dr. Kristin Püttmann	since 2012		Protestant Lutheran

== Cultural heritage ==
A large number of medieval manuscripts were produced in Medingen, 44 of which have survived and are conserved all over the world. The nuns enhanced the liturgy written in Latin with Low German prayers and songs, producing unique compilations of illuminated texts that were important to them as well as the noblewomen in the surrounding areas.

Furthermore, the brewery (German: Brauhaus), built in 1397, survived the fire of 1781 and can still be seen today. It attests to the fact that the convent was originally built in the Brick Gothic style.
