= Chorale cantata =

Church cantata based on a (Lutheran) chorale

A chorale cantata is a church cantata based on a chorale—in this context a Lutheran chorale. It is principally from the German Baroque era. The organizing principle is the words and music of a Lutheran hymn. Usually a chorale cantata includes multiple movements or parts. Most chorale cantatas were written between approximately 1650 and 1750. By far the most famous are by Johann Sebastian Bach, especially the cantatas composed in his second annual cycle of cantatas, started in Leipzig in 1724.

== Description ==
The chorale cantata developed out of the chorale concerto, an earlier form much used by Samuel Scheidt in the early 17th century, which incorporated elements of the Venetian School, such as the stile concertato, into the liturgical music of the Protestant Reformation. Later the chorale cantata developed into three general forms:

- a form in which each verse (strophe) of the chorale was developed as an independent movement;
- a form in which the chorale appeared in some of the movements, perhaps only two, while the other parts of the cantata used other texts; and
- the version pioneered by J. S. Bach, in which the first and last movements use the first and last strophes of the chorale, but the inner movements—perhaps aria and recitative—use paraphrases of the chorale text. Typically the beginning and ending movements use all the instrumental and vocal forces, while the interior movements are for smaller groups.

Most compositions in this genre were never published. It was common at the time for composers to write for local performances; often the composer and the music director at a church were the same person, and the music was written, copied and performed in short order, remaining in manuscript. Some 95% of all compositions of this type have been lost.

== Composers ==
Composers of chorale cantatas include:

=== Baroque ===
- Samuel Scheidt
- Johann Andreas Herbst
- Johann Erasmus Kindermann
- Franz Tunder
- Nicolaus Bruhns
- Dieterich Buxtehude
- Johann Krieger
- Sebastian Knüpfer
- Johann Schelle
- Johann Pachelbel, e.g. his sacred concerto Christ lag in Todesbanden, P 60, with one movement for each of the "Christ lag in Todesbanden" hymn's seven stanzas.
- Johann Rosenmüller
- Johannes Crüger
- Joachim Gerstenbüttel
- Georg Bronner
- Christoph Graupner
- Johann Kuhnau
- Georg Philipp Telemann
- Johann Sebastian Bach

=== Post-Baroque ===
- Felix Mendelssohn (Verleih uns Frieden, Vom Himmel hoch)
- Arnold Mendelssohn
- Max Reger
