= Arnold Brunckhorst =

German organist and composer

Arnold Matthias Brunckhorst (1670–1725) was a German organist and composer.

He was born in Celle or Wietzendorf. Beginning in 1693, he served as an organist at St. Andreas in Hildesheim. In 1697, he assumed the organist's post at the Stadtkirche in Celle. In 1720, he was appointed court organist at Hanover.

== Works, editions and recordings ==
Only a few works by him have survived: two small oratorios - for Christmas and Easter, one single-movement keyboard sonata in A major (regarded as the earliest German documentation of the form of the two-part sonata structure, comparable to the formal type encountered in Domenico Scarlatti), and a Praeludium in E minor for organ.

A "Präludium & Fuge" in g minor - which was found not long ago in Berlin and was at first believed to be composed by Nicolaus Bruhns - is now believed to be composed by Brunckhorst.

- Brunckhorst Opera omnia complete works: Weihnachts-Historie, Prelude for Organ in E minor. Oster-Historie, Harpsichord Sonata in A major. Musica Poetica Freiburg, dir. Hans Bergmann
