= Ich bin ein guter Hirt, BWV 85 =

Church cantata by Johann Sebastian Bach

Ich bin ein guter Hirt
- BWV 85
- Church cantata by J. S. Bach
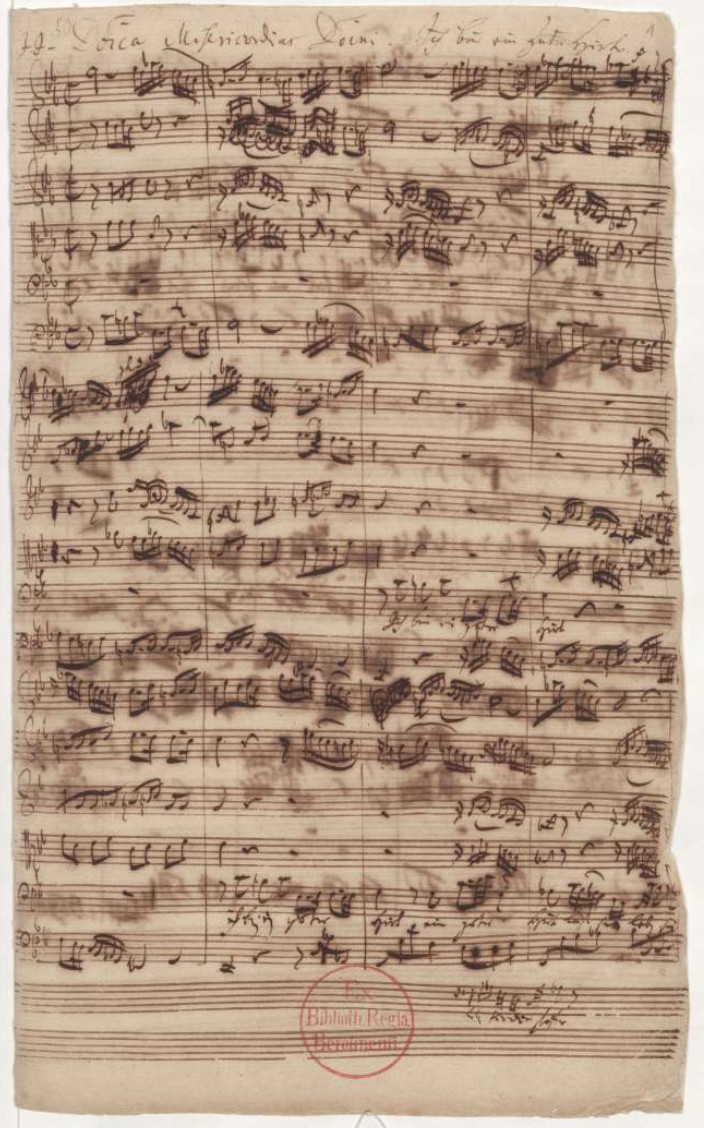
- First page of the autograph score
- Occasion: Second Sunday after Easter
- Bible text: John 10:11
- Chorale: by Ernst Christoph Homberg; Der Herr ist mein getreuer Hirt by Cornelius Becker
- Performed: 14 April 1725: Leipzig
- Movements: 6
- Vocal: SATB solo and choir
- Instrumental: 2 oboes; 2 violins; viola; violoncello piccolo; continuo

Ich bin ein guter Hirt (I am a Good Shepherd), BWV 85, is a church cantata by Johann Sebastian Bach. He composed it in Leipzig for the second Sunday after Easter and first performed it on 15 April 1725. He wrote the cantata in the second calendar year of his tenure as Thomaskantor that began in May 1723, but he assigned it to his third cantata cycle.

An unknown librettist included a verse from the Gospel reading and stanzas from two hymns, one from "Ist Gott mein Schild und Helfersmann" by Ernst Christoph Homberg and one from "Der Herr ist mein getreuer Hirt" by Cornelius Becker. The topic is Jesus as the Good Shepherd. Bach structured the cantata in six movements and scored it for four vocal soloists, a four-part choir only in the closing chorale, and a Baroque instrumental ensemble of two oboes, bassoon, strings and basso continuo.

== History, hymns and words ==
Bach composed Ich bin ein guter Hirt for the second Sunday after Easter called Misericordias Domini which fell on 15 May in 1724. He was then in his second year as Thomaskantor, the church music director of Leipzig. In his first twelve months in office, Bach had decided to compose new cantatas for almost all liturgical occasions. These works became known as his first cantata cycle. In his second year in office, Bach composed his chorale cantata cycle, with each cantata for the liturgical occasions based on one Lutheran hymn. Possibly due to the loss of his librettist for the project, Bach ended this series with Wie schön leuchtet der Morgenstern, BWV 1, for Annunciation, performed on 25 March that year, and turned to other cantata types for the following Easter season. He later assigned Ich bin ein guter Hirt to his third cantata cycle.

The prescribed readings for the second Sunday after Easter were from the First Epistle of Peter, Christ as a model (1 Peter 2:21–25), and from the Gospel of John, the Good Shepherd (John 10:11–16).

According to John Eliot Gardiner, the librettist is likely the same as for two preceding cantatas, Bleib bei uns, denn es will Abend werden, BWV 6, and Am Abend aber desselbigen Sabbats, BWV 42, before Christiana Mariana von Ziegler became the poet for the following cantatas of the period. The three cantata texts were probably written for Bach's first year in Leipzig but postponed due to the workload of the first performance of the St John Passion that year. The three cantatas form a sequence on themes from the Gospel of John.

The librettist opened the cantata with the beginning of the Gospel, verse 11: Jesus describing himself as the Good Shepherd. The second movement explains that being a Good Shepherd was realised in the Passion. The thought is commented by the first stanza of Cornelius Becker's 1598 hymn "Der Herr ist mein getreuer Hirt", a paraphrase of Psalm 23. The poet refers in movement 4 to verse 12 of the Gospel, the contrast of the shepherd who is awake to watch over the sheep, whereas the hired servants sleep and neglect them. Movement 5 names love as the shepherd's motivation to care for the sheep and points at the death of Jesus. The cantata ends with the fourth stanza, "Ist Gott mein Schutz und treuer Hirt", of the 1658 hymn "Ist Gott mein Schild und Helfersmann" for which Ernst Christoph Homberg supplied text and melody. All movements are closely connected to the Gospel theme. The sequence of movements is found also in the two cantatas preceding it and in other Bach cantatas, which may also have been written by the same unknown librettist.

Bach led the Thomanerchor in the first performance on 15 April 1725.

== Music ==
=== Scoring and structure ===
Bach structured the cantata in six movements and scored the work for four vocal soloists (soprano (S), alto (A), tenor (T) and bass (B)), a four-part choir only in the closing chorale, and a Baroque instrumental ensemble of two oboes (Ob), bassoon (Fg), two violins (Vl), viola (Va), cello piccolo (Vp) and basso continuo. The duration of the cantata is given as 20 minutes.

In the following table of the movements, the scoring, keys and time signatures are taken from Dürr's standard work Die Kantaten von Johann Sebastian Bach. The continuo, which plays throughout, is not shown.

Movements of Am Abend aber desselbigen Sabbats
No.	Title	Type	Vocal	Winds	Strings	Key	Time
1	Ich bin ein guter Hirt		B	2Ob	2Vl Va	C minor	common time
2	Jesus ist ein guter Hirt	Aria	A		Vp	G minor	common time
3	Der Herr ist mein getreuer Hirt	Chorale	S	2Ob		B♭ major	3/4
4	Wenn die Mietlinge schlafen	Recitative	T		2Vl Va		common time
5	Seht, was die Liebe tut	Aria	T		2Vl Va	E♭ major	9/8
6	Ist Gott mein Schutz und treuer Hirt	Chorale	SATB	2Ob	2Vl Va	C minor	common time

=== Movements ===
==== 1 ====
In the first movement, the bass as the vox Christi sings a line from the Gospel of John, "Ich bin ein guter Hirt, ein guter Hirt läßt sein Leben für die Schafe" (I am a Good Shepherd; a good shepherd gives up his life for his sheep) in two passages framed by instrumental ritornellos. The motif for the first words appears in the ritornello four times. The movement's form is between aria and arioso, with the oboes as obbligato instruments in "a mood of tranquil seriousness", as Klaus Hofmann described. Hans-Joachim Schulze notes that the obbligato two oboes in unison may have been planned for penetrating sharpness.

==== 2 ====
The alto aria, "Jesus ist ein guter Hirt;" (Jesus is a good shepherd;), is accompanied by an obbligato violoncello piccolo. The content is a reflection of the preceding Gospel words. Unusually, the alto sings the full text three times, with only minor variations in motifs and harmonies.

==== 3 ====
The chorale stanza, "Der Herr ist mein getreuer Hirt" (The Lord is my faithful shepherd), is sung by the soprano to the tune of "Allein Gott in der Höh sei Ehr" by Nikolaus Decius, with a slightly ornamented melody, while the two oboes play a theme in the ritornellos which is derived from the first line of the tune.

==== 4 ====
The cantata's only recitative, "Wenn die Mietlinge schlafen, da wachtet dieser Hirt bei seinen Schafen" (When the hired servants sleep, then this Shepherd watches over his sheep), is sung by the tenor as a miniature sermon, accompanied by the strings that play long notes and accent phrases of the text towards the end.

==== 5 ====
The tenor aria, "Seht, was die Liebe tut" (Behold what love does), is in pastorale rhythm, the cantata's only movement to relate to the shepherd theme in this way, while the word "shepherd" is not mentioned. The strings, violins and violas, play in unison in low register. Thus the tenor voice frequently appears as the highest part, beginning with "Seht" (look) three times. Gardiner observed the similarity to an alto aria (movement 60) of the St Matthew Passion, "Sehet, Jesus hat die Hand", both in the theme of "pastoral love emanating from the cross", and in the music, described as "rich, flowing melody and gently rocking rhythm".

==== 6 ====
The closing chorale, "Ist Gott mein Schutz und treuer Hirt" (If God is my Protector and faithful Shepherd), is a four-part setting, repeating that God is the faithful shepherd. The movement is C minor, but Bach ended its seven cadences in a major mode.

== Manuscripts and publication ==
Bach's autograph score of the cantata and a set of parts that Bach had partly revised himself are extant. The cantata was first published in 1872 in the first complete edition of Bach's work, the Bach-Gesellschaft Ausgabe. The volume in question was edited by Wilhelm Rust. In the Neue Bach-Ausgabe, it was published in 1989, edited by Reinmar Emans.

== Recordings ==
The selection is taken from the listing on the Bach Cantatas Website. Instrumental groups playing period instruments in historically informed performances are marked green.

Recordings of Ich bin ein guter Hirt
Title	Conductor / Choir / Orchestra	Soloists	Label	Year	Instr.
Bach: Cantata 85; Cantata 151	Anthon van der Horst De Nederlandse Bachvereniging Amsterdam Kamerorkest	Hélène Ludolph; Wilhelmine Matthès; Tom Brand; Hermann Schey	Telefunken	1957	
J. S. Bach: Kantate BWV 85 Ich bin ein guter Hirt	Karl Ristenpart Chorus of the Conservatory of Sarrebruck Chamber Orchestra of the Saar	soloist from choir; Eva Bornemann; Helmut Kretschmar; Jakob Stämpfli	Saarländischer Rundfunk	1960	
J. S. Bach: Cantatas BWV 6 & BWV 19	Hans Grischkat Stuttgart Choral Society Bach-Orchester Stuttgart	Agnes Giebel; Hetty Plümacher; Werner Hohmann; Bruno Müller	Renaissance	1951	
Les Grandes Cantates de J. S. Bach Vol. 24	Fritz Werner Heinrich-Schütz-Chor Heilbronn Württembergisches Kammerorchester Heilbronn	Hedy Graf; Barbara Scherler; Kurt Huber; Jakob Stämpfli	Erato	1970	
J. S. Bach: Das Kantatenwerk • Complete Cantatas • Les Cantates, Folge / Vol. 7	Nikolaus Harnoncourt Tölzer Knabenchor Concentus Musicus Wien	boy soloist; Paul Esswood; Kurt Equiluz; Ruud van der Meer	Teldec	1977	Period
Die Bach Kantate Vol. 13	Helmuth Rilling Gächinger Kantorei Bach-Collegium Stuttgart	Arleen Augér; Gabriele Schreckenbach; Adalbert Kraus; Walter Heldwein	Hänssler	1981	
Bach Edition Vol. 11 – Cantatas Vol. 2	Pieter Jan Leusink Holland Boys Choir Netherlands Bach Collegium	Ruth Holton; Sytse Buwalda; Nico van der Meel; Bas Ramselaar	Brilliant Classics	1999	Period
Bach Cantatas Vol. 23: Arnstadt/Echternach	John Eliot Gardiner Monteverdi Choir English Baroque Soloists	Katharine Fuge; William Towers; Norbert Meyn; Stephen Varcoe	Soli Deo Gloria	2000	Period
J. S. Bach: Complete Cantatas Vol. 15	Ton Koopman Amsterdam Baroque Orchestra & Choir	Deborah York; Bogna Bartosz; Jörg Dürmüller; Klaus Mertens	Antoine Marchand	2001	Period
J. S. Bach: Cantatas Vol. 39	Masaaki Suzuki Bach Collegium Japan	Carolyn Sampson; Robin Blaze; Gerd Türk; Peter Kooy	BIS	2007	Period
J. S. Bach: Cantatas for the Complete Liturgical Year Vol. 11	Sigiswald Kuijken La Petite Bande	Gerlinde Sämann; Petra Noskaiová; Christoph Genz; Jan van der Crabben	YouTube	2008	Period
