= Unser Mund sei voll Lachens, BWV 110 =

Church cantata by Johann Sebastian Bach

Unser Mund sei voll Lachens
- BWV 110
- Church cantata; Christmas cantata; by J. S. Bach
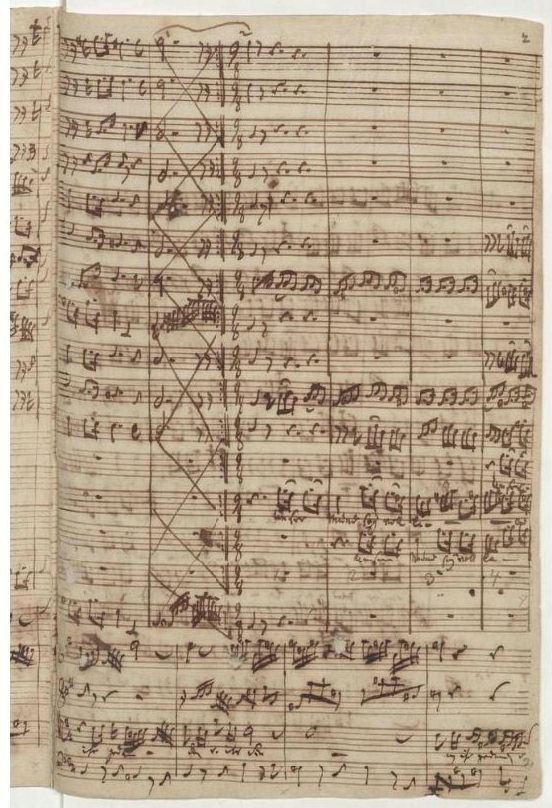
- Page 5 from the cantata's autograph score, with the entrance of the voices in the middle section of the first movement
- Related: Orchestral Suite, BWV 1069; Virga Jesse Floruit of Magnificat, BWV 243a
- Occasion: First Day of Christmas
- Cantata text: Georg Christian Lehms
- Bible text: Psalms 126:2–3; Jeremiah 10:6; Luke 2:14
- Chorale: "Wir Christenleut" by Kaspar Füger
- Performed: 25 December 1725: Leipzig
- Movements: 7
- Vocal: SATB choir and solo
- Instrumental: 3 trumpets; timpani; 2 flauti traversi; 3 oboes (oboe d'amore, oboe da caccia); bassoon; 2 violins; viola; continuo

Unser Mund sei voll Lachens ('May our mouth be full of laughter'), BWV 110, is a church cantata by Johann Sebastian Bach. He composed the Christmas cantata in Leipzig for Christmas Day and first performed it on 25 December 1725.

When Bach wrote the music, he was in his third year as Thomaskantor, the church music director of Leipzig. After months with only a few cantata compositions, he embarked on a set of five cantatas for Christmas occasions. In four of these, he used earlier texts published in 1711 by Georg Christian Lehms. The text for this cantata has no pairs of recitative and arias as is common in Baroque opera and contemporary Bach cantatas. Using an older style, it instead features three biblical quotations – verses from Psalm 126, a verse from the Book of Jeremiah about God's greatness, and the angels' song from the Nativity according to the Gospel of Luke – alternating with arias. The closing chorale is from Kaspar Füger's hymn "Wir Christenleut".

Bach composed the work in seven movements and scored it festively for four vocal soloists, a four-part choir and a Baroque instrumental ensemble with trumpets and timpani, flutes and several kinds of oboe. The outer movements are given to the choir and the full orchestra; the inner movements are chamber music for solo voices and solo instruments. Bach derived the first chorus, which is in the style of a French overture, from the first movement of his fourth Orchestral Suite. He embedded vocal parts in its fast middle section, illustrating the laughter mentioned in the psalm verse. The song of the angels is based on the Christmas interpolation Virga Jesse Floruit from his Magnificat in E♭ major, BWV 243a. He chose obbligato instruments to differentiate the character of the three arias: two flutes with the tenor expressing the "lowly birth", oboe d'amore with the alto, representing God's love, and trumpet, oboes and strings with the bass for his call to sing songs of joy together. Bach led the Thomanerchor in the first performances on Christmas Day in two Leipzig churches.

== History ==
=== Background ===
Bach was appointed Thomaskantor (director of church music) in 1723 in Leipzig. There he was responsible for the music at four churches, and the training and education of the boys singing in the Thomanerchor (the boys' choir in Leipzig). He took office on 30 May 1723, performing his church cantata Die Elenden sollen essen, BWV 75, for the first Sunday after Trinity. In the new position, Bach decided to compose church cantatas for almost all liturgical events for the first twelve months; they became his first cantata cycle. These were for Sundays and feast days of the Christian liturgical year, except for the "silent times" of Advent (before Christmas) and Lent (before Easter), including feasts of saints, of Mary, and several days of celebrating the high holidays. The following year, Bach went on to write a second cantata cycle, now basing each on a Lutheran hymn. In his book Johann Sebastian Bach: The Learned Musician, Christoph Wolff described the endeavour as "a most promising project of great homogeneity, whose scope he was able to define himself".

In 1725, his third year in the post, Bach slowed down his composing and began to perform cantatas by other composers. Until Christmas, cantatas from that year are only extant for four occasions, three Sundays and Reformation Day on 31 October. He was thus able to use the month of November to prepare the cantatas for the Christmas season, and could still take a vacation during Advent, together with his wife, Anna Magdalena, to perform a birthday cantata at the Köthen court where he had worked previously. He seems to have planned to set a complete liturgical year with texts from a cycle of cantata texts by Georg Christian Lehms.

=== Christmas ===
When Bach worked in Leipzig, Christmas, Easter and Pentecost were celebrated for three days, and each day required festive music for church services. On the first day, the cantata was performed in the morning at the Nikolaikirche and in the afternoon in a vespers service at the Thomaskirche. On the second day, a different cantata was performed in the morning at the Thomaskirche and in the afternoon in the Nikolaikirche. On the third day, a third cantata was performed only in the morning in one of the churches. The Bach scholar Hans-Joachim Schulze noted that Bach was also required to serve the Paulinerkirche of the Leipzig University, and therefore a third performance of the cantata there in the late morning of the same day was not impossible.

In 1723, Bach had composed no new Christmas Day cantata, but revived Christen, ätzet diesen Tag, BWV 63, a work dating back possibly to 1713 that sets a text of free poetry without any biblical text or chorale He composed new works for the second and third feast day that year. In his second year, he composed three chorale cantatas for the three feast days, beginning with Gelobet seist du, Jesu Christ, BWV 91.

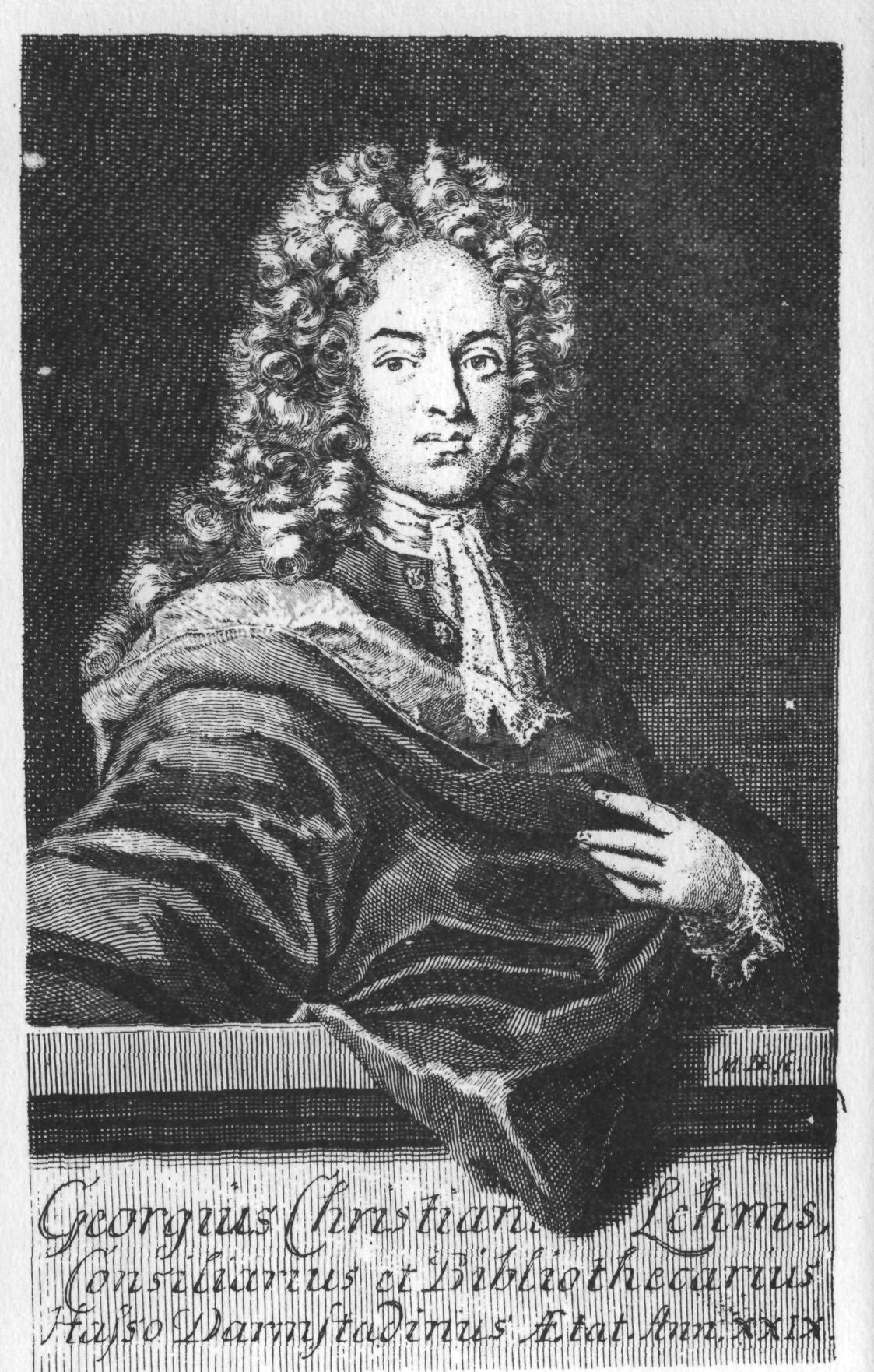
Georg Christian Lehms, the librettist

In 1725, Bach composed cantatas for five occasions of the Christmas season, utilising texts by Lehms. The librettist was librarian and court poet for the Landgrave of Hesse-Darmstadt. He published a collection of Andachten (devotions) for the occasions of the liturgical year in 1711, entitled Gottgefälliges Kirchen-Opffer (Church offering pleasing to God). It is a double annual cycle, providing for all Sundays and church feast days devotions for both the mornings and afternoons. The morning devotions contain biblical quotations, arias and chorales; the afternoon devotions consist of arias and recitatives. Bach set nine texts from the afternoon cycle, some of which he had already used when he worked for the Weimar court; Unser Mund sei voll Lachens is his only cantata text from the morning cycle.

The five cantatas that Bach composed for the 1725/26 Christmas season have more unified texts than the cantatas in the two previous years, four of them to texts from the Lehms collection; only the text for the Sunday cantata was written by Erdmann Neumeister:

- 25 December (Nativity of Jesus): Unser Mund sei voll Lachens, BWV 110
- 26 December (Annunciation to the shepherds): Selig ist der Mann, BWV 57
- 27 December (Adoration of the shepherds): Süßer Trost, mein Jesus kömmt, BWV 151
- 30 December, Sunday after Christmas (Simeon and Anna): Gottlob! nun geht das Jahr zu Ende, BWV 28
- 1 January, New Year's Day (Naming of Jesus): Herr Gott, dich loben wir, BWV 16, BWV 16

Bach's handwriting in the autographs of these five cantatas looks less hurried than for earlier works for the Christmas season. They have been called "the other Christmas Oratorio", comparing to Bach's Christmas Oratorio for the 1734/35 season.

=== Text ===
Two Bible readings were prescribed for Christmas Day, as epistle either "God's mercy appeared" (Titus 2:11–14) or "Unto us a child is born" (Isaiah 9:2–7), and for the Gospel an excerpt from the Nativity, the annunciation to the shepherds and the angels' song (Luke 2:1–14).

The librettist began this text with a quotation of two verses from Psalm 126, which deals with the hope for the delivery of the Israelites from Babylonian captivity. The psalm opens: "When the Lord turned again the captivity of Zion, we were like them that dream.", but Lehms ignored the context and only used the joyful reaction, in the King James Version: "Then was our mouth filled with laughter, and our tongue with singing: then said they among the heathen, The Lord hath done great things for them." (Psalms 126:2–3). The musicologist Walther Vetter assumed in his 1950 book Der Kapellmeister Bach that the change of the Bible wording from conditional to unconditional joy was Bach's intention and work.

The poet included for a recitative a verse from the Book of Jeremiah, praising God's greatness (Jeremiah 10:6), and he quoted from the Christmas story the singing of the angels (Luke 2:14). Each of the three biblical quotations is followed by an aria; the second reflects a thought from Psalm 8:4, "What is man, that thou art mindful of him? and the son of man, that thou visitest him?". The closing chorale is the fifth stanza of Caspar Füger's hymn "Wir Christenleut" ('We Christian people').

=== Performances ===
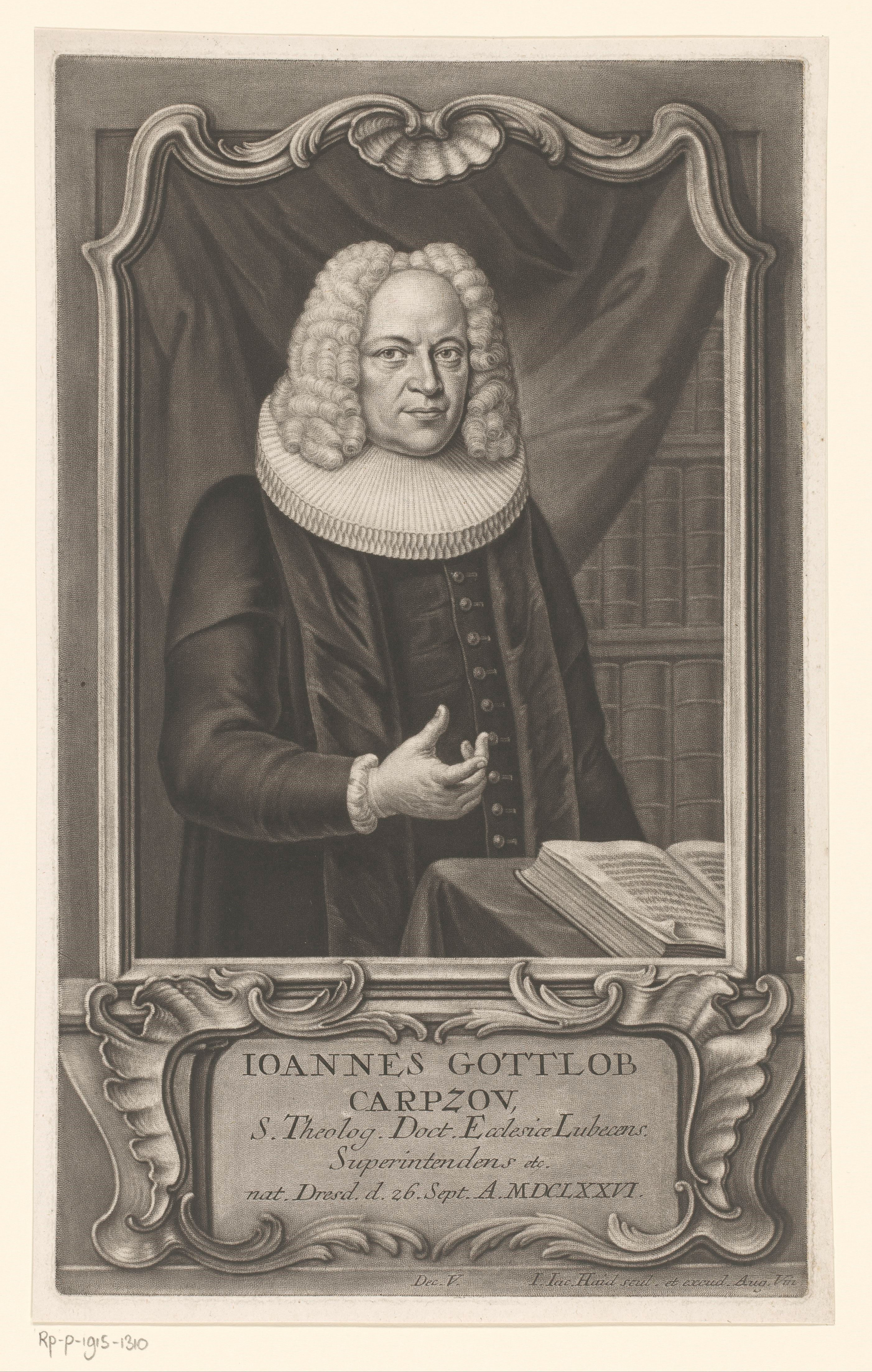
Johann Gottlob Carpzov, pastor in Leipzig

Bach led the Thomanerchor in the first performance in the morning of Christmas Day in the Nikolaikirche, with a sermon by Salomon Deyling, and repeated it in a vespers service at the Thomaskirche, with a sermon by Johann Gottlob Carpzov. He performed the cantata at least one more time between 1728 and 1731.

== Music ==
=== Structure and scoring ===
Bach structured the cantata in seven movements. The outer movements—the opening chorus and the closing chorale—are sung by the choir, and frame a sequence of arias, a recitative and a duet. The work is scored for four vocal soloists (soprano (S), alto (A), tenor (T), bass (B)), a four-part choir and a festive Baroque instrumental ensemble of three trumpets (Tr) and timpani (Ti), two flauti traversi (Ft), three oboes (Ob) (also oboe d'amore (Oa) and oboe da caccia (Oc)), two violins (Vl), viola (Va), and basso continuo including bassoon (Fg). The heading of the original parts reads: "J.J. Feria 1 Nativitatis Xsti. Concerto. a 3 Trombe, Tamburi. 3 Hautb. / Baßon. 2 Violini e Viola, 4 Voci è Continuo.", which means "Jesus help. First feast day of the birth of Christ. Concerto for 3 trumpets, timpani, 3 oboes, bassoon, 2 violins and viola, 4 voices and continuo". Dürr gave the duration as 27 minutes.

In the following table, the scoring follows the Neue Bach-Ausgabe. The keys and time signatures are taken from Alfred Dürr's Die Kantaten von Johann Sebastian Bach using the symbols for common time (4/4) and alla breve (2/2). The continuo, playing throughout, is not shown.

Movements of Unser Mund sei voll Lachens
No.	Title	Text	Type	Vocal	Winds	Strings	Key	Time
1	Unser Mund sei voll Lachens	Psalm	Chorus	SATB	3Tr Ti 2Ft 3Ob Fg	2Vl Va	D major	9/8
2	Ihr Gedanken und ihr Sinnen	Lehms	Aria	T	2Ft		B minor	common time
3	Dir, Herr, ist niemand gleich	Jeremiah	Recitative	B		2Vl Va		common time
4	Ach Herr! was ist ein Menschenkind	Lehms	Aria	A	Oa		F♯ minor	3/4
5	Ehre sei Gott in der Höhe	Luke	Aria (Duet)	S T			A major	12/8
6	Wacht auf, ihr Adern und ihr Glieder	Lehms	Aria	B	Tr 2Ob Oc	2Vl Va	D major	common time
7	Alleluja! Gelobt sei Gott	Füger	Chorale	SATB	Tr 2Ft 2Ob Oc	2Vl Va	B minor	common time

=== Movements ===
Performers: Pforzheim Chamber Orchestra (with Adolf Scherbaum (trumpet)), Windsbacher Knabenchor, Herrad Wehrung (soprano), Emmy Lisken (alto), Georg Jelden (tenor), Jakob Stämpfli (bass), Hans Thamm (conductor), July 1961

Between 1723 and 1725, Bach set mostly contemporary poetry to music in the cantatas of his first two cycles, and often composed pairs of recitative and aria, a common practice in Baroque opera. The text for Unser Mund sei voll Lachens is in an older format, with biblical texts alternating with arias. Bach followed the text style, using different musical forms for the three biblical quotations. The opening chorus on psalm verses is an adaptation of his overture to his fourth Orchestral Suite in D major, BWV 1069. The duet "Ehre sei Gott in der Höhe" is based on the Christmas interpolation Virga Jesse floruit from his 1723 Magnificat, first performed for his first Christmas in Leipzig.

=== 1 ===
The opening chorus "Unser Mund sei voll Lachens" ('May our mouth be full of laughter') calls for all instruments to perform. The text "concludes with acknowledgement that the Lord has achieved great things for his people". Bach chose the form of a French overture, often played upon the arrival of the king to a performance, which seemed suitable to greet the King of Heaven. He used a French overture in five other cantatas, all for festive occasions: Nun komm, der Heiden Heiland, BWV 61, written in 1714 for the first Sunday in Advent; Preise, Jerusalem, den Herrn, BWV 119, written in 1723 for the inauguration of the Leipzig town council; Höchsterwünschtes Freudenfest, BWV 194, written for the consecration of organ and church in Störmthal in November 1723; O Ewigkeit, du Donnerwort, BWV 20, written in 1724 for the first Sunday after Trinity Sunday and thus beginning Bach's second cantata cycle; and the 1734 cantata for general use In allen meinen Taten, BWV 97.

Bach based the music on the overture to an early version of his fourth Orchestral Suite, Bach's authorship of this Suite was doubted until the cantata was rediscovered in 1876. The early version on which he based the cantata movement probably featured no trumpets, no timpani and no third oboe. Bach added these instruments for the celebratory Christmas occasion and retained them for the final 1730 version of the suite. He also added flutes to the cantata and embedded the voices in the fast middle section.

According to Dürr, the laughter mentioned in the text is "made quite graphically audible" in this middle section.

In program notes for the Bach Choir of Bethlehem, Carol Traupman-Carr wrote that "when the voices enter, there is a clear sense of laughter in Bach's setting. We can see how easily [he] achieves this: each of the voices enters in imitation with the same text, but eventually all arrive simultaneously on a syllable with an "a" vowel. Bach writes numerous melismas on this "ah" sound, and with the lilting rhythm, the sound of laughter is genuinely achieved."

Vetter wrote about this movement in 1950, at a time when Bach's parody methods were still seen critically, that the parody was not an easy way to reuse music also suitable for Christmas: he thought that Bach rounded off the orchestral work, giving it a fuller meaning through the vocal parts, not just by adding text but through the substance of the choral setting. Vetter concluded: "The solidity of Bach's musicianship, the depth and sharpness of his mind, the absolute naturalness of his faith, averse to all speculation, enable a combination of sacred and secular works that cannot be offensive to either the unprejudiced pious or the unbiased musical person."

For a later performance, Bach added ripieno markings for some vocal sections, requesting additional singers for these sections. It provided greater variety within the Baroque terraced dynamic. According to Jos van Veldhoven, the conductor of the Netherlands Bach Society, the score is one of few where Bach marked ripieno himself, which he may have used more often without marking it. John Eliot Gardiner, who conducted the Bach Cantata Pilgrimage in 2000, notes the first movement's "marvellous rendition of laughter-in-music" and "innate elegance and lightness of touch".

=== 2 ===
"Ihr Gedanken und ihr Sinnen" ('You thoughts and musings') is a tenor aria accompanied by two transverse flutes. Dürr interprets the choice of flute as a symbol for the "lowly birth". The text reflects that by God's assumption of human life, believers are made "children of heaven" in spite of "hell and Satan". The contemplative music is interwoven with flute motifs.

=== 3 ===
The bass recitative "Dir, Herr, ist niemand gleich" ('There is no one like You, Lord'), is taken from Jeremiah. It modulates from F minor to A major. The expressive line of the bass voice is accompanied by strings which add "upward-pointing gestures". They have been interpreted as "an allusion to God".

=== 4 ===
"Ach Herr, was ist ein Menschenkind" ('Ah, Lord, what is a human being') is an alto aria accompanied by a solo oboe d'amore. It is in two parts; the first deals with the idea of man in a sinful condition, and the second reflects redemption. The key changes to major, with new musical material. Alluding to a da capo aria, the instrumental beginning of the movement is repeated.

The Bach scholar Klaus Hofmann and Veldhoven both relate the choice of the oboe d'amore to the essential answer of the singer's question "Why do you do all this for man?": "Aus Liebe" ('through love'). Writing for the Bach Choir of Bethlehem, Carol Traupman-Carr observed that this text phrase and the combination of a woman's voice with oboes d'amore occurs in the aria "Aus Liebe will mein Heiland sterben" from Bach's St Matthew Passion, concluding that Bach found the combination pleasing, possibly due to the "intimate, warm sound" they create together.

=== 5 ===
The duet "Ehre sei Gott in der Höhe" '(Glory to God in the highest'), combines two high voices over a simple continuo accompaniment, singing of God's glory in the highest and peace on Earth. The music is based on the Virga Jesse floruit ('The branch of Jesse flowered'), one of the Christmas interpolations for Bach's Magnificat. Bach changed the vocal lines to suit the different text but retained the "essentially lyrical character". Wolff notes that Bach changes from a triple metre at the beginning for the heavenly sphere ('in the highest') to common time for the following part ('on Earth'), as he would when setting the same text in Latin in the Gloria of his Mass in B minor. Gardiner writes that "goodwill towards men" is expressed in pastoral style, with the voices in parallels of tenths. Melismas that stood for flowering in the model, express jubilation in the cantata.

The text, which has often been set to music with trumpets and drums, appears here in a chamber music setting matching the previous inner movements.

=== 6 ===
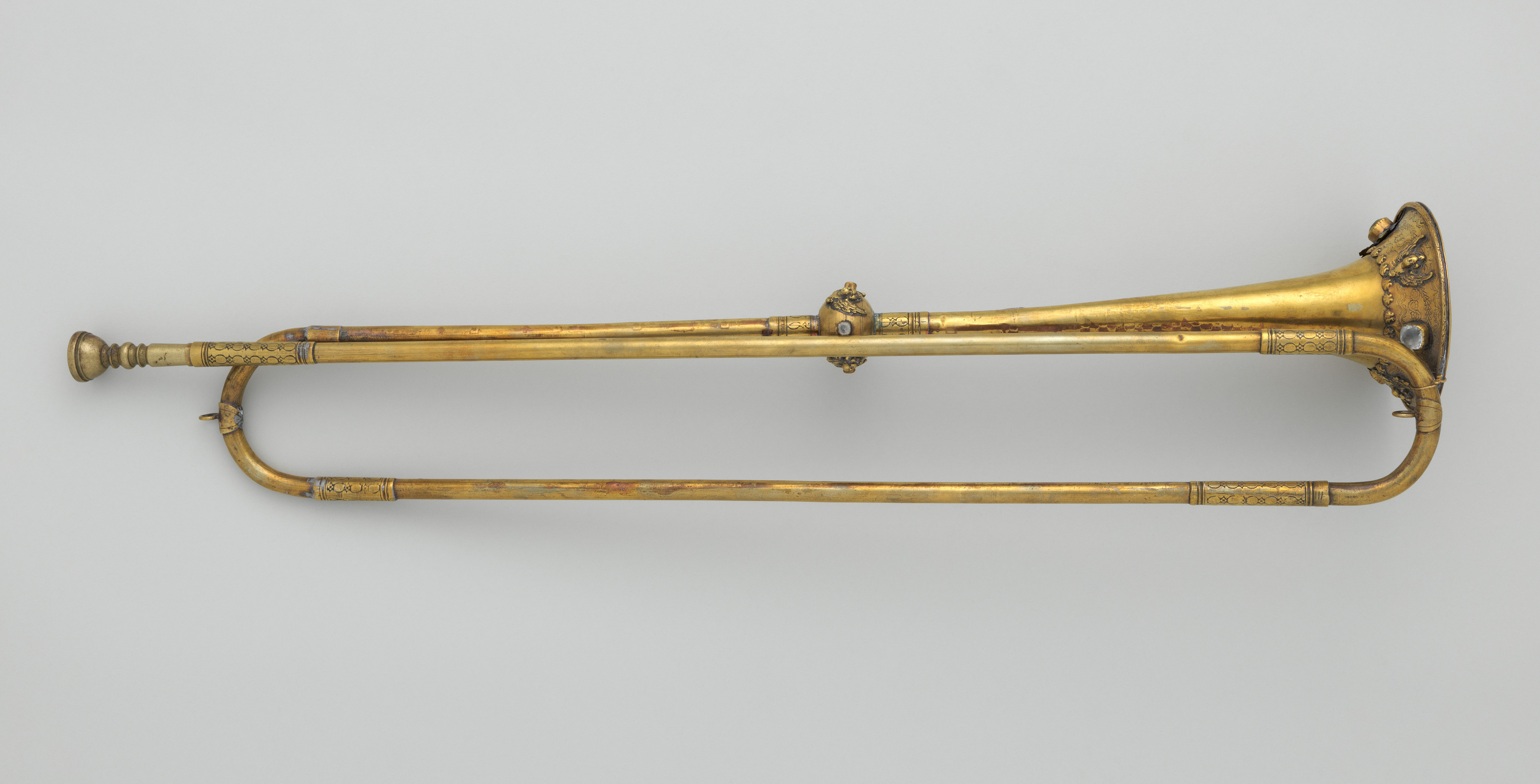
Natural trumpet

The bass aria "Wacht auf, ihr Adern und ihr Glieder" ('Awaken, veins and limbs'), is a final call to wake up and join the praise of the angels. Trumpet and oboe add to the musical energy. The oboes double the strings or rest, for more dynamic effect. Virtuoso passages in the trumpet are reminiscent of the first movement, returning to its celebratory mood. The first triad call of the trumpet is of martial character, and imitated by the voice. When the text refers to the strings, the winds rest. The aria is of similar character as "Großer Herr, o starker König" ('Mighty Lord and Great King') from Part I of Bach's 1734 Christmas Oratorio.

=== 7 ===
The closing chorale "Alleluja! Gelobt sei Gott" ('Alleluia! Praise be to God') is a four-part setting of the tune by an anonymous composer.

Bach later set the same tune again as "Seid froh, dieweil" ('Meanwhile, be happy'), to close Part III of his Christmas Oratorio.

== Manuscripts and publication ==
The manuscripts of both the score and parts survive. Some Bach scholars believed that the cantata was written in 1734 for the end of the War of the Polish Succession, but the discovery of the printed text for that event showed that it was not related.

The first critical edition of the cantata, edited by Wilhelm Rust, was published by the Bach Gesellschaft in 1876 as part of its complete edition of Bach's works. In the Neue Bach-Ausgabe, the second edition of Bach's works, the cantata was published in 1957, edited by Dürr.

Carus published a critical edition in German and English as part of its Stuttgarter Bach-Ausgaben in 2017, edited by Karin Wollschläger. In the 21st century, Bach Digital published high-resolution facsimile images of the manuscript parts from the first quarter of the 18th century.

== Recordings ==
Unser Mund sei voll Lachens has mainly been recorded within cycles of Bach's church cantatas. Fritz Werner and the Heinrich-Schütz-Chor Heilbronn recording the cantata in a series of more than 50 of Bach's works. The Windsbacher Knabenchor, a boys' choir like the Thomanerchor that Bach had in mind, recorded the work in 1961 and released it with Wer Dank opfert, der preiset mich, BWV 17.

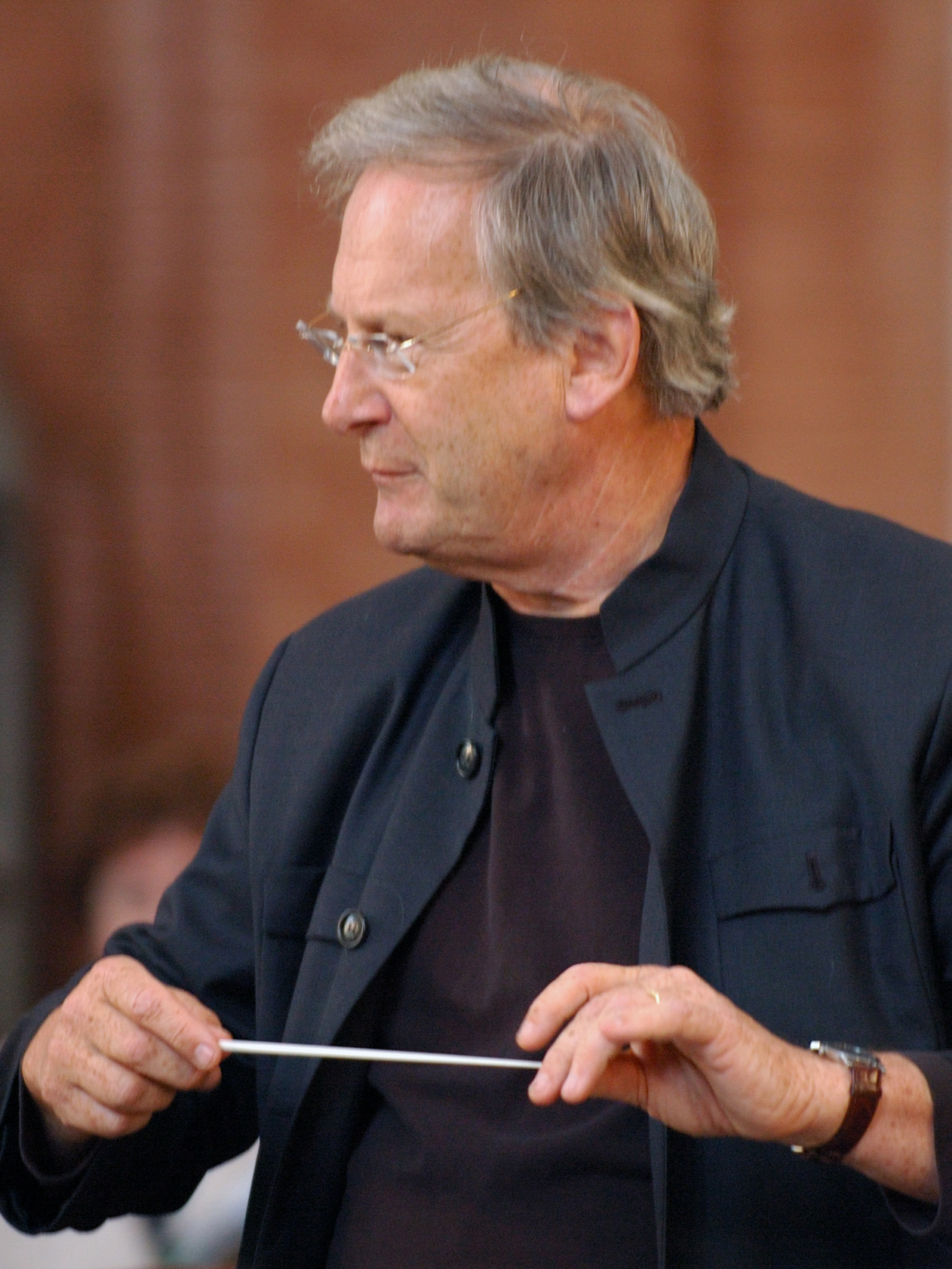
John Eliot Gardiner, who conducted the Bach Cantata Pilgrimage, in 2007

A complete cycle undertaken by Nikolaus Harnoncourt and Gustav Leonhardt was the first to follow the principles of historically informed performance, using period instruments and playing techniques, and boys for the upper voices. This project, J. S. Bach – Das Kantatenwerk, recorded the cantata in 1979 with Harnoncourt conducting. A second cycle was conducted around the same time by Helmuth Rilling and the Gächinger Kantorei, with traditional instruments and women singing solo and in the choir; they recorded the cantata in 1974.

Gardiner conducted the Bach Cantata Pilgrimage in 2000, performing Bach's cantatas on the liturgical day they were written for in churches throughout Europe and New York City; he chose this cantata to end one of three Christmas concerts concluding the endeavour of a full year. A review from The Guardian of its recording at St. Bartholomew's Church noted: "They are perhaps the most exhilarating performances to be issued so far in Gardiner's cantata edition: bracing, joyous, always superbly sung and played." Masaaki Suzuki recorded it in his cycle with the Bach Collegium Japan in 2009, together with the other two works for Christmas 1725. The music critic Peter Bright acknowledged a consistently sublime performance in movements of chamber music character throughout their cycle, but missed "an element of excitement and enthusiasm" in the opening movement. Jos van Veldhoven and Netherlands Bach Society combined the cantata, as part of their project to record all the Bach church cantatas, with Bach's Magnificat in 2010. A reviewer described the first movement as "one of Bach's signature infectious, exuberant, extended choruses" and noted the transparent sound with good structure and balance even in full orchestral passages and beautiful instrumental solos.

On the occasion of the cantata's tercentenary, the Thomanerchor conducted by Thomaskantor Andreas Reize included it in their annual concert of Bach's Christmas Oratorio at the Thomaskirche on 14 December 2025, aired on Christmas Eve, 24 December 2025.

The following table is a selection from Bach Cantatas website, where 33 recordings are listed as of 2025. Instrumental groups playing period instruments in historically informed performances are marked by green background under the header "Instr.".

Recordings of Unser Mund sei voll Lachens
Title	Conductor / Choir / Orchestra	Soloists	Label	Year	Instr.
J. S. Bach: Kantaten BWV 21, 110 (Ramin Edition Vol. 1)	Günther Ramin Thomanerchor Gewandhausorchester	boy soloist of the Thomanerchor; Gertrud Birmele; Lotte Wolf-Matthäus; Gert Lutze; Friedrich Härtel; Diethard Hellmann (organ); Karl Richter (harpsichord)	Fidelio	1947	
J. S. Bach: Kantate 110 und 17	Hans Thamm Windsbacher Knabenchor Pforzheim Chamber Orchestra	boy soloist of the Thomanerchor; Herrad Wehrung; Emmy Lisken; Georg Jelden; Jakob Stämpfli	Cantate	1961	
Les Grandes Cantates de J. S. Bach Vol. 11	Fritz Werner Heinrich-Schütz-Chor Heilbronn Pforzheim Chamber Orchestra	Friederike Sailer; Claudia Hellmann; Helmut Krebs; Erich Wenk	Erato	1961	
J. S. Bach: Cantata BWV 110 & Magnificat BWV 243	Gerhard Schmidt-Gaden Tölzer Knabenchor Collegium Aureum	Peter Hinterreiter; Andreas Stein; Theo Altmeyer; Siegmund Nimsgern	Deutsche Harmonia Mundi	1972	
Die Bach Kantate Vol. 62	Helmuth Rilling Gächinger Kantorei Bach-Collegium Stuttgart	Kathrin Graf; Helrun Gardow; Aldo Baldin; Wolfgang Schöne	Hänssler	1974	
J. S. Bach: Das Kantatenwerk • Complete Cantatas • Les Cantates, Folge / Vol. 27 – BWV 107-110	Nikolaus Harnoncourt Tölzer Knabenchor Concentus Musicus Wien	soloist of the Tölzer Knabenchor; Paul Esswood; Kurt Equiluz; Siegfried Lorenz	Teldec	1979	Period
Bach Kantaten BWV 110, BWV 40, BWV 71	Hans-Joachim Rotzsch Thomanerchor Neues Bachisches Collegium Musicum	Arleen Auger; Ortrun Wenkel; Peter Schreier; Siegfried Lorenz	Berlin Classics	1982	
J. S. Bach: Cantates de Nöel	Philippe Herreweghe Collegium Vocale Gent	Vasiljka Jezovšek; Sarah Connolly; Mark Padmore; Peter Kooy	Harmonia Mundi France	1995	Period
Bach Cantatas Vol. 14: New York / Christmas Cantatas	John Eliot Gardiner Monteverdi Choir English Baroque Soloists	Joanne Lunn; William Towers; James Gilchrist; Peter Harvey	Soli Deo Gloria	2000	Period
Bach Edition Vol. 14 – Cantatas Vol. 7	Pieter Jan Leusink Holland Boys Choir Netherlands Bach Collegium	Ruth Holton; Sytse Buwalda; Knut Schoch; Bas Ramselaar	Brilliant Classics	2000	Period
J. S. Bach: Complete Cantatas Vol. 15	Ton Koopman Amsterdam Baroque Orchestra & Choir	Sandrine Piau; Bogna Bartosz; Paul Agnew; Klaus Mertens	Antoine Marchand	2001	Period
J. S. Bach: Cantatas Vol. 43 – BWV 57, 110, 151	Masaaki Suzuki Bach Collegium Japan	Hana Blažíková; Robin Blaze; Gerd Türk; Peter Kooy	BIS	2008	Period
J. S. Bach: Kantate BWV 110 "Unser Mund sei voll Lachens"	Rudolf Lutz Vocal ensemble of Schola Seconda Pratica Schola Seconda Pratica	Gerlinde Sämann; Alex Potter; Bernhard Berchthold; Stephan MacLeod	Gallus Media	2012	Period
J. S. Bach: Magnificat, Unser Mund sei voll Lachens	Jos van Veldhoven Netherlands Bach Society	Dorothee Mields; William Towers; Charles Daniels; Stephan MacLeod	Channel Classics Records	2010	Period
