= Darzu ist erschienen der Sohn Gottes, BWV 40 =

Church cantata by Johann Sebastian Bach

Darzu ist erschienen der Sohn Gottes
- BWV 40
- Christmas cantata by J. S. Bach
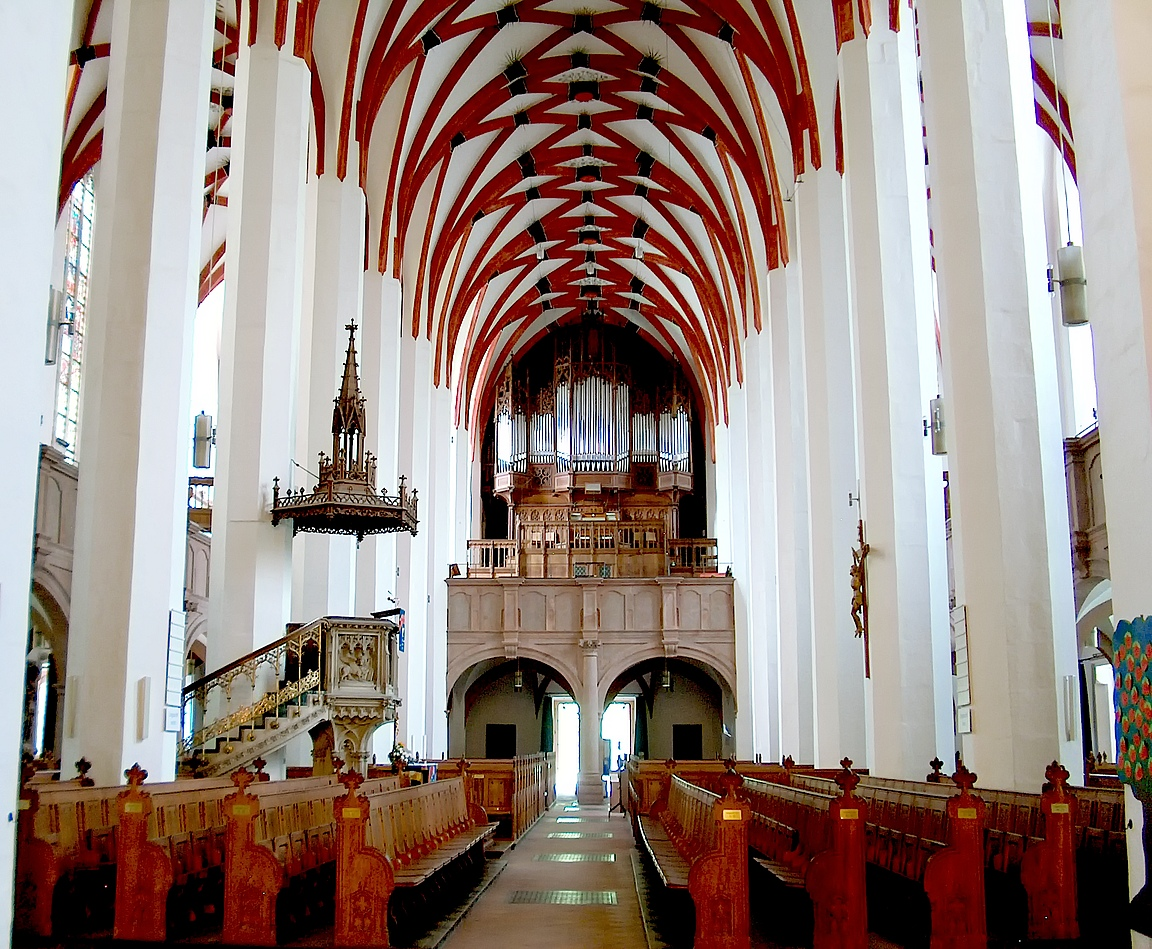
- Thomaskirche, Leipzig
- Related: basis for Missa, BWV 233
- Occasion: Second Day of Christmas
- Bible text: 1 John 3:8
- Performed: 26 December 1723: Leipzig
- Movements: 8
- Vocal: SATB choir; solo: alto, tenor and bass
- Instrumental: 2 horns; 2 oboes; 2 violins; viola; continuo

Darzu ist erschienen der Sohn Gottes (For this the Son of God appeared), BWV 40, is a church cantata by Johann Sebastian Bach. He composed it in 1723, his first year in Leipzig, for the Second Day of Christmas, and first performed it on 26 December that year in both main churches, Thomaskirche and Nikolaikirche. It was the first Christmas cantata Bach composed for Leipzig. The title of the cantata also appears in more modern German as Dazu ist erschienen der Sohn Gottes.

The theme of the work is Jesus as the conqueror of the works of the devil, who is frequently mentioned as the serpent. The music is festively scored, using two horns, similar to Part IV of Bach's later Christmas Oratorio. The text by an unknown poet is organised in eight movements, beginning with a choral movement on the biblical text, followed by a sequence of recitatives and arias which is structured as three stanzas from three different hymns. Only two of these hymns are Christmas carols.

Bach used the opening chorus for the concluding Cum Sancto Spiritu in his 1738 Missa in F major, BWV 233.

== History ==
Bach composed the cantata in his first year in Leipzig, for the Second Day of Christmas. On this day Leipzig celebrated Christmas and Saint Stephen's Day in alternating years, with different readings. In 1723, Saint Stephen's Day was remembered, with the prescribed readings for the feast day from the Acts of the Apostles, the Martyrdom of Stephen (Acts 6:8–7,22, Acts 7:51–59), and from the Gospel of Matthew, Jerusalem killing her prophets (Matthew 23:35–39). The cantata text by an unknown author is not related to the martyrdom, but generally reflects Jesus as the conqueror of sin and the works of the devil. The text quotes the Bible in movement 1, a verse from the First Epistle of John (1 John 3:8). The contemporary poetry alludes to the Bible several times. Movement 2 is based on the Gospel of John (John 1:14). Movement 5 reflects the creation narrative (Genesis 3:15); the image of the serpent is also used in movements 4 and 6. Movement 7 finally picks up a line from the day's Gospel, verse 37, "how often would I have gathered thy children together, even as a hen gathereth her chickens under her wings".

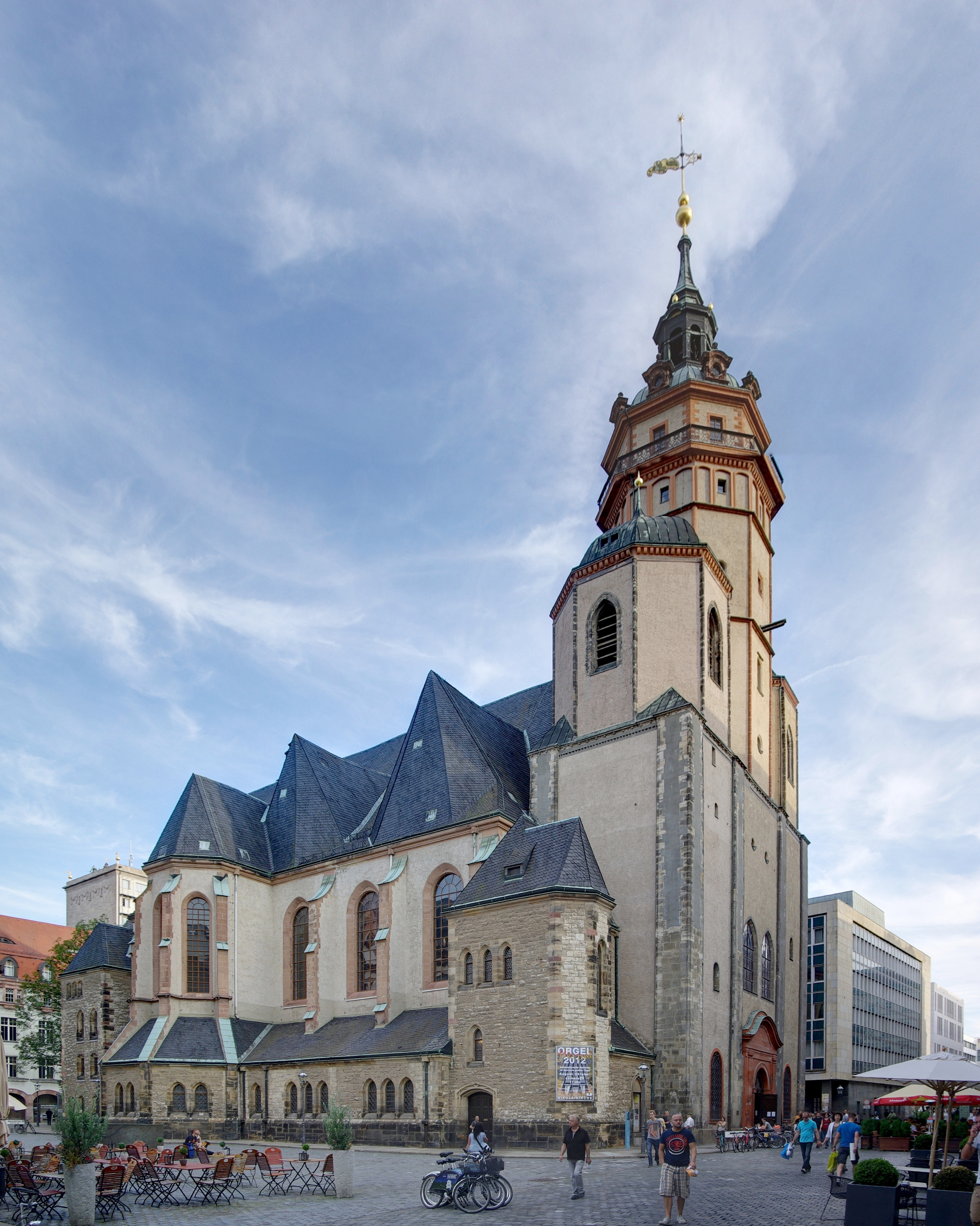
Nikolaikirche, Leipzig, 2012

No fewer than three chorale stanzas from three different hymns are part of the structure: movement 3 is stanza 3 from Kaspar Füger's "Wir Christenleut" (1592); movement 6 is stanza 2 from Paul Gerhardt's "Schwing dich auf zu deinem Gott" (1648); and the closing chorale is the fourth (final) stanza from Christian Keymann's "Freuet euch, ihr Christen alle" (1646). This is unusual; many of Bach's cantatas include only one chorale stanza for a conclusion, and the cantata performed a day before, Christen, ätzet diesen Tag, BWV 63, an early work composed in Weimar, contained no chorale at all. During the 1723 Christmas season, Bach used the structural device of three chorale stanzas, otherwise rare in his cantatas, twice more, in Sehet, welch eine Liebe hat uns der Vater erzeiget, BWV 64, and in Schau, lieber Gott, wie meine Feind, BWV 153. He used the structuring of major works in scenes which are closed by chorale later in his Passions and in his Christmas Oratorio. In this cantata, the first insertion is from a hymn that Bach would later use at the end of Part III of his Christmas Oratorio, sung to the earlier melody (1589) by an anonymous composer. The second insertion is not from a Christmas hymn, but its addressing the "alte Schlange" (old serpent) matches the context. It is sung to a melody possibly composed by Friedrich Funcke. The closing chorale is sung to a melody by Andreas Hammerschmidt, published in his collection Vierter Theill Musicalischer Andachten (Fourth part of musical meditations) in Freiberg, Saxony (1646).

The cantata was the first Christmas cantata composed for Leipzig. Bach first performed it on 26 December 1723, and once more, in either 1746 or 1747. For the Christmas season of 1723, from the First Day of Christmas to Epiphany, Bach had performed a program of six cantatas, five of them new compositions, and two major other choral works:

- 25 December
  - Main service: Christen, ätzet diesen Tag, BWV 63 and a new Sanctus in D major, BWV 238
  - vespers service, BWV 63 and the Magnificat in E-flat major, BWV 243a
- 26 December: this cantata
- 27 December: Sehet, welch eine Liebe hat uns der Vater erzeiget, BWV 64
- 1 January: Singet dem Herrn ein neues Lied, BWV 190
- 2 January: Schau, lieber Gott, wie meine Feind, BWV 153
- 6 January: Sie werden aus Saba alle kommen, BWV 65

The cantatas were performed twice on the principal feast days, in the main service, alternating in one of the two major churches of Leipzig Thomaskirche and Nikolaikirche, and in the vespers service in the other.

Bach parodied the first movement of this cantata for the Cum Sancto Spiritu fugue in his 1738 Missa in F major, BWV 233.

== Scoring and structure ==
For the festive occasion, the cantata is scored for three vocal soloists—alto, tenor and bass—a four-part choir, two horns (corno da caccia), two oboes, two violins, viola and basso continuo. Bach later used a similar scoring in Part IV of his Christmas Oratorio, to be performed on New Year's Day.

The cantata consists of eight movements:

Movements of Darzu ist erschienen der Sohn Gottes, BWV 40
No.	Title	Type	Vocal	Winds	Strings	Brass	Key	Time
1	Darzu ist erschienen der Sohn Gottes	Chorus	SATB	2Ob	2Vl Va Bc	2Hrn	F major	common time
2	Das Wort ward Fleisch	Recitative	Tenor		Bc			common time
3	Die Sünd macht Leid	Chorale	SATB	1Ob (col Soprano), 1 Ob (coll'Alto)	1Vl (col Soprano), 1Vl (coll'Alto), Va (col Tenore), Bc	1Hrn (col Soprano)	G minor	common time
4	Höllische Schlange, wird dir nicht bange?	Aria	Bass	2Ob	2Vl, Va, Bc		D minor	3/8
5	Die Schlange, so im Paradies	Recitative	Alto		2Vl, Va, Bc			common time
6	Schüttle deinen Kopf und sprich	Chorale	SATB	1Ob (col Soprano), 1Ob (coll'Alto)	1Vl (col Soprano), 1Vl (coll'Alto), Va (col Tenor), Bc	1Hrn (col Soprano)	D minor	common time
7	Christenkinder, freuet euch!	Aria	Tenor	2Ob	Bc	2Hrn	F major	12/8
8	Jesu, nimm dich deiner Glieder	Chorale	SATB	1Ob (col Soprano), 1Ob (coll'Alto)	1Vl (col Soprano), 1Vl (coll'Alto), Va (col Tenore), Bc	1Hrn (col Soprano)	F minor	common time

== Music ==
According to musicologist Julian Mincham, the cantata has three sections, each concluded by a chorale:

- Chorus, recitative, chorale – "Christ's purpose in a world of sin"
- Aria, recitative, chorale – "Christ's actions in dispelling Satan"
- Aria, chorale – "consequential Christian delight"

Bach used material from the chorales in his own composition, for example deriving the first horn motif from the beginning of the chorale tune of the first chorale. This suggests that he had chosen the structure before he began the composition.

The opening chorus in F major is a setting of the short text "Dazu ist erschienen der Sohn Gottes, daß er die Werke des Teufels zerstöre." (For this the Son of God appeared, that he might destroy the works of the Devil.) Klaus Hofmann notes: "This work of destruction is portrayed in the chorus by repeated percussive notes and extended coloratura, but all these illustrative elements are subordinated to a festive Christmas spirit". The horns open the ritornello with a short signal-like motif that is picked up by the oboes and the strings. The movement resembles a prelude and fugue, because the text is first presented in homophony to a repeat of the beginning of the ritornello, then repeated as a fugue, and finally repeated in madrigal style similar to the first section.

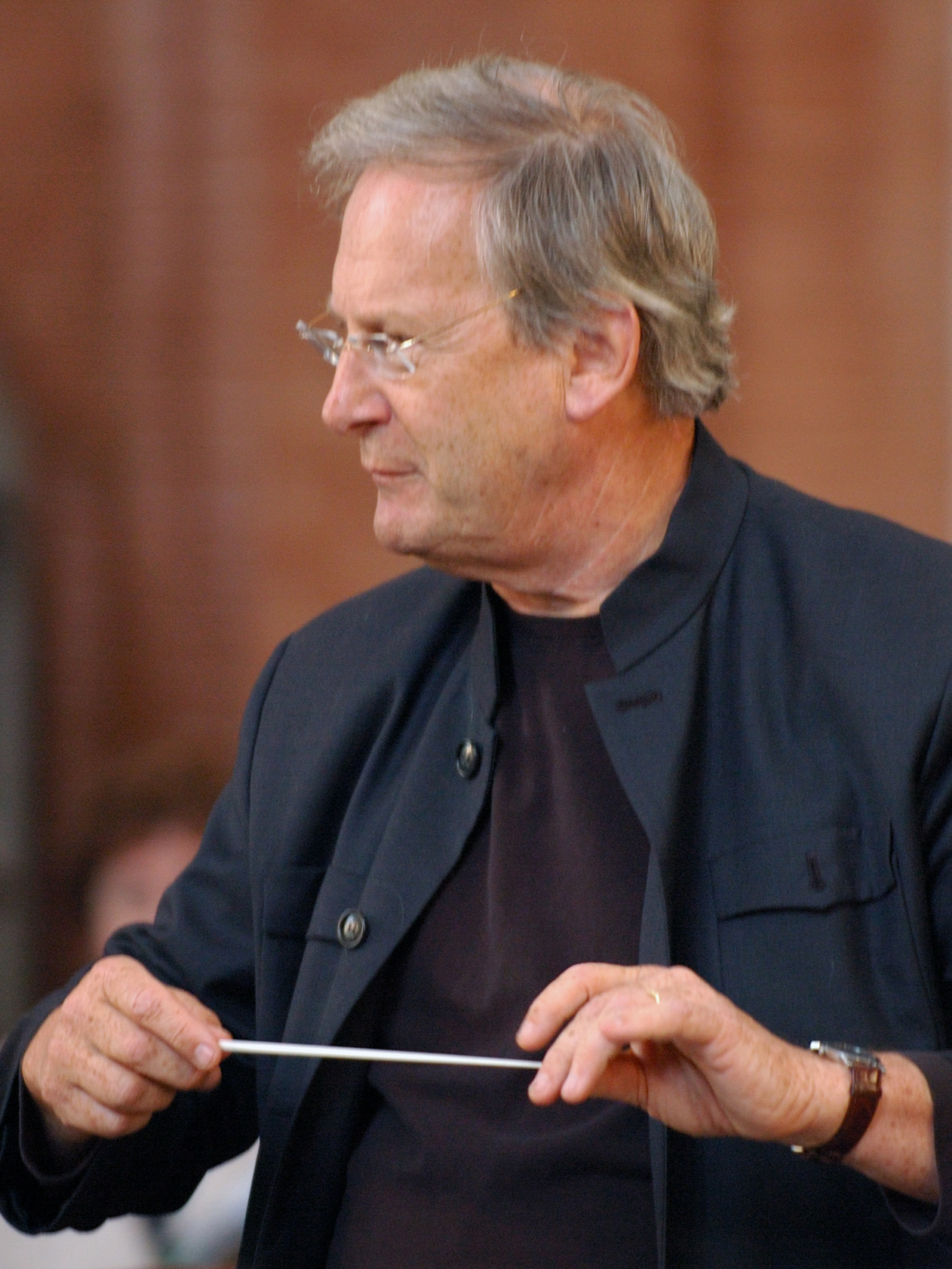
John Eliot Gardiner, 2007

John Eliot Gardiner, who conducted this and other Christmas cantatas during the Bach Cantata Pilgrimage with the Monteverdi Choir in 2000, compares the movement's style to the stilo concitato (excited style) of Claudio Monteverdi and notes its "vigorous endorsement to the military campaign against sin and the devil instituted with Jesus' birth". The text speaking of the "works of the devil" is rendered on repeated notes both in the prelude section as in the fugue section; the destruction is pictured in a twisted, almost snake-like, coloraturas in both sections, but the text "Darzu ist erschienen der Sohn Gottes" is graced by a new calm theme that is introduced by the tenor, followed by bass, soprano and alto, only accompanied by the continuo. Then the theme contrasts with the two other elements depicting the works of the devil and destruction; it shines almost throughout the fugue.

The short secco recitative, sung by the tenor, the typical voice for Evangelist narration, delivers the message "Das Wort ward Fleisch und wohnet in der Welt" (The word became flesh and lived in the world). The chorale, set for four parts, returns to the thought of sin, "Die Sünd macht Leid" (Sin makes suffering). The bass line rises to affirm the last line "Wer ist, der uns als Christen kann verdammen?" (Who could condemn us as Christians?).

The bass aria "Höllische Schlange, wird dir nicht bange?" (Hellish serpent, are you not afraid) is accompanied by oboes and strings. Hofmann describes it as a "wide-ranging, operatic bass solo, triumphant about the 'hellish snake'". The accompagnato recitative "Die Schlange, so im Paradies" (The serpent that in Paradise) explains that sin has been redeemed. The second chorale "Schüttle deinen Kopf und sprich" (Shake your head and say) is also a four-part setting. The vivid bass line illustrates the crushing of the serpent's head.

The tenor aria "Christenkinder, freuet euch!" (Christian children, rejoice!) is accompanied by both horns and oboes and stresses the words "freuet" (be glad) by extended coloraturas and "erschrecken" (terrify) by sudden rests. It reflects the joyful mood of the opening chorus. The cantata is closed by "Jesu, nimm dich deiner Glieder" (Jesu, take to Yourself Your members), the third four-part chorale, asking Jesus for further support in the new year. For several passages, the bass line is moving to illustrate joy and bliss. The harmonisation begins in F minor, changes several times according to the words and reaches F major on the final word "Genadensonne" (Sun of mercy).

== Recordings ==
The entries are taken from the listing on the Bach Cantatas Website. Ensemble with period instruments in historically informed performance are marked by green background.

Recordings of Darzu ist erschienen der Sohn Gottes
Title	Conductor / Choir / Orchestra	Soloists	Label	Year	Orch. type
Les Grandes Cantates de J. S. Bach Vol. 20	Fritz Werner Heinrich-Schütz-Chor Heilbronn Pforzheim Chamber Orchestra	Claudia Hellmann; Georg Jelden; Jakob Stämpfli	Erato	1964	
Die Bach Kantate Vol. 62	Helmuth Rilling Figuralchor der Gedächtniskirche Stuttgart Bach-Collegium Stuttgart	Verena Gohl; Adalbert Kraus; Siegmund Nimsgern	Hänssler	1970	
J. S. Bach: Das Kantatenwerk • Complete Cantatas • Les Cantates, Folge / Vol. 3	Gustav Leonhardt Knabenchor Hannover Leonhardt-Consort	soloist of the Knabenchor Hannover; René Jacobs; Marius van Altena; Max van Egmond	Teldec	1975	Period
Bach Made in Germany Vol. 4 – Cantatas IX	Hans-Joachim Rotzsch Thomanerchor Neues Bachisches Collegium Musicum	soloist of the Knabenchor Hannover; Ortrun Wenkel; Peter Schreier; Siegfried Lorenz	Eterna	1981	
J. S. Bach: Complete Cantatas Vol. 8	Ton Koopman Amsterdam Baroque Orchestra & Choir	Bogna Bartosz; Jörg Dürmüller; Klaus Mertens	Antoine Marchand	1998	Period
Bach Christmas Cantatas	Craig Smith chorus of Emmanuel Music orchestra of Emmanuel Music	Gloria Raymond; Frank Kelley; Mark McSweeney	Koch International	1990	Period
Bach Edition Vol. 15 – Cantatas Vol. 8	Pieter Jan Leusink Holland Boys Choir Netherlands Bach Collegium	Sytse Buwalda; Marcel Beekman; Bas Ramselaar	Brilliant Classics	2000	Period
J. S. Bach: Cantatas Vol. 15 – Cantatas from Leipzig 1723	Masaaki Suzuki Bach Collegium Japan	Robin Blaze; Gerd Türk; Peter Kooy	BIS	2000	Period
Bach Cantatas Vol. 14: New York	John Eliot Gardiner Monteverdi Choir English Baroque Soloists	Robin Tyson; James Gilchrist; Peter Harvey	Soli Deo Gloria	2000	Period

== Cited sources ==
Scores

- Darzu ist erschienen der Sohn Gottes, BWV 40: Scores at the International Music Score Library Project
- "Darzu ist erschienen der Sohn Gottes BWV 40; BC A 12 / Sacred cantata (2nd Christmas Day)". Bach Digital. 2000.

Books

- Dürr, Alfred (1981). Die Kantaten von Johann Sebastian Bach (in German). Vol. 1 (4 ed.). Deutscher Taschenbuchverlag. ISBN 3-423-04080-7.

Online sources

Several databases provide additional information on each cantata, such as history, scoring, sources for text and music, translations to various languages, discography, discussion, and musical analysis.

The complete recordings of Bach's cantatas are accompanied by liner notes from musicians and musicologists: John Eliot Gardiner commented his Bach Cantata Pilgrimage, Klaus Hofmann wrote for Masaaki Suzuki, and Christoph Wolff for Ton Koopman.

- Ambrose, Z. Philip (2012). "BWV 40 Dazu ist erschienen der Sohn Gottes". University of Vermont.
- Bach, Peter (2012). "Darzu ist erschienen der Sohn Gottes" (in German). bach.de.
- Bischof, Walter F. (2012). "BWV 40 Darzu ist erschienen der Sohn Gottes". University of Alberta.
- Braatz, Thomas; Oron, Aryeh (2005). "Chorale Melodies used in Bach's Vocal Works / Wir Christenleut habn jetzund Freud". bach-cantatas.com.
- Braatz, Thomas; Oron, Aryeh (2005). "Chorale Melodies used in Bach's Vocal Works / Freuet euch, ihr Christen alle". bach-cantatas.com.
- Braatz, Thomas; Oron, Aryeh (2005). "Chorale Melodies used in Bach's Vocal Works / Schwing dich auf zu deinem Gott". bach-cantatas.com.
- Browne, Francis; Oron, Aryeh (2005). "Wir Christenleut habn jetzund Freud / Text and Translation of Chorale". bach-cantatas.com.
- Browne, Francis; Oron, Aryeh (2005). "Freuet euch, ihr Christen alle / Text and Translation of Chorale". bach-cantatas.com.
- Browne, Francis; Oron, Aryeh (2006). "Schwing dich auf zu deinem Gott / Text and Translation of Chorale". bach-cantatas.com.
- Dellal, Pamela (2021). "BWV 40 – "Dazu ist erschienen der Sohn Gottes"". pameladellal.com.
- Gardiner, John Eliot (2005). Johann Sebastian Bach (1685-1750) / Cantatas Nos 40, 91, 110 & 121 (Media notes). Soli Deo Gloria (at Hyperion Records website).
- Hofmann, Klaus (2000). "Darzu ist erschienen der Sohn Gottes, BWV 40" (PDF). bach-cantatas.com.
- Mincham, Julian (2010). "Chapter 31 Bwv 40 – The Cantatas of Johann Sebastian Bach". jsbachcantatas.com.
- Oron, Aryeh (2012). "Cantata BWV 40 Dazu ist erschienen der Sohn Gottes". bach-cantatas.
- Traupman-Carr, Carol (2006). "Cantata BWV 40 Darzu ist erschienen der Sohn Gottes". The Bach Choir of Bethlehem.
- Wolff, Christoph (1998). "On the first cycle of Bach's cantatas for the Leipzig liturgy (1723–1724) (III)" (PDF). bach-cantatas.com.
