= Du Hirte Israel, höre, BWV 104 =

Church cantata by Johann Sebastian Bach

Du Hirte Israel, höre
- BWV 104
- Church cantata by J. S. Bach
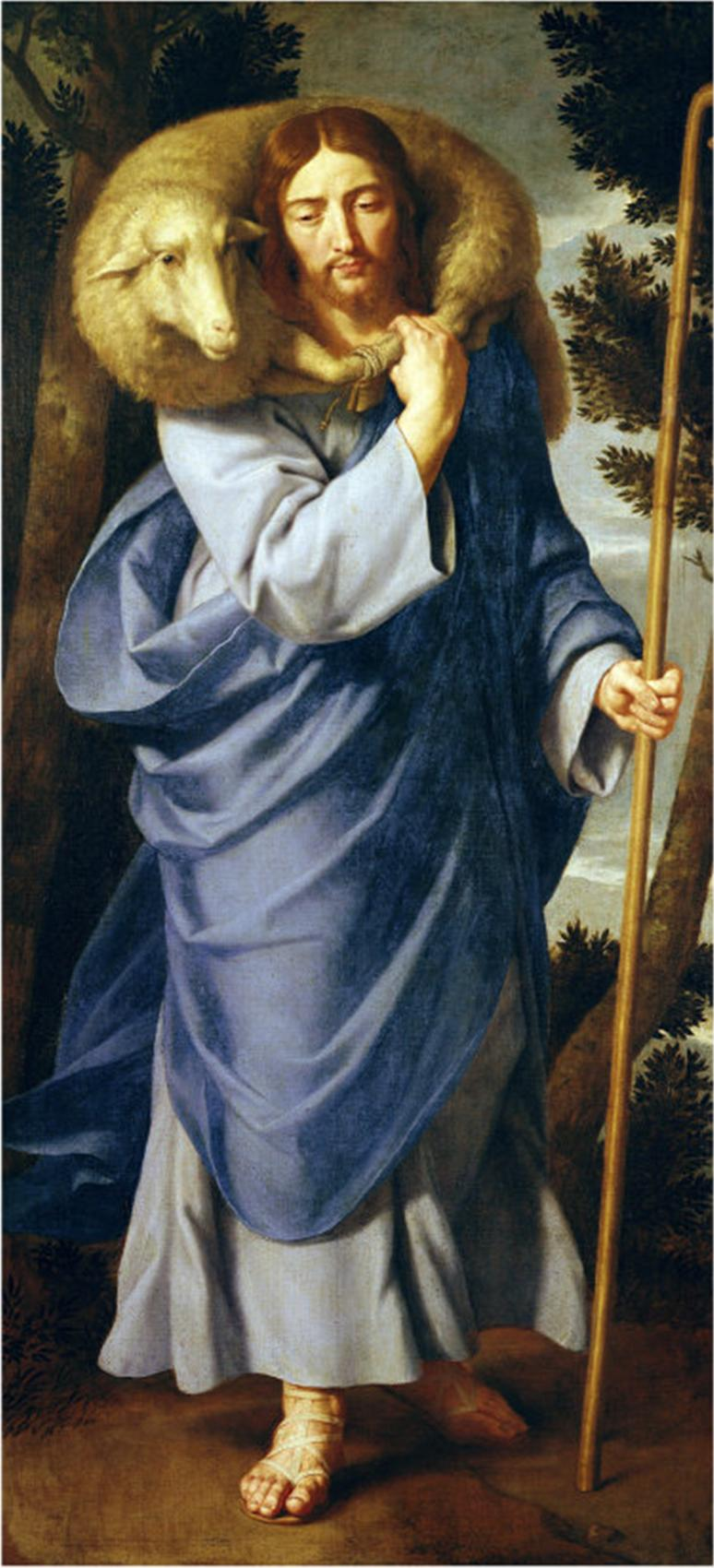
- The Good Shepherd, topic of the cantata, by Jean-Baptiste de Champaigne
- Occasion: Second Sunday after Easter
- Bible text: Psalms 80:1
- Chorale: "Der Herr ist mein getreuer Hirt" by Cornelius Becker
- Performed: 23 April 1724; 301 years ago: Leipzig
- Movements: 6
- Vocal: SATB choir; tenor and bass solo
- Instrumental: 2 oboes d'amore; taille; 2 violins; viola; continuo

Du Hirte Israel, höre (You Shepherd of Israel, hear), BWV 104, is a church cantata by Johann Sebastian Bach for the second Sunday after Easter. Bach composed the work as part of his first cantata cycle for Leipzig and first performed it on 23 April 1724.

The topic of the cantata, based on the prescribed reading from the Gospel of John, is Jesus as the Good Shepherd. The unknown librettist quoted and referred to related Biblical passages including the psalms. Bach structured the work in six movements and used pastoral music to illustrate the topic. The outer choral movements are an extended chorus, setting a verse from Psalm 80, and a four-part closing chorale of a hymn paraphrasing Psalm 23. Bach set the inner movements as alternating recitatives and arias. He scored the cantata for two vocal soloists, a four-part choir and a Baroque instrumental ensemble of a variety of oboes, strings and continuo.

== History and words ==
Bach had assumed his position as Thomaskantor in Leipzig in May 1723. He composed Du Hirte Israel, höre as part of his first cantata cycle there for the second Sunday after Easter, called Misericordias Domini, or "The Lord's mercy". The prescribed readings for that Sunday were from the First Epistle of Peter, Christ as a model (1 Peter 2:21–25), and from the Gospel of John, the Good Shepherd (John 10:11–16).

The unknown librettist found Biblical passages to quote and refer to even in the Old Testament, beginning with the first verse from Psalm 80 which reads in the King James Version: "Give ear, O Shepherd of Israel". In his poetry the writer referred to more Biblical context, such as Lamentations 3:22–25 and 1 Corinthians 10:13 used for the first recitative, reflecting that God as the Good Shepherd will take care. In the second recitative, he deduced: "Only gather, o good Shepherd, us poor and erring ones; ah, let our journey soon reach an end and lead us into your sheepfold!" The last aria expresses, based on (John 10:11–16, hope "for faith's reward after a gentle sleep of death" ("des Glaubens Lohn nach einem sanften Todesschlafe"), combining the Baroque ideas of pastoral peace and longing for death. He chose for the conclusion the first stanza of Cornelius Becker's 1598 hymn "Der Herr ist mein getreuer Hirt", a paraphrase of Psalm 23.

Bach led the first performance of the cantata at the Nikolaikirche on 23 April 1724.

== Music ==
=== Scoring and structure ===
Bach structured the cantata in six movements, scored for tenor (T) and bass (B) soloists, a four-part choir SATB, and a Baroque instrumental ensemble of two oboes (Ob, Nos 1 & 6), two oboes d'amore (Oa, Nos 3 & 5), taille (tenor oboe, Ot), two violins (Vl), viola (Va) and basso continuo.

In the following table of the movements, the scoring follows the Neue Bach-Ausgabe. The keys and time signatures are taken from Alfred Dürrs's standard book The Cantatas of J. S. Bach, using the symbol for common time (4/4). He gives the duration as 23 minutes.

Movements of Du Hirte Israel, höre
| No. | Title | Text | Type | Vocal | Winds | Strings | Key | Time |
|---|---|---|---|---|---|---|---|---|
| 1 | Du Hirte Israel, höre | Bible | Chorus | SATB | 2Ob Ot | 2Vl Va | G major | 3/4 |
| 2 | Der höchste Hirte sorgt vor mich | | Recitative | T | | | | common time |
| 3 | Verbirgt mein Hirte sich zu lange | | Aria | T | 2Oa | | B minor | common time |
| 4 | Ja, dieses Wort ist meiner Seelen Speise | | Recitative | B | | | D major | common time |
| 5 | Beglückte Herde, Jesu Schafe | | Aria | B | Ob | 2Vl Va | D major | 12/8 |
| 6 | Der Herr ist mein getreuer Hirt | Becker | Chorale | SATB | 2Ob | 2Vl Va | A major | common time |

=== Movements ===
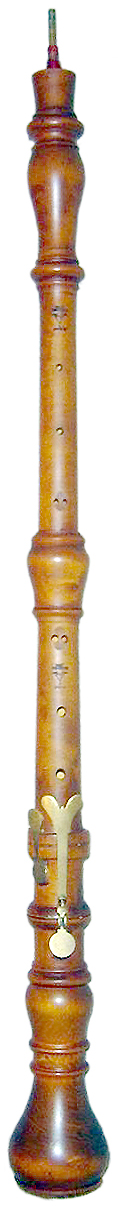
Baroque oboe d'amore

Bach referred in his music in various ways to the pastoral aspect of the text. Dürr noted that the Baroque period was fond of pastoral scenes, be it in painting, music or poetry, focused on a tranquil and peaceful mood to be associated to ideals such as innocence, love, faith and friendship. John Eliot Gardiner, who conducted the Bach Cantata Pilgrimage in 2000, reminds of the "predominantly agrarian society" of 18th-century Saxony, with an easy "transfer of rural imagery to contemplative religious texts". He notes an aspiring upward tonal progression from G major via B minor (tenor) and D major (bass) to A major.

==== 1 ====
In the instrumental introduction of the opening chorus, three oboes create pastoral sounds, which are frequently associated with shepherds, on the firm ground of extended pedal point in triplets. Bach used similar means in his Christmas Oratorio in the Sinfonia opening Part II. The choir often sings in homophony, in its first entrance "Du Hirte Israel, höre" (You Shepherd of Israel, give ear), and in short repeated calls such as "höre!" (give ear!) and "erscheine!" (appear!). The movements features two fugues, representing Joseph leading his flocks, which is illustrated in soft long runs in triplets. The fugue subject is the same in both fugues, but the second time the voices enter from the lowest to the highest, culminating in an ultimate third section of the calls that get more and more urgent. Different from similar settings, the instrumental introduction is not repeated after this climax. Gardiner described the movement as a "gentle choral dance", in a benign mood. He noted that the sonority of three oboes, often associated with shepherd music, was added to the strings later. The chorus was possibly a parody of a lost graduation cantata, Siehe der Hüter Israel, BWV Anh. 15.

==== 2 ====
The first short recitative, "Der höchste Hirte sorget vor mich" (The Highest Shepherd watches over me), is based on Lamentations 3:22–25, saying that the compassion of the Lord is new every morning. It leads to an arioso part ending with a quotation from 1 Corinthians 10:13, "Gott ist getreu" (God is faithful).

==== 3 ====
The tenor aria, "Verbirgt mein Hirte sich zu lange" (Though my Shepherd might remain hidden), is accompanied by two oboes d'amore. The text reflects that the singer sometimes feels "too anxious" in the wilderness and cries "a believing 'Abba'". The phrase is derived from Romans 8:15 ("ye have received the Spirit of adoption, whereby we cry, Abba, Father") and Galatians 4:6 ("And because ye are sons, God hath sent forth the Spirit of his Son into your hearts, crying, Abba, Father."). Bach emphasized "too anxious" with chromatic harmonies and motifs, and illustrated the cries of the middle section by both octave leaps and rising scales.

==== 4 ====
The second recitative is sung by the bass, "Ja, dieses Wort ist meiner Seelen Speise" (Yes, this word is the nourishment of my soul). The singer says that calling the Good Shepherd is a foretaste of heaven and prays to be included in the flock.

==== 5 ====
In the bass aria, "Beglückte Herde, Jesu Schafe" (Happy flock, sheep of Jesus), the singer reflects on looking forward to happiness after a "sweet sleep of death". The music is reminiscent of the opening chorus in instrumentation, triplets and extended pedal points. The passage of the sleep of death is marked by expressive harmonies while the musical themes continue. Gardiner writes that the opening section introduces phrases in 12/8 metre with "rich writing for the inner voices", creating "its own potent alchemy" in a pastoral dance seemingly secure. In the middle section, when "death's gentle slumber" is mentioned, the voice "sinks" and then gently rises and alights. A soothing mood is created by an undulating melody, a rhythmic pulse and a "rich harmonic weave" of the music. Gardiner quoted Laurence Dreyfus who commented: "it is precisely those ... momentary incursions of suffering into the innocence and tenderness that characterise what is so very remarkable about Bach", and continued that Bach's belief "is the motor for this music, his exegetical purpose to demonstrate that, with Christ's help, the 'meadow of heaven' is not a lost Arcadia but a realistically attainable destination.

==== 6 ====
The closing choral, "Der Herr ist mein getreuer Hirt" (The Lord is my faithful shepherd), is a four-part setting on the familiar tune of the German Gloria, "Allein Gott in der Höh sei Ehr".

=== Manuscripts and publication ===
While the autograph score of Du Hirte Israel, höre is lost, 12 manuscript parts survived.

The cantata was published by the Bach-Gesellschaft in the Bach-Gesellschaft Ausgabe (BGA), the first attempt at a complete edition of Bach's works a century after the composer's death, in vol. 23 in 1876. It was edited by Wilhelm Rust.

The New Bach Edition (Neue Bach-Ausgabe, NBA) published the work in 1988, edited by Reinmar Emans, with critical commentary added the following year. Carus published a critical edition in German and English as part of its Stuttgarter Bach-Ausgaben in 2017, edited by Reinhold Kubik.

== Recordings ==
The Bach Cantatas Website lists 38 recordings of the cantata as of 2024, including:

Recordings of Du Hirte Israel, höre
| Title | Conductor / Choir / Orchestra | Soloists | Label | Year |
|---|---|---|---|---|
| Les Grandes Cantates de J. S. Bach Vol. 2 | Fritz Werner Heinrich-Schütz-Chor Heilbronn Pforzheim Chamber Orchestra | Kurt Huber; Jakob Stämpfli | Erato | 1966 |
| Bach Cantatas Vol. 2 – Easter | Karl Richter Münchener Bach-Chor Münchener Bach-Orchester | Peter Schreier; Dietrich Fischer-Dieskau | Archiv Produktion | 1973 |
| J. S. Bach: Das Kantatenwerk • Complete Cantatas • Les Cantates, Folge / Vol. 6 | Nikolaus Harnoncourt Tölzer Knabenchor Concentus Musicus Wien | Kurt Equiluz; Philippe Huttenlocher | Teldec | 1980 |
| Die Bach Kantate Vol. 6 | Helmuth Rilling Gächinger Kantorei Bach-Collegium Stuttgart | Paul Agnew; Klaus Mertens | Hänssler | 2000 |
| Bach Cantatas Vol. 23: Arnstadt/Echternach | John Eliot Gardiner Monteverdi Choir English Baroque Soloists | Norbert Meyn; Stephen Varcoe | Soli Deo Gloria | 2000 |
| Bach Edition Vol. 4 – Cantatas Vol. 9 | Pieter Jan Leusink Holland Boys Choir Netherlands Bach Collegium | Knut Schoch; Bas Ramselaar | Brilliant Classics | 2000 |
| J. S. Bach: Complete Cantatas Vol. 6 | Ton Koopman Amsterdam Baroque Orchestra & Choir | Paul Agnew; Klaus Mertens | Antoine Marchand; OCLC 811333583 | 2000 |
| J. S. Bach: Cantatas Vol. 19 (Cantatas from Leipzig 1724) | Masaaki Suzuki Bach Collegium Japan | Makoto Sakurada; Stephan MacLeod | BIS | 2001 |
| Bachvespern Frankfurt/Wiesbaden Mitschnitte aus den Gottesdiensten Frühjahr 2005'' | Martin Lutz Kantorei St. Katharinen Bach-Collegium Frankfurt/Wiesbaden | Georg Poplutz; Markus Flaig | Bachvespern Frankfurt/Wiesbaden | 2005 |
| Bach: Cantata Du Hirte Israel, höre BWV 104'' | Jos van Veldhoven Netherlands Bach Society | Daniel Johannsen; Matthew Brook | Netherlands Bach Society | 2018 |
