= Edith Selig =

French classical soprano (1929–2020)

- Born: 20 September 1929; Strasbourg, France
- Died: 21 October 2020 (aged 91); Paris, France
- Other name: Édith Selig-Papée
- Occupations: Classical soprano; Academic voice teacher
- Organizations: École Normale de Musique de Paris; European Voice Teachers Association

Édith Selig-Papée (20 September 1929 – 21 October 2020) was a French classical soprano in concert, opera and Lied, known for singing music of Johann Sebastian Bach and French composers. She has been teaching at the École Normale de Musique de Paris.

== Professional career ==
In 1958, she recorded Mahler's Symphony No. 2 with Eugenia Zareska, the Choeurs et Orchestre national de la Radiodiffusion française conducted by Carl Schuricht.

She recorded Bach cantatas with Fritz Werner, the Heinrich-Schütz-Chor Heilbronn and the Pforzheim Chamber Orchestra, including Ich hatte viel Bekümmernis, BWV 21, an early ambitious work in eleven movements, performed in Weimar in 1714 on the third Sunday after Trinity. She also recorded with the same ensemble Bach's Actus tragicus and Easter Oratorio. In the 1960s she recorded Bach's Magnificat and Missa in F Major, BWV 233, with Karl Ristenpart, Claudia Hellmann, Georg Jelden, Jakob Stämpfli and Maurice André (trumpet).

She has specialized in singing works of French composers. In 1960 she recorded in Paris Gluck's Orfeo ed Euridice, conducted by Charles Bruck, with Rita Gorr and Nadine Sautereau. In 1963 she recorded Rameau's Acte de ballet Pigmalion, conducted by Marcel Couraud. She recorded Esprit Joseph Antoine Blanchard's Te Deum, conducted by Louis Frémaux. In 1996 she recorded Charpentier's Te Deum with the Paul Kuentz Chamber Orchestra, conducted by Paul Kuentz.

She has been teaching at the École Normale de Musique de Paris.

Along with voice teachers such as Régine Crespin and Jakob Stämpfli, Edith Selig-Papée was a founding member of the European Voice Teachers Association (EVTA) in 1988. She has lectured internationally, such as on La Mélodie Francaise in Detmold and Philadelphia.

She has served on the jury of international competitions such as the 23rd Concours international de chant de Paris in 2001.

== Death ==
Selig died of natural causes on 21 October 2020, in Paris, France, where she lived, at the age of 91.
