= Kurt Huber (tenor) =

Swiss tenor for concert and Lieder (born 1937)

- Born: 4 May 1937; Zürich
- Occupation: Classical tenor

Kurt Huber (born 4 May 1937) is a Swiss tenor for concert and Lieder.

== Career ==
Born in Zürich, Kurt Huber studied voice in Vienna with Anton Dermota.

He performed solo parts in works of Johann Sebastian Bach, especially the Evangelist in his passions and oratorios. On 19 March 1967, he performed the Evangelist in the St Matthew Passion in the Tonhalle Zürich with the Zürcher Bach Chor. He sang in the Konstantinbasilika with the Trierer Bachchor, in 1971 in the Christmas Oratorio, along with Julia Hamari, in 1973 in the St. John Passion, with Wolfgang Schöne, and in 1980 in the St. Matthew Passion, with Hildegard Laurich. He sang the St John Passion in Ulm with the choir Ulmer Kantorei on 4 May 1985.

Kurt Huber frequently performed the tenor part in the recordings of Bach cantatas with the Heinrich-Schütz-Chor Heilbronn, the Pforzheim Chamber Orchestra and Fritz Werner, also the Evangelist of Bach's Ascension Oratorio. A reviewer described his performance:

He sings with excellent, plangent tone and is wonderfully fluent in the very difficult chromatics of his aria ... Much though I admire Helmut Krebs I think that Huber actually makes a more ingratiating sound. He seems, dare I say it, more polished than his distinguished colleague and his voice is certainly more even.

Kurt Huber has appeared in Handel's oratorios Messiah, Judas Maccabaeus, Israel in Egypt, Samson, Saul and Joshua. He sang in Haydn's The Creation and The Seasons, in Mozart's masses and Requiem, Beethoven's 9th Symphony and Missa solemnis. Oratorios from the period of Romanticism have included Liszt's Christus and Mendelssohn's Elijah and Paulus. He has performed in Bruckner's masses, Dvořák's Requiem and Stabat Mater, Verdi's Requiem and works by Gustav Mahler and Franz Schmidt.

In 1963 Kurt Huber participated in the Swiss premiere of Mozart's Apollo und Hyacinth. With the Heinrich-Schütz-Chor Heilbronn he sang in concert Bach's Hohe Messe in h-moll with Herrad Wehrung, Claudia Hellmann, Jakob Stämpfli, Maurice André (trumpet), Hermann Baumann (horn), the Württembergisches Kammerorchester Heilbronn, conducted by Fritz Werner in 1967, in Mendelssohn's Elias with Siegmund Nimsgern in the title role in 1968, and in Handel's Messias with the Württembergisches Kammerorchester Heilbronn in 1985, also in the Stadtkirche Bad Wimpfen. With the choir Philharmonischer Chor Schwäbisch Gmünd he performed Haydn's Die Schöpfung (The Creation) in 1971 with Ursula Buckel and Roland Hermann, Bruckner's Mass No. 3 and Te Deum with Kari Løvaas, Hildegard Rütgers and Günter Reich, and Verdi's Messa da Requiem in 1987, also in the Münster of the Zwiefalten Abbey. In 1982 he performed the tenor part of Puccini's Messa di Gloria.

Kurt Huber has been a teacher at the Musikhochschule Zürich.

== Recordings ==
Huber's recordings besides Bach have included rare repertoire such as Carissimi's oratorio Jephte, a Magnificat of Claudio Monteverdi and a Magnificat of Heinrich Schütz, all with the Spandauer Kantorei and Helmuth Rilling, German Lieder by Ludwig Senfl, and the oratorio Das Gesicht Jesajas (The Vision of Isaiah) op. 41 of Willy Burkhard, with Adele Stolte, Jakob Stämpfli and the Berner Symphonieorchester conducted by Martin Flämig.
