= Wir Christenleut =

1680 Christian hymn

- Lutheran chorale
- English: We Christian people
- Text: by Kaspar Füger
- Language: German
- Meter: 4-4-11-4-4-11
- Melody: anon.
- Composed: 1589
- Published: 1592

"Wir Christenleut" (We Christian people) is a Lutheran hymn for Christmas with text by Kaspar Füger, published in 1592.

== History ==
Kaspar Füger was pastor at the Kreuzkirche, Dresden. He wrote "Wir Christenleut" for Christmas. He and his son of the same name, who served as Kreuzkantor at the same church, published hymns in a collection Christliche Verß und Gesenge (Christian poems and songs) in 1592.

The text is in five stanzas of six lines each, rhyming AABCCB. The A and C lines are short, while the B lines are more than twice as long. The hymn deals with the joy about the birth of Jesus to redeem sinful people, born by Mary, followed by thanks for that joy and a closing Alleluja.

Johann Sebastian Bach set different stanzas of the hymn, using an anonymous tune first published in 1589, for his Christmas cantatas Darzu ist erschienen der Sohn Gottes, BWV 40 (1723), and Unser Mund sei voll Lachens, BWV 110, and as the final chorale in Part III of his Christmas Oratorio of 1734.
