= Der Herr ist mein getreuer Hirt =

Lutheran hymns in German

- Lutheran hymn
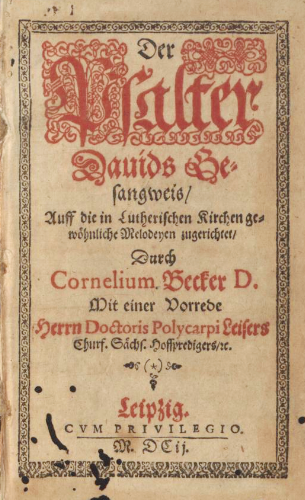
- Title page of the Becker Psalter, 1602
- English: The Lord is my faithful Shepherd
- Written: 17th century
- Text: by Cornelius Becker
- Language: German
- Based on: Psalm 23
- Melody: from Wittenberg
- Composed: 1529
- Published: 1598

"Der Herr ist mein getreuer Hirt" (The Lord is my faithful Shepherd) is a Lutheran hymn in German, a paraphrase of Psalm 23. The text was written by Cornelius Becker, first published in 1598 and again in the Becker Psalter in 1602. Heinrich Schütz set the text to music, using a 1529 tune. Johann Sebastian Bach used the text in church cantatas, setting a different tune. The song is still part of hymnals.

== History ==
The German Cornelius Becker, who was a Lutheran pastor in Leipzig, wrote the text of "Der Herr ist mein getreuer Hirt" in the 17th century as a metred paraphrase of Psalm 23 in German, first published in 1598 in the collection Cantionum Ecclesiasticarum. He published it again in 1602 in the collection that became known as the Becker Psalter, of all psalms in his metred versions. Heinrich Schütz composed four-part settings of these metres psalm texts. The setting of this hymn, using a 1529 melody from Wittenberg, was assigned SWV 120 in his works list.

Johann Sebastian Bach included the first of its three stanzas in his 1724 cantata Du Hirte Israel, höre, BWV 104, as the concluding chorale for also four voices, using the melody of "Allein Gott in der Höh sei Ehr", the German Gloria. He included the same stanza a year later as the third movement of Ich bin ein guter Hirt, BWV 85, this time for a soprano singer with the same melody slightly embellished.

The hymn is contained in a regional section of the Protestant hymnal Evangelisches Gesangbuch and in the hymnal of the Herrnhut Brethren.
