= Scherler =

Scherler is a surname. Notable people with the surname include:

- Barbara Scherler (born 1938, Leipzig), a German classical mezzo-soprano and alto singer in opera and concert
- Daisy von Scherler Mayer (born 1966, New York City), is an American film director
