= Jörg Faerber =

German conductor (1929–2022)

- Jörg Faerber, c. 1990
- Born: 18 June 1929; Stuttgart, Württemberg, Germany
- Died: 13 September 2022 (aged 93); Willich, North Rhine-Westphalia, Germany
- Education: Musikhochschule Stuttgart
- Occupation: Conductor
- Organizations: Württemberg Chamber Orchestra Heilbronn
- Awards: Order of Merit of the Federal Republic of Germany

Jörg Faerber (18 June 1929 – 13 September 2022) was a German conductor. He founded the Württemberg Chamber Orchestra Heilbronn (WKO) in 1960 and was its artistic and managing director for over 40 years. He was known internationally, touring to the U.S., Japan and South Africa. The WKO made many recordings with soloists including Maurice André, Alfred Brendel, Gidon Kremer and Anne-Sophie Mutter.

== Life and career ==
Born in Stuttgart on 18 June 1929, Faerber graduated from a Humanistisches Gymnasium there in 1949. He studied at the Musikhochschule Stuttgart, graduating as kapellmeister in 1953. From 1954 until 1962 he held the post of musical director of the Theater Heilbronn. His all-round job there included rehearsals, making arrangements, conducting a stage orchestra, and playing the piano for operetta performances, providing experience in many fields.

Faerber founded a chamber orchestra, Württembergisches Kammerorchester Heilbronn (WKO, Württemberg Chamber Orchestra Heilbronn), in 1960, becoming its artistic director and CEO. The first concert was played on 27 January 1961 at the Festhalle Harmonie in Heilbronn, with the orchestra named Kammerorchester Heilbronn (Heilbronn Chamber Orchestra). A programme of Baroque music contained Francesco Geminiani's Concerto grosso, Op. 3/3, Bach's Harpsichord Concerto No. 4, Handel's Concerto grosso Op. 6/7, Bach Ricercare from the Musical Offering, Handel's Oboe Concerto in G minor, and Bach's Orchestral Suite No. 3. In the beginning, four violinists, two violists and a cellist, travelled to concert locations in two private cars. Initially they were focused on Baroque music, but soon widened the repertoire towards the classical period, especially music by Mozart. The present name was chosen on 30 April 1962.

Faerber led the orchestra until February 2002 as conductor and artistic manager, touring the United States, Canada, England, France, Austria, Japan and South Africa. Among the soloists who have regularly worked with the WKO were Maurice André, Alfred Brendel, Gidon Kremer, and Anne-Sophie Mutter, who was Faerber's friend. Soloist also included Martha Argerich, Rudolf Buchbinder, Hilary Hahn, Sharon Kam, Mstislav Rostropovich, and Frank Peter Zimmermann. Faerber was invited as a guest conductor by orchestras of the BBC and the English Chamber Orchestra; he was principal guest conductor of the European Community Chamber Orchestra, and conducted the Royal Northern Sinfonia, the Bournemouth Sinfonietta and symphony orchestras in Austria, Italy, France, Romania and the Czech Republic.

Faerber retired as director of the WKO in 2002, with Ruben Gazarian as his successor. In 2009, on the occasion of his 80th birthday, he conducted the orchestra once more.

=== Private life ===
Faerber was married to the actress Ursula Münch, who was a member of the Theater Heilbronn, from 1959. The couple had a daughter. In retirement, he lived in Willich, near his daughter.

Faerber died on 13 September 2022, at the age of 93.

== Recordings ==
Faerber made more than 500 recordings with the WKO.

In 1990 Faerber conducted the WKO in a recording of three of Carl Philipp Emanuel Bach's flute concertos with soloist James Galway. In 1994 he combined Shostakovich's Concerto for piano, trumpet and string orchestra, Op. 35, and Haydn's Concerto for harpsichord and orchestra in D major, Hob.XVIII:11, both performed by Martha Argerich, with trumpeter Guy Touvron.

== Awards ==
In 1986, Faerber was honoured with the title "Professor". He was the recipient of the following awards:

- Goldene Münze (Golden coin) of Heilbronn, 1976
- Order of Merit of the Federal Republic of Germany, 1984
- Ehrenring (Ring of honour) of Heilbronn, 1999

From 2002 he was a Conductor Laureate of the WKO.
