= Penthesilea (opera) =

1927 opera by Othmar Schoeck

- Opera by Othmar Schoeck
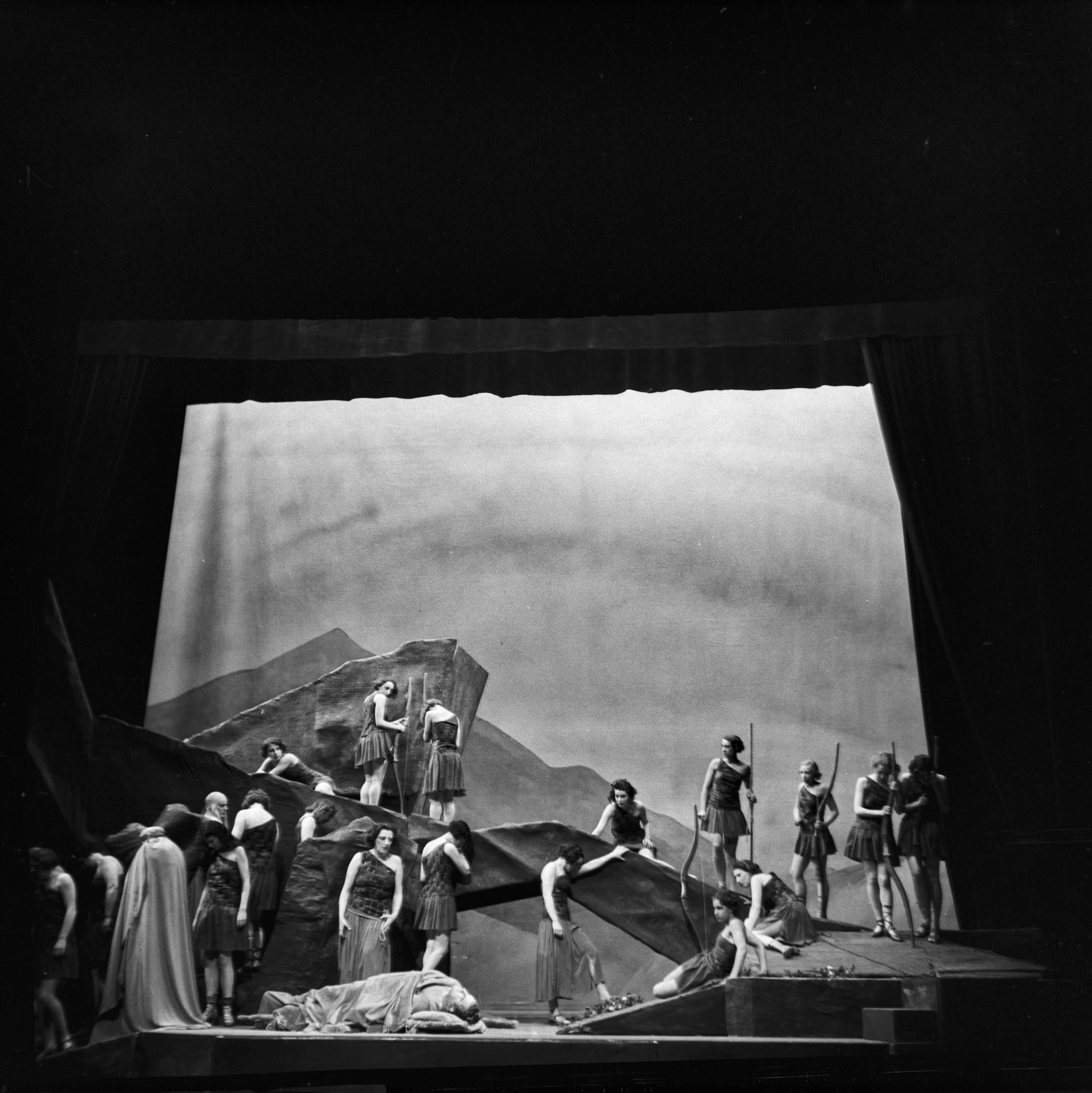
- Penthesilea, Stadttheater Bern, 1936
- Librettist: Schoeck
- Language: German
- Based on: Penthesilea by Heinrich von Kleist
- Premiere: 8 January 1927; Semperoper, Dresden

Penthesilea is a one-act opera by Othmar Schoeck, to a German-language libretto by the composer, after the work of the same name by Heinrich von Kleist. It was first performed at the Staatsoper in Dresden on 8 January 1927.

Schoeck used the contrast between C major and F♯ major as a musical basis for his work. Robin Holloway has noted the similarity of theme to Richard Strauss' Elektra, as well as Schoeck's use of two pianos in the instrumentation.

== Roles ==
Roles, voice types, premiere cast
Role	Voice type	Premiere cast, 8 January 1927 Conductor: Hermann Ludwig Kutzschbach
Penthesilea	mezzo-soprano	Irma Tervani
Meroe	soprano	Eugenie Burckhardt
High Priestess	mezzo-soprano	Elfriede Haberkorn
Prothoe	soprano	Maria Rösler-Keuschnigg
Diomedes	tenor	Ludwig Eybisch
Achilles	bass	Friedrich Plaschke
Herald	baritone	Paul Schöffler

== Synopsis ==
The story is about the tragic love of Penthesilea, queen of the Amazons, and Achilles.

Achilles has defeated the Amazon queen Penthesilea in battle. However, he falls in love with her. After Penthesilea has recovered, Achilles allows her to think that she defeated him, because Amazon law stipulates a warrior may only associate with a man whom she has defeated. Under this idea, Penthesilea returns the affections of Achilles. However, she finally does learn the truth, that in fact he defeated her in battle, and her love for him becomes hatred. Achilles then offers a second challenge to her, but he plans to come unarmed and to let her win. In her anger, she takes up the challenge, and in the duel, she savagely kills him.

== Recordings ==
- Walhall/Eternity Serie: Martha Mödl, Paula Brivkalne, Paula Lechner-Schmidt, Res Fischer, Eberhard Waechter, Stefan Schwer; Staatsopernchor und Staatsorchester Stuttgart; Ferdinand Leitner conductor (live recording from Stuttgart State Theatre, 15 December 1957)
- BASF/Harmonia Mundi: Carol Smith, Hana Janků, Barbara Scherler, Raili Kostia, Roland Hermann, William Blankenship, Kurt Widmer; NDR Chor (Helmut Franz) and chorus of the West German Broadcasting, Cologne (Herbert Schernus); Cologne Radio Symphony Orchestra; Zdeněk Mácal, conductor (broadcast concert performance 8 September 1973 at the Lucerne International Musikfest weeks). (BASF LPs 49 22485-6)
- Orfeo D'Or: Helga Dernesch, Mechthild Gessendorf, Marjana Lipovšek, Gabriele Sima, Jane Marsh, Horst Hiestermann, Theo Adam, Peter Weber; Austrian Radio Chorus; Austrian Radio Symphony Orchestra; Gerd Albrecht, conductor (live recording from Salzburg, 1982)
- Pan Classics 510 118: Yvonne Naef, James Johnson, Ute Trekel-Burckhardt; Czech Philharmonic Choir Brno; Basel Symphony Orchestra; Mario Venzago, conductor
