= Barbara Scherler =

German opera singer

- Born: 20 January 1933 (age 92); Leipzig
- Education: Musikhochschule Berlin
- Occupation: Classical contralto
- Organization: Deutsche Oper Berlin

Barbara Scherler (born 20 January 1933) is a German classical mezzo-soprano and contralto singer in opera and concert. She was a member of the Deutsche Oper Berlin and active in performances and recordings of operas of the 20th century.

== Career ==
Born in Leipzig, Scherler studied at the Musikhochschule Berlin and with Margarete Bärwinkel.

She made her opera debut in 1959 at the Staatsoper Hannover in the part of Cherubino in Mozart's Le nozze di Figaro. She remained a member of the opera house until 1964. She was engaged at the Cologne Opera until 1968 and since a member of the Deutsche Oper Berlin. She sang in the premieres of operas, in 1976 in Toshiro Mayuzumi’s Kinkakuji after Mishima Yukio's novel The Temple of the Golden Pavilion, in 1979 in Wilhelm Dieter Siebert's Der Untergang der Titanic, and in 1984 in Aribert Reimann’s Die Gespenstersonate (The Ghost Sonata), after August Strindberg. She participated in live recordings of operas, in 1965 and 1968 Alban Berg's Lulu and Wozzeck, both conducted by Karl Böhm, and in 1978 she sang the part of Elsbeth in Feuersnot of Richard Strauss, Erich Leinsdorf conducting the Berliner Rundfunk-Sinfonie-Orchester and the RIAS Kammerchor. In 1967 she sang the part of Smeton in a broadcast performance of Donizetti's Anna Bolena, produced by the WDR in 1967, with Teresa Żylis-Gara in the title role and Karl Ridderbusch as Enrico, conducted by Alberto Erede. In 1973 she performed the part of Meroe in a recording of Othmar Schoeck's opera Penthesilea after Kleist, with Zdeněk Mácal conducting the Kölner Rundfunk-Sinfonie-Orchester. In 1990 she appeared in a recording of Franz Schreker's Der ferne Klang with the RIAS Kammerchor and the Radio-Symphonie-Orchester, conducted by Gerd Albrecht.

Scherler recorded several Bach cantatas with Fritz Werner, including in 1973 Alles nur nach Gottes Willen, BWV 72, with the Heinrich-Schütz-Chor Heilbronn, Württemberg Chamber Orchestra Heilbronn. Ingeborg Reichelt and Bruce Abel. She recorded Mozart's Requiem with chorus and orchestra of the Gulbenkian Foundation, Lisbon, conducted by Michel Corboz, with Elly Ameling, Louis Devos and Roger Soyer.
