= Kaspar Füger =

- Born: c. 1521; Dresden
- Died: c. 1592; Dresden
- Occupations: Lutheran pastor; Hymn writer

Kaspar Füger (also Caspar; c. 1521 – after 1592) was a German Lutheran pastor and hymn writer.

Füger was born around 1521 in Dresden. He worked as a chaplain in Torgau, Saxony, and later he served as pastor at the Kreuzkirche, Dresden. He died after 1592. His son of the same name was a composer of hymns and from 1585 to 1586 Kreuzkantor (director of music) at the same church.

Füger the Elder wrote a Christmas carol, "Wir Christenleut". which was used by several composers. Johann Sebastian Bach set different stanzas of it, on the tune by Johann Crüger, for his Christmas cantatas Darzu ist erschienen der Sohn Gottes, BWV 40 (1723), and Unser Mund sei voll Lachens, BWV 110, and as the final chorale in Part III of his Christmas Oratorio of 1734.
