= Claudia Hellmann =

German opera singer (1923–2017)

Claudia Hellmann (25 November 1923 – 24 May 2017) was a German contralto concert and operatic singer, primarily with the Stuttgart Opera.

== Biography ==
Hellmann was born in Berlin on 25 November 1923, where she studied voice with Erika Garski. She made her operatic debut in 1958 at the Bayreuth Festival in the parts of Wellgunde in Wagner's Der Ring des Nibelungen, 4. Edelknabe in Lohengrin and 1. Knappe in Parsifal. She sang there annually until 1961, including the part of Waltraute in Götterdämmerung in 1960. She was a member of the Theater Münster from 1958 until 1960, the Stuttgart Opera, from 1966 the opera house of Nürnberg, and she returned to Stuttgart in 1975, singing there until 1983.

Hellmann frequently performed the contralto part in the recordings of Bach's cantatas, his Christmas Oratorio and his Easter Oratorio with the Heinrich-Schütz-Chor Heilbronn, the Pforzheim Chamber Orchestra and Fritz Werner.

She recorded Bach's Magnificat and his Missa in F major with Karl Ristenpart, the Chorale Philippe Caillard, the Saar Radio Chamber Orchestra, Edith Selig, Georg Jelden, Jakob Stämpfli and Maurice André (trumpet) in 1964.

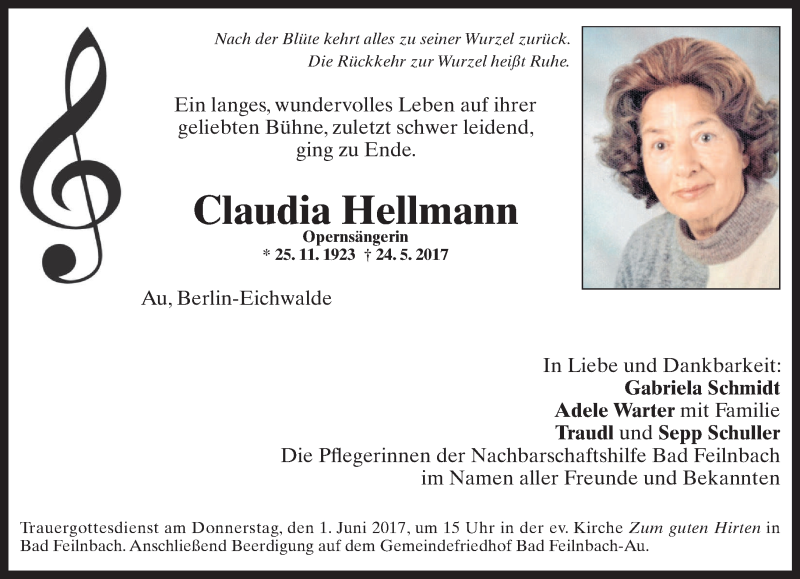
Death notice of Claudia Hellmann

In 1963, she recorded the part of Ismene in Orff's Antigonae with Inge Borkh as Antigonae, Kieth Engen as Chorführer, Hetty Plümacher as Eurydice, Fritz Uhl as Haemon, and Ernst Haefliger as Tiresias, Ferdinand Leitner conducting the Bavarian Radio Symphony Orchestra and Choir. She died in Bad Feilnbach-Au on 24 May 2017.
