= Carol Smith (contralto) =

American contralto (1926–2021)

- Born: 20 February 1926; Oak Park, Illinois, U.S.
- Died: 6 June 2021 (aged 95); Marseilles, Illinois, U.S.
- Occupations: Classical contralto; Academic teacher
- Organizations: Zürich Opera; Musikhochschule Zürich; Indiana University Bloomington

Carol Louise Smith (February 20, 1926 – June 6, 2021) was an American contralto who made an international career in opera and concert, and was an academic teacher at the Musikhochschule Zürich and at the Indiana University Bloomington.

== Career ==
Born in Oak Park, Illinois, she made her debut as a concert singer in Chicago after studies with Lola Fletcher. For twelve years she was a soloist with the Bach Aria Group, recording Bach cantatas and other works. She then moved to Italy to study operatic singing with Mario Cordone in Milan. She made her stage debut in 1961 at the Teatro di San Carlo in Naples. In 1965, she became a member of the Zürich Opera where she stayed to 1981. Her roles there included Geneviève in Debussy's Pelléas et Mélisande, Santuzza in Mascagni's Cavalleria rusticana, Czipra in Der Zigeunerbaron by Johann Strauss, Giulietta in Offenbach's Les Contes d'Hoffmann, the Countess in Tchaikovsky's Pique Dame, Ortrud in Wagner's Lohengrin, Brangäne in his Tristan und Isolde, and Maria in Gershwin's Porgy and Bess. Her stage presence served also contemporary opera, including the role of Pythia in Reimann's Melusine and the title role in Othmar Schoeck's Penthesilea. She sang Verdi's leading roles Eboli in Don Carlos, Amneris in Aida, and Azucena in Il trovatore, and also Maddalena in Rigoletto, Ulrica in Un ballo in maschera and Mrs. Quickly in Falstaff. Smith appeared at festivals such as the Casals Festival on Puerto Rico, Aix-en-Provence Festival, Salzburg Festival and the Maggio Musicale Fiorentino, in both opera and concert. In 1971 she participated in the premiere of Alberto Ginastera's Beatrix Cenci for the opening of the new opera house in the Kennedy Center).

Smith was a voice teacher at the Musikhochschule Zürich from 1979 to 1984, and then at the Indiana University Bloomington.

Smith recorded both operatic and concert music. She sang the role of Lola in Cavalleria rusticana in 1953, alongside Zinka Milanov, Jussi Björling and Robert Merrill, with Renato Cellini conducting the Robert Shaw Chorale and the RCA Victor Symphony Orchestra. Smith was a soloist in a recording of Debussy's cantata La Damoiselle élue alongside Victoria de los Ángeles, conducted by Charles Munch in 1955. She recorded Beethoven's Missa solemnis, Verdi's Messa da Requiem and de Falla's El amor brujo. She appeared as Mrs. Quickly in Falstaff, a performance in German at the Bavarian State Opera in 1974, conducted by Wolfgang Sawallisch and alongside Dietrich Fischer-Dieskau in the title role, which was recorded.

Smith died in Marseilles, Illinois, on 6 June 2021, at the age of 95.
