= Penthesilea (Kleist) =

1808 tragedy by Heinrich von Kleist

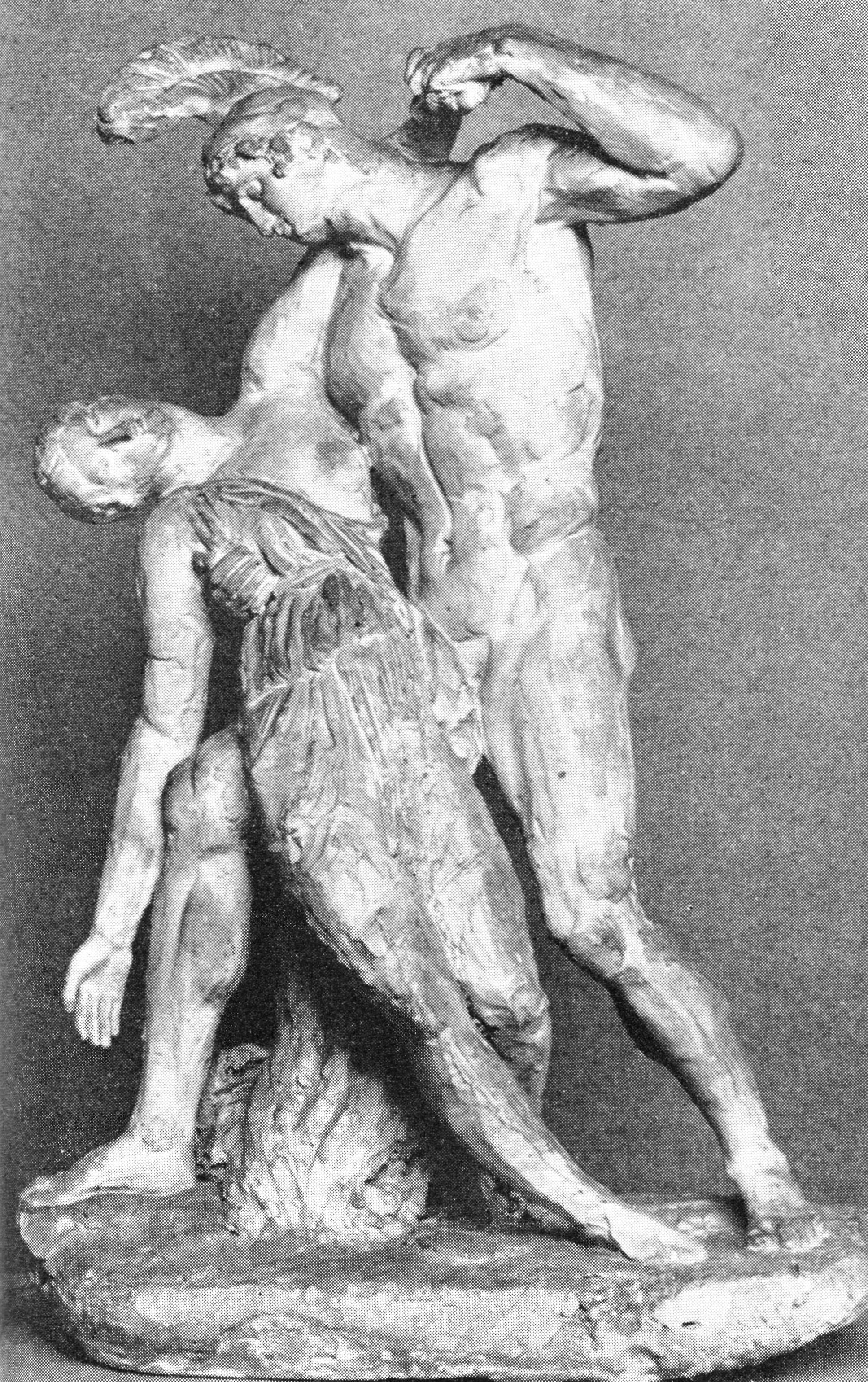
Achilles and Penthesilea (1801), by Bertel Thorvaldsen

Penthesilea is an 1808 tragedy by the German playwright Heinrich von Kleist about the mythological Amazon queen, Penthesilea, described as an exploration of sexual frenzy. Goethe rejected it as "unplayable". It was first performed on 25 April 1876 at the Königliches Schauspielhaus in Berlin, 65 years after the author's death.

== Summary ==
The Amazons, a fierce race of female warriors, have a sacred tradition: they can marry only those warriors whom they have defeated in battle. Nor may they choose their partners voluntarily even from the ranks of the defeated, but must submit to random pairing at a Festival of Roses. The Amazons therefore intervene in the Trojan War to fight against the Greeks so that they can gain captives.

The drama opens on the battlefield before the gates of Troy, where the Greeks are besieging the city and are interrupted by belligerent Amazons who attack and endanger the Greek princes. At a parley, the Amazon queen Penthesilea and the Greek prince Achilles come face-to-face and fall in love; from now on she will devote all her energy to overcoming Achilles in battle so that she may win him as her husband. The Greeks do not understand why the Amazons refuse to form an alliance or, when battle is resumed, why Penthesilea so single-mindedly pursues Achilles.

In the second scene the Greeks learn that Penthesilea has captured their hero Achilles. The messenger describes the Amazons' surprise attack. They surrounded Achilles, who first freed himself and tried to flee until his horses and his cart collapsed. Penthesilea and her followers drew closer, but when the queen's chariot overturned he escaped.

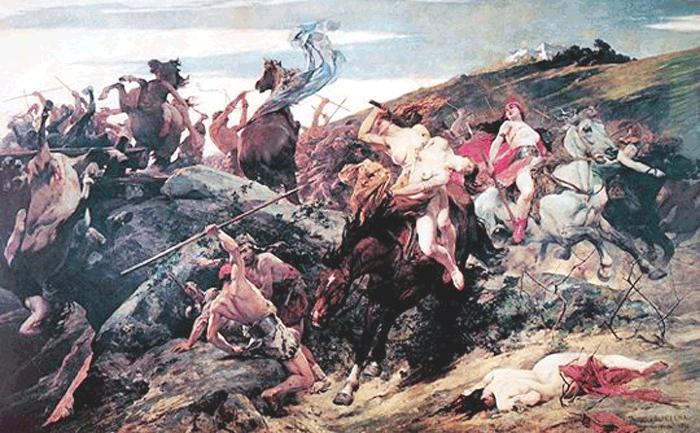
Penthesilea (1891) by Arturo Michelena

In the fourth scene the Greeks welcome Achilles and acclaim him for his escape. Meanwhile, the Amazons rashly celebrate their victory.

Now the Archpriestess of Diana orders her maidens to pluck roses for the Amazons' victory. Competing for the most and prettiest roses, the girls quarrel. Achilles enters the Amazon camp in search of Penthesilea despite the orders of Odysseus to return to the Greek army, and finds her unconscious in the arms of her devoted friend Prothoe; he explains to Prothoe that he has fallen in love with Penthesilea and wishes to marry her. Prothoe tells Achilles not to let Penthesilea know that he conquered her. When Penthesilea regains consciousness, she is led to believe that she was the victor in their personal combat and that therefore she can claim him as her husband. But the arrival of a troop of Greek soldiers compels Achilles to reveal the truth about their combat, and he is forced to leave, taking the Greek prisoners with him. The Archpriestess curses the Queen for betraying the race, having put personal desires before duty. Meanwhile, Achilles, realising that he must be conquered by Penthesilea, sends her (via a herald) a challenge to single combat, and goes unarmed to meet her. Penthesilea, however, in a characteristically Kleistian misunderstanding of Achilles' intentions, believes that she has been scorned. Mad with fury she transfixes him with an arrow and sets her hunting dogs on him. She then tears his body apart, with hands and teeth. When her calmness returns, she recognizes her mistake, but says that there is little difference between biting and kissing. She kisses Achilles' dead body, and wills herself to fall dead over it.

The central dynamic of the play lies in the mutual passion of Achilles and Penthesilea. Kleist reverses the narrative found in Homer's Iliad and elsewhere: Achilles does not kill, but rather is killed.

== Translations ==
- Joel Agee: Penthesilea: A Tragic Drama (1998)

== Adaptations ==
- Ouverture Penthesilea, Op. 31 by Karl Goldmark (1884)
- Symphonic poem Penthesilea by Hugo Wolf (1885)
- Opera by Othmar Schoeck of the same name (1927)
- Opera Penthesilea by Pascal Dusapin, premiered in 2015
- Opera Mauerschau by Hauke Berheide (music) and Amy Stebbins (libretto) (2016)
- Erinnere dich, Penthesilea, adapted as a two-actor play (Sandra Hüller and Jens Harzer) and directed by Johan Simons for the 2018 Salzburg Festival; co-production with Schauspielhaus Bochum

== Notes ==
Sources

- Banham, Martin, ed. 1998. The Cambridge Guide to Theatre. Cambridge: Cambridge University Press. ISBN 0-521-43437-8.
- Lamport, Francis John. 1990. German Classical Drama: Theatre, Humanity and Nation, 1750–1870. Cambridge: Cambridge University Press. ISBN 0-521-36270-9.
