= Cornelius Becker =

German Lutheran pastor (1561–1604)

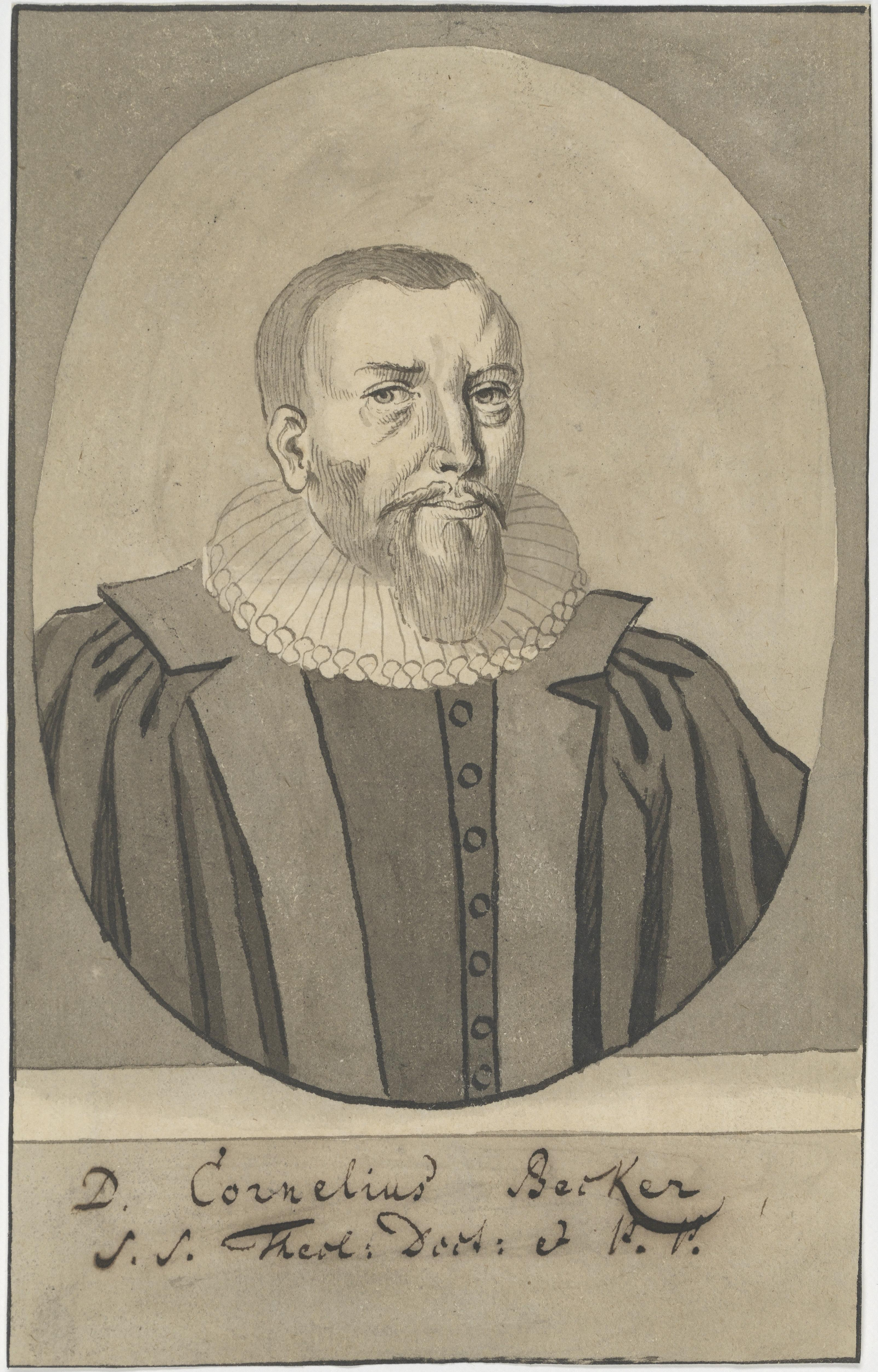
Cornelius Becker

Cornelius Becker (1561–1604) was an Orthodox Lutheran pastor in Leipzig. He prepared the Becker Psalter, some of which Heinrich Schütz set to music. Bach used his version of Psalm 23 for his cantata Du Hirte Israel, höre, BWV 104.
