= Georg Jelden =

Austrian classical tenor (1929–2022)

- Born: 28 November 1928; Erlangen, Bavaria, Germany
- Died: 22 September 2004 (aged 75); Stuttgart, Baden-Württemberg, Germany
- Occupation: Classical tenor

Georg Jelden (28 November 1928 – 22 September 2004) was a German classical tenor, later baritone, and an academic teacher of music. He recorded works by Johann Sebastian Bach with several conductors, especially cantatas with Fritz Werner.

== Life and career ==
Jelden was born in Erlangen on 28 November 1928. He was a member of the Thomanerchor in Leipzig. Jelden studied voice with Emge in Karlsruhe. He was a member of the Staatsoper Stuttgart but soon focused on concert singing. Jelden became known as a singer of works by Johann Sebastian Bach, performed in Germany and on international tours in Europe and North America. He was the tenor soloist in Mozart's Requiem at the 1963 Salzburg Festival. His voice later changed to baritone.

Jelden began teaching at the Musikhochschule Frankfurt, and then taught at the Musikhochschule Stuttgart from 1964. Among his students was Michael Volle. Jelden was for several years the vocal coach of the Windsbacher Knabenchor.

Jelden died in Stuttgart on 22 September 2004, at the age of 75.
