= Württemberg Chamber Orchestra Heilbronn =

German chamber orchestra

- Chamber orchestra
- Native name: Württembergisches Kammerorchester Heilbronn
- Short name: WKO
- Founded: 1960 by Jörg Faerber
- Location: Heilbronn
- Website: www.wko-heilbronn.de

The Württemberg Chamber Orchestra Heilbronn (German: Württembergisches Kammerorchester Heilbronn, WKO) is a German Chamber Orchestra, located in Heilbronn, Baden Württemberg, Germany.

The orchestra was founded in 1960 by Jörg Faerber and has performed with artists such as Martha Argerich, Alfred Brendel, Rudolf Buchbinder, Maurice André, James Galway, Augustin Hadelich, Hilary Hahn, Gidon Kremer, Sabine Meyer, Anne-Sophie Mutter, Thomas Quasthoff and Tabea Zimmermann. The WKO has recorded more than 500 classical works for the labels Deutsche Grammophon and Teldec.

The orchestra is regularly heard at major festivals such as Salzburg Festival, Vienna Music Summer, Lucerne Festival, Schleswig-Holstein Musik Festival, Schwetzingen Festival and Ludwigsburg Festival.

Ruben Gazarian was artistic director of the orchestra from 2002 to 2018, when he was succeeded by Case Scaglione.
