= Fritz Werner =

German choral conductor, church music director, conductor, organist and composer

- Born: 15 December 1898; Berlin
- Died: 22 December 1977 (aged 79); Heilbronn
- Occupations: Choral conductor; Church music director; Organist; Composer; Kirchenmusikdirektor
- Organization: Heinrich-Schütz-Chor Heilbronn
- Awards: Federal Cross of Merit; Ordre des Arts et des Lettres

Fritz Werner (15 December 1898 – 22 December 1977) was a German choral conductor, church music director, conductor, organist and composer. He founded the Heinrich-Schütz-Chor Heilbronn in 1947 and conducted it until 1973.

== Career ==
Born in Berlin, Werner studied at the Berliner Akademie für Kirchen- und Schulmusik, the University in Berlin and at the Preußische Akademie der Künste. His teachers were Wolfgang Reimann, Arthur Egidi, Fritz Heitmann, Richard Münnich, Carl Stumpf and Georg Schumann (composition, organ), Kurt Schubert (piano), Max Seiffert and Johannes Wolf (history of music), Richard Hagel (conducting). In 1935 he became organist at the Bethlehem Church in Potsdam-Babelsberg and a school teacher. In 1936 he became organist and cantor at St. Nicholas' Church in Potsdam, promoted to Kirchenmusikdirektor (director of church music) in 1938. In 1939 he became music director at Radio Paris. After World War II he was organist and cantor at St. Kilian's Church in Heilbronn from 1946 until 1964. In 1966 he left his collection of music to the town of Heilbronn.

== Heinrich-Schütz-Chor Heilbronn ==
Fritz Werner founded the Heinrich-Schütz-Chor Heilbronn in 1947 and conducted it until 1973. First they concentrated on the music of Heinrich Schütz and made it known in Heilbronn and the region. Later they recorded numerous works of Johann Sebastian Bach, his passions, oratorios, motets and especially more than 50 of his cantatas. Vocal soloists have included Agnes Giebel, Edith Selig, Claudia Hellmann, Barbara Scherler, Hertha Töpper, Theo Altmeyer, Kurt Huber, Helmut Krebs, Jakob Stämpfli, Barry McDaniel, Bruce Abel and Franz Kelch, instrumental soloists Maurice André (trumpet), Hermann Baumann (horn), Marie-Claire Alain (organ) and György Terebesi (violin). Orchestras for the recordings have included the Pforzheim Chamber Orchestra, the Württembergisches Kammerorchester Heilbronn and the Südwestfunk Orchester. Werner's Bach recordings were compared to those of his contemporary Karl Richter. A reviewer wrote about his cantata recordings: "... this wise, discerning and humane Bach conductor has much to teach us, even (perhaps especially) in an age when we are so used to performances of Bach in period style and by small or smallish forces. But the other thing that listening to all these performances has reinforced for me is how endlessly inventive, how eloquent and how moving is the music of Bach. I suspect that Fritz Werner would regard that as the best possible testament to his work." The same reviewer stated about a recording of the St Matthew Passion with Helmut Krebs as the Evangelist: "Werner's pacing of the whole work and his vision of it is compelling. The drama moves inexorably forward and the entire story is most movingly related."

In 1998 the choir celebrated his 100th birthday with a performance of his motets Die Botschaft on Bible words for mixed choir a cappella with soprano, baritone and oboe soloists in the Nikolaikirche Heilbronn, conducted by Michael Böttcher.

== Composer ==
His compositions of more than 50 opus-numbers have included the cantata Trauermusik (1935), Apfelkantate (1939), Symphonie in d (1954), Suite Concertante (1969), Psalmen-Triptychon (1972), a collection of motets Die Botschaft (1973), and concertos for trumpet, horn, piano and violin. His cantata Jesus Christus herrscht als König for choir, brass and timpani was published as well as a piano concerto, Konzertante Musik für Flöte, Oboe und Horn, Symphonische Musik für Streichorchester (music for string orchestra), and the cantata Von der Eitelkeit der Welt (Of the vanity of the world). In 1964 he wrote as his op. 44 an oratorio for Pentecost Veni, sancte spiritus (Come, Holy Spirit) on the sequence Veni sancte spiritus. The Oratorium nach Worten der Heiligen Schrift (oratorio after Bible words) for mixed choir, two solo voices and orchestra was first performed on 16 May 1971. It was published by the Carus-Verlag under the title Veni Sancte Spiritus. The music for string orchestra was premiered by the Württembergisches Kammerorchester Heilbronn on 31 January 1968. His Suite Concertante for high trumpet, string orchestra and percussion op. 48 was recorded right after its premiere on 23 September 1971 with Maurice André and the same chamber orchestra. His Trumpet and Organ Duo op. 53 was recorded several times, for example with Michael Feldner and Petra Morath-Pusinelli or with Malte Burba and Johannes von Erdmann.

Fritz Werner contributed to a revitalisation of church music in Germany in the 20th century, as also Rudolf Mauersberger, Günther Ramin and Johann Nepomuk David.

== Awards ==
- 1973 Bundesverdienstkreuz I. Klasse
- 1974 Chevalier de l’Ordre des Arts et des Lettres

== Sources ==
- Christhard Schrenk: Ein Künstlerleben im 20. Jahrhundert – Fritz Werner (1898–1977). In: Heilbronner Köpfe II. Stadtarchiv Heilbronn, Heilbronn 1999, ISBN 3-928990-70-5 (Kleine Schriftenreihe des Archivs der Stadt Heilbronn. Band 45), p. 191–200 (in German)
