= Pforzheim Chamber Orchestra =

- Chamber orchestra
- Native name: Südwestdeutsches Kammerorchester Pforzheim
- Founded: 1950
- Location: Pforzheim
- Website: www.swdko-pforzheim.de

Pforzheim Chamber Orchestra (full German name: Südwestdeutsches Kammerorchester Pforzheim; full English name: South-west German Chamber Orchestra Pforzheim) is an internationally known German chamber orchestra based in Pforzheim.

== History ==
The orchestra was founded in 1950 by Friedrich Tilegant, a student of Paul Hindemith. It was directed by Paul Angerer from 1971 to 1981, by Vladislav Czarnecki since 1986, by Sebastian Tewinkel from 2002 to 2012. be Timo Handschuh from 2013 to 2019. Since 2019 Douglas Bostock has served as the orchestra's chief conductor and artistic director.

In 1970 the orchestra conducted a composition competition for its twentieth anniversary; the first prize was awarded to Ulrich Stranz.

== Repertoire and recordings ==
The orchestra has recorded numerous works of Johann Sebastian Bach with the Heinrich-Schütz-Chor Heilbronn and conductor Fritz Werner, including several cantatas, the Mass in B minor (in 1957), the St Matthew Passion (1958), the St John Passion (1960), the Christmas Oratorio (1963), and the Easter Oratorio (1964).

It has been instrumental in premieres of works by Boris Blacher, Jean Françaix, Harald Genzmer, and Enjott Schneider.

The orchestra has also recorded the twelve cello concertos of Luigi Boccherini with cellist Julius Berger, a professor at the University of Mainz. A review stated: "Berger is ably assisted in this concerto with sensitive and polished accompaniments from the Southwest German Chamber Orchestra using modern instruments under Maestro Vladislav Czarnecki."
