= Jakob Stämpfli (bass) =

Swiss bass concert singer and academic teacher

- Born: 26 October 1934; Bern
- Died: 28 September 2014 (aged 79); Thun
- Education: Bern Conservatory; Musikhochschule Frankfurt
- Occupations: Classical bass singer; Academic teacher
- Organization: Hochschule für Musik Saar

Jakob Stämpfli (26 October 1934 – 28 September 2014) was a Swiss bass concert singer and an influential academic teacher and director of the conservatory in Bern, also a teacher in Saarbrücken.

== Career ==
Born in Bern, Jakob Stämpfli studied voice at the Bern Conservatory with Jakob Keller and at the Musikhochschule Frankfurt with Paul Lohmann.

His first recording was in 1955 the bass part of Bach's Christmas Oratorio with the Thomanerchor conducted by Günther Ramin. Stämpfli's repertoire includes all the oratorios of Johann Sebastian Bach and more than one hundred Bach cantatas. He recorded especially with the Gächinger Kantorei and Helmuth Rilling, including rarely performed cantatas such as, in 1967, the reconstructed Entfliehet, verschwindet, entweichet, ihr Sorgen, BWV 249a, also called Shepherd cantata. Also in 1967 he recorded the bass arias of Bach's St Matthew Passion with Hans Swarowsky, the Vienna Academy Chamber Choir and the Wiener Sängerknaben, the Vienna State Symphony Orchestra, Heather Harper and Kurt Equiluz singing both the vox Christi and the arias. Jakob Stämpfli recorded Bach cantatas with Karl Ristenpart, also Bach's Magnificat and two of Bach's Missae breves with Maurice André, trumpet. A review of Bach cantatas recorded with conductor Fritz Werner credits his singing: "The magnificent bass aria, ‘Der alte Drache brennt vor Neid’, in which soloist Jakob Stämpfli is accompanied by timpani and no less than three trumpets, is powerfully conveyed; Stämpfli is in commanding form".

In 1963 he recorded Frank Martin's oratorio for soloists, choruses & orchestra In Terra Pax, written in 1944, with Ernest Ansermet conducting the Orchestre de la Suisse Romande.

Jakob Stämpfli was a teacher at the Conservatory of Biel (1960–1962) and at the Bern Conservatory for music and theatre from 1963 where he was appointed director in 1992. He has also taught at the Hochschule für Musik Saar in Saarbrücken and the Hochschule für Musik und Theater Hamburg. He has given international master classes and served as a judge for vocal competitions. His students have included Klaus Mertens, Siegmund Nimsgern, Cornelius Hauptmann and Dominik Wörner.

From 2005 until 2007 he directed the festival Bachwochen Thun – Amsoldingen. In 2007 the festival presented a performance of Bach's Mass in B minor with the ten singers of the Cantus Firmus Vokalensemble in the church of Amsoldingen. He was acting chairman of the Swiss Music Pedagogic Association. He died in Thun.
