= Und es waren Hirten in derselben Gegend, BWV 248 II =

Second cantata of Johann Sebastian Bach's Christmas Oratorio

Und es waren Hirten in derselben Gegend
- Part II of Christmas Oratorio
- Christmas cantata by J. S. Bach
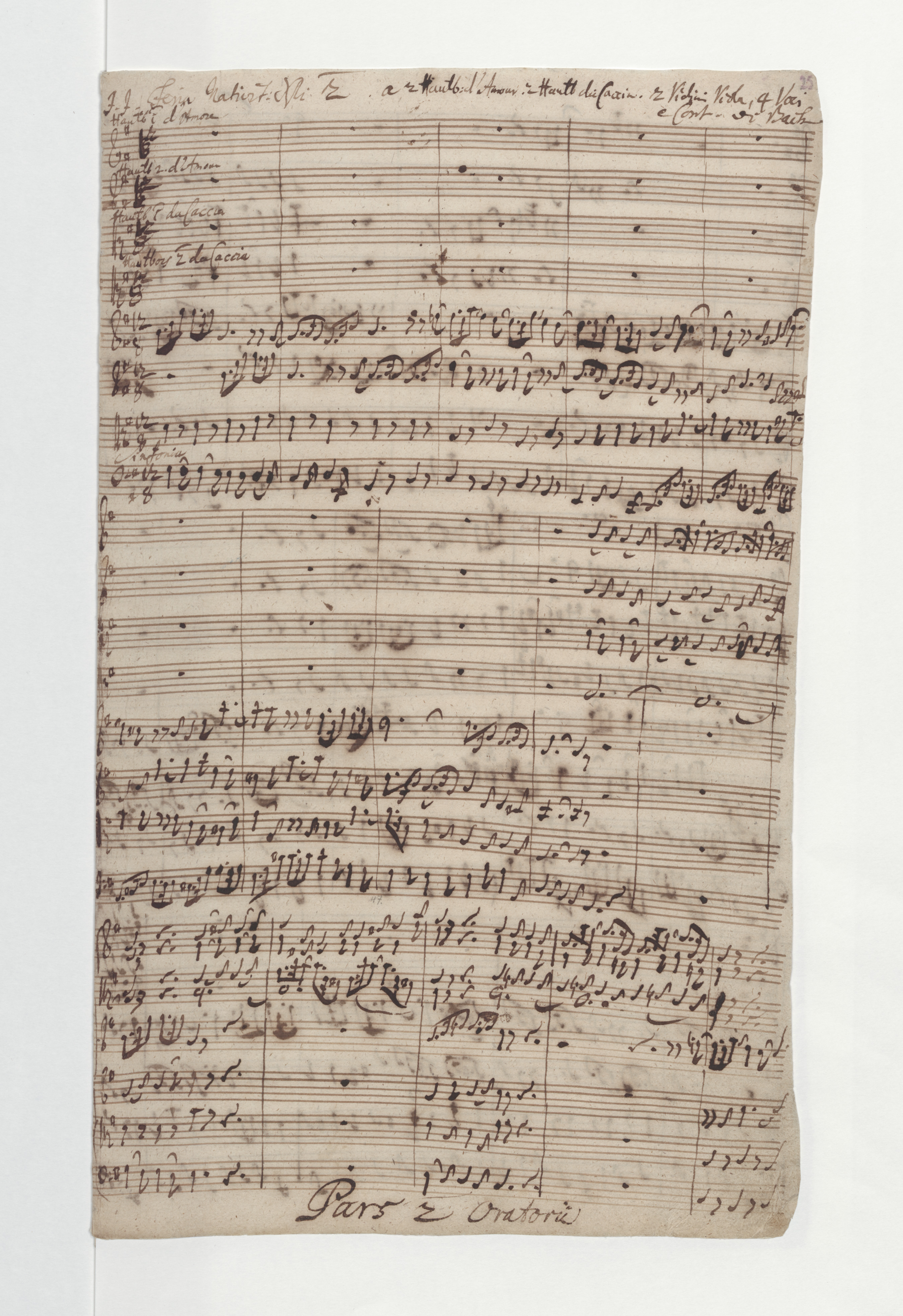
- Autograph of the beginning of the Sinfonia
- Catalogue: BWV 248 II
- Text: Luke 2:8–14
- Performed: 26 December 1734: Leipzig
- Movements: 14
- Vocal: SATB choir and soloists
- Instrumental: 2 traversos; 2 oboes; 2 oboes d'amore; 2 oboes da caccia; 2 violins; viola; cello; violone; continuo

Und es waren Hirten in derselben Gegend ("And there were shepherds in the same environs"), BWV 248^{II} (also written as BWV 248 II), is a 1734 Christmas cantata by Johann Sebastian Bach as the second part of his Christmas Oratorio. Bach was then Thomaskantor, responsible for music at four churches in Leipzig, a position he had assumed in 1723.

The cantata follows the Nativity of Jesus as narrated in the Gospel of Luke. It covers the annunciation to the shepherds. An unknown librettist added text for reflective recitatives and arias and included stanzas from Lutheran hymns. Bach structured the cantata in 14 movements and scored it for four vocal parts and a Baroque orchestra with flutes, oboes and strings. He led the first performances at the two main churches of Leipzig on 26 December 1734 during morning and vespers services.

Part II of the oratorio begins, in contrast to the other parts, with the instrumental Sinfonia, a concerto of shepherds and angels. A tenor soloist narrates the Biblical story in recitative as the Evangelist. The soprano soloist makes a first appearance in the oratorio as the angel, and is followed by the choir representing the angels singing "Glory to God in the Highest". There are three chorales, one by Johann Rist and two by Paul Gerhardt, both using the melody of Luther's "Vom Himmel hoch, da komm ich her".

== History ==
In 18th-century Leipzig, high holidays were celebrated on three consecutive days, with different prescribed readings and related music each day. Christmas, one of these high holidays, was celebrated from 25 to 27 December. For the principal churches, Thomaskirche and Nikolaikirche, the director musices determined which music was to be performed during the services on Sundays and feast days.

On the Second Day of Christmas, 26 December, Leipzig celebrated Christmas in even years and Saint Stephen's Day in uneven years, with different readings. For even years, the epistle for Christmas was Titus 3:4–7 and the gospel was Luke 2:15–20. The theme of the first reading is God's mercy appearing in Christ and that of the second the shepherds at the manger.

=== Bach in Leipzig ===
Bach had become director musices in Leipzig in 1723. Early in his tenure, he had composed these church cantatas for the Second Day of Christmas, which was held as St. Stephen's Day in uneven years:

- 1723: Darzu ist erschienen der Sohn Gottes, BWV 40, part of Bach's first cantata cycle
- 1724: Christum wir sollen loben schon, BWV 121, part of the chorale cantata cycle
- 1725: Selig ist der Mann, BWV 57, part of Bach's third cantata cycle

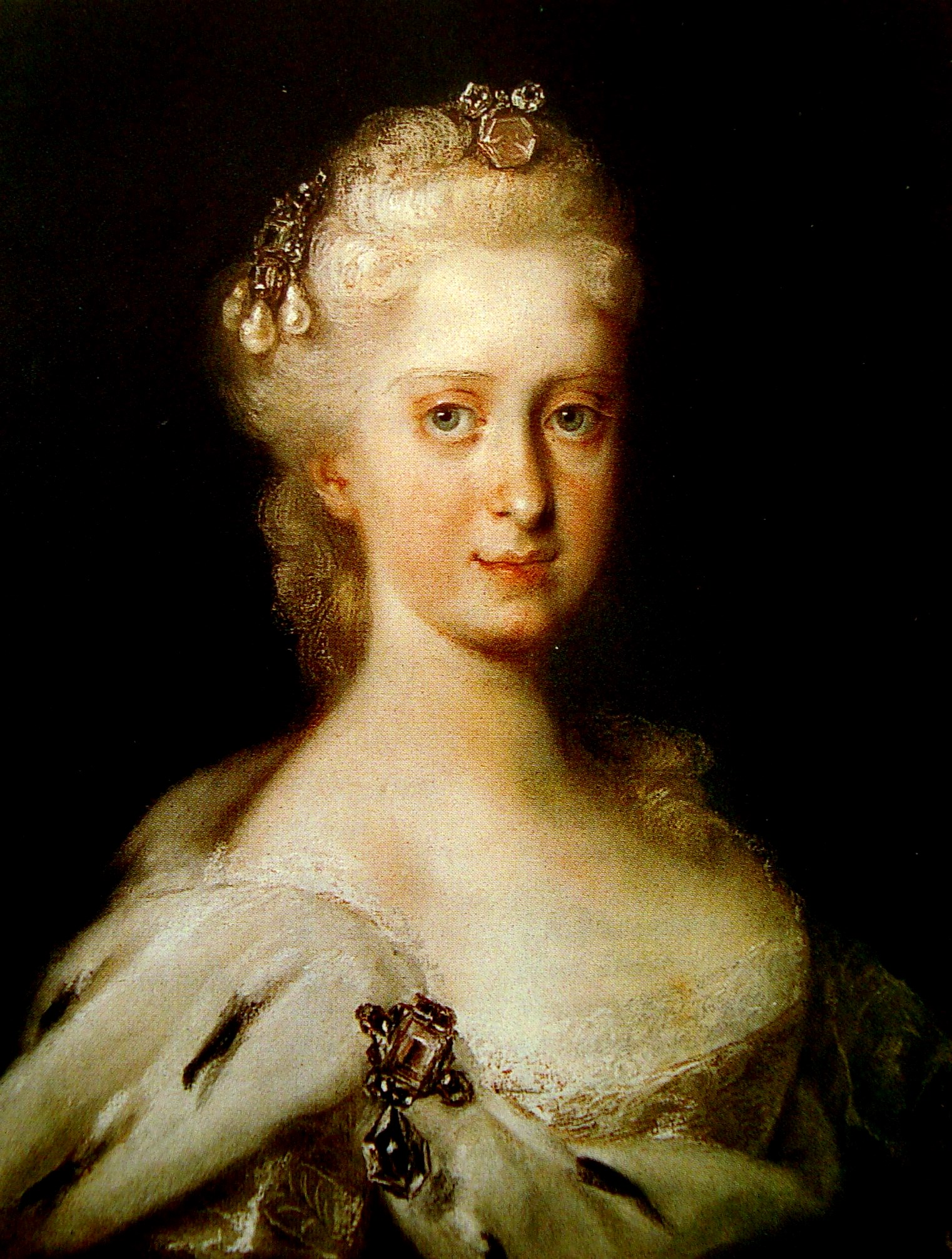
Maria Josepha, the dedicatee of BWV 214, in a 1720 painting by Rosalba Carriera

In 1733, Augustus III of Poland succeeded his father, Augustus the Strong, as Elector of Saxony and took residence in Dresden. Bach hoped to become court composer for the Catholic Elector, and dedicated a Latin Missa to him that year, the Kyrie–Gloria Mass in B minor, BWV 232 I. Several of Bach's secular cantatas celebrating the Saxonian prince-electoral family were performed in Leipzig, including these two cantatas first performed in 1733:

- Laßt uns sorgen, laßt uns wachen, BWV 213, also known as Hercules am Scheidewege (Hercules at the Crossroads), on a libretto by Picander, was performed on 5 September 1733, the 11th birthday of the son of the elector;
- A cantata for the elector's wife, Maria Josepha, to honour her 34th birthday on 8 December: Tönet, ihr Pauken! Erschallet, Trompeten! BWV 214 (Resound, ye drums! Ring out, ye trumpets!). It is also known as "Glückwunschkantate zum Geburtstage der Königin" (Congratulation cantata for the Queen's birthday), although Maria Josepha was not crowned Queen of Poland until January 1734.

=== Christmas season 1734–35 ===
Bach composed his Christmas Oratorio for the Christmas season from Christmas Day on 25 December 1734 to Epiphany on 6 January 1735. Und es waren Hirten in derselben Gegend, BWV 248 II, for the Second Day of Christmas in 1734, is the second of six cantatas (or parts) constituting this oratorio. Its first cantata, Jauchzet, frohlocket! Auf, preiset die Tage, BWV 248 I, had been performed the previous day.

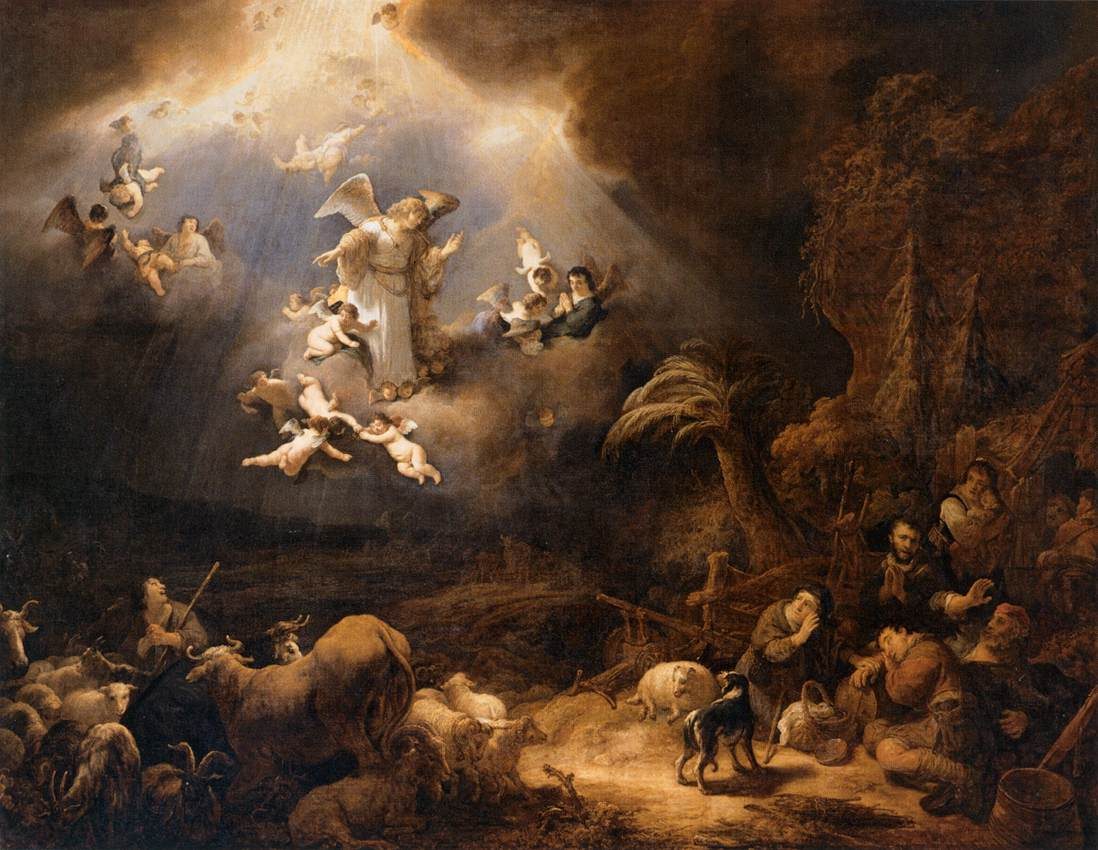
Angels Announcing the Birth of Christ to the Shepherds by Govert Flinck, 1639

While Part I of the oratorio covers the birth of Jesus, Part II is focused on the annunciation to the shepherds. The story is told following the Gospel of Luke, interspersed with reflecting recitatives, arias and chorales. Deviating from the prescribed reading, the text of the cantata covers exclusively the announcement, while the itinerary to Bethlehem and adoration are topics of Part III, Herrscher des Himmels, erhöre das Lallen, BWV 248 III, first performed on the Third Day of Christmas, 27 December 1734.

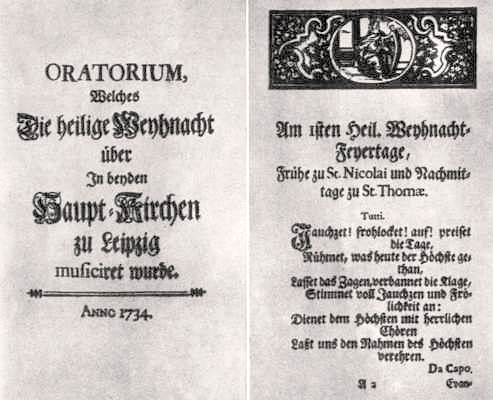
First two pages of the libretto of Bach's Christmas Oratorio, as printed in 1734

The identity of the librettist of the Christmas Oratorio cantatas is unknown, with Picander, who had collaborated with Bach earlier, a likely candidate. The oratorio's libretto was published in 1734. The quotations from the Bible are rendered in Martin Luther's translation. The librettist included three stanzas from Lutheran hymns: Johann Rist's "Brich an, o schönes Morgenlicht" from "Ermuntre dich, mein schwacher Geist", Paul Gerhardt's "Schaut hin! dort liegt im finstern Stall" from "Schaut, schaut, was ist für Wunder dar", as the central movement of the cantata, and for the conclusion, by the same author, "Wir singen dir in deinem Heer" from "Wir singen dir, Immanuel".

The three movements based on Lutheran hymn text used Lutheran chorale tunes associated with these hymns:

- "Ermuntre dich, mein schwacher Geist", Zahn 5741b, by Johann Schop (1641), for the first chorale movement
- "Vom Himmel hoch da komm ich her", Zahn 345–346, by Martin Luther (1539), for the second and third chorale movements

Two extended movements of BWV 248 II are based on music from the BWV 213 and 214 cantatas:

- the sixth movement of BWV 248 II, "Frohe Hirten, eilt, ach eilet", is based on the aria "Fromme Musen! meine Glieder" from BWV 214;
- the tenth movement of the cantata for the Second Day of Christmas 1734, "Schlafe, mein Liebster, genieße der Ruh'", is based on the aria "Schlafe, mein Liebster, und pflege der Ruh" from BWV 213.

BWV 248 II was first performed in the Thomaskirche on 26 December 1734 and repeated during a vespers service at the Nikolaikirche the same day.

== Music ==
=== Structure and scoring ===
The work is structured in 14 movements. Bach scored it for four vocal soloists, a four-part choir (SATB) and a Baroque instrumental ensemble of two traversos (Tra), two oboes d'amore (Oa), two oboes da caccia (Oc), two violins (Vl), viola (Va) and basso continuo. The wind instruments illustrate the sphere of the shepherds. A typical performance takes 29 minutes.

The cantata begins with the instrumental Sinfonia, unlike all other parts of the oratorio. The tenor soloist narrates the story as the Evangelist. The soprano soloist appears for the first time in the oratorio as the angel bringing the news. The choir represents the angels singing "Ehre sei Gott in der Höhe" (Glory to God in the Highest). The scene is reflected in two arias, an alto aria anticipating a lullaby for the newborn and a tenor aria calling to run to the manger in joy.

The following table follows the Neue Bach-Ausgabe (New Bach Edition). The numbers are continuous for the complete Christmas Oratorio, beginning with 10 for its second cantata. The keys and time signatures are from Alfred Dürr and use the symbol for common time. The continuo, played throughout, is not shown.

Movements of Und es waren Hirten in derselben Gegend
No.	Title	Text	Type	Vocal	Winds	Strings	Key	Time
10	Sinfonia				2Tra 2Oa 2Oc	2Vl Va	G major	12/8
11	Und es waren Hirten in derselben Gegend	Luke 2:8–9	Recitative	T				
12	Brich an, o schönes Morgenlicht	Rist	Chorale	SATB	2Tra 2Oa 2Oc	2Vl Va	G major	common time
13	Und der Engel sprach zu ihnen Fürchtet euch nicht	Luke 2:10-11	Recitative	T S		2Vl Va		
14	Was Gott dem Abraham verheißen	anon.	Recitative	B	2Oa 2Oc	2Vl Va		
15	Frohe Hirten, eilt, ach eilet	anon.	Aria	T	Tra		E minor	3/8
16	Und das habt zum Zeichen	Luke 2:12	Recitative	T				
17	Schaut hin! dort liegt im finstern Stall	Gerhardt	Chorale	SATB	2Tra 2Oa 2Oc	2Vl Va	C major	common time
18	So geht denn hin!	anon.	Recitative	B	2Ob 2Oc			
19	Schlafe, mein Liebster, genieße der Ruh	anon.	Aria	A	Tra 2Oa 2Oc	2Vl Va	G Major	2/4
20	Und alsobald war da bei dem Engel	Luke 2:13	Recitative	T				
21	Ehre sei Gott in der Höhe	Luke 2:14	Chorus	SATB	2Tra 2Oa 2Oc		G major	cut time
22	So recht, ihr Engel, jauchzt und singet	anon.	Recitative	B				
23	Wir singen dir in deinem Heer	Gerhardt	Chorale	SATB	2Tra 2Oa 2Oc	2Vl Va	G major	12/8

=== Movements ===
==== 10 ====
Sinfonia, BWV 248 II
St Matthew's Concert Choir and Orchestra, dir. Phiroz Dalal

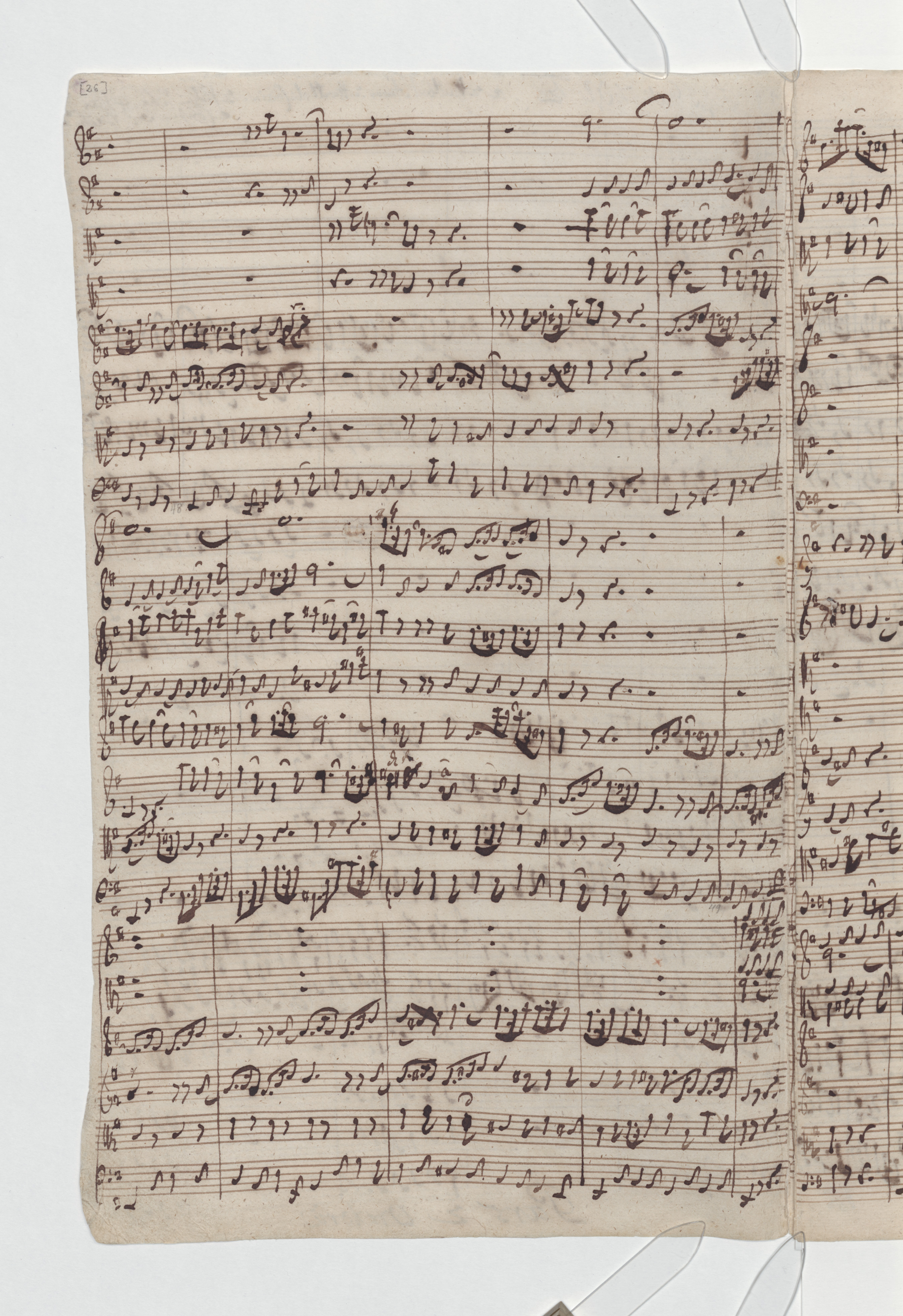
Second page of Sinfonia

The cantata begins with the instrumental Sinfonia. Set in G major, it is in a triple meter in siciliano rhythm. Albert Schweitzer likened the music to a concerto of the shepherds, playing oboes, and the angels playing strings and flute in unison with the first violin. The movement is a ternary form, ABA^{'}, repeating the beginning modified after a middle section, and this a forerunner of the classical sonata form, as Dürr notes. Each section is in again three groups, taking the analogy to the sonata form further: string music, as a first theme, is followed by oboe music as a second theme and combined music as the closing group. The movement is the only purely instrumental music in the Christmas Oratorio.

The absence of a chorus in the first movement signifies the stillness of the nightly scene, giving more weight to the voices to follow. The major choral movement in this cantata is the representation of the angels' song.

==== 11 ====
The tenor soloist as the Evangelist begins the narration in secco recitative after Luke: "Und es waren Hirten in derselben Gegend" ("And there were shepherds in the same region"), describing the shepherds in the fields, frightened by the apparition of angels.

==== 12 ====
Chorus: "Brich an, o schönes Morgenlicht"
St Matthew's Concert Choir and Orchestra, dir. Phiroz Dalal

In the response to the shepherds being afraid, they are told in a chorale not to fear. The stanza "Brich an, o schönes Morgenlicht" ("Break forth, o lovely light of morning"), which Bach set for four parts, is taken from a hymn by Johann Rist, "Ermuntre dich, mein schwacher Geist":

Brich an, o schönes Morgenlicht,
Und laß den Himmel tagen!
Du Hirtenvolk, erschrecke nicht,
Weil dir die Engel sagen,
Daß dieses schwache Knäbelein
Soll unser Trost und Freude sein,
Dazu den Satan zwingen
Und letztlich Friede bringen!

The shepherds are told that the weak child shall be comfort and joy to them and all (using the first person plural) and will conquer Satan and ultimately bring peace. Markus Rathey notes that this is an apocalyptic outlook within the oratorio.

==== 13 ====
The narration continues, first sung by the Evangelist, "Und der Engel sprach zu ihnen" ("And the angel said to them"), then continued by the angel's message, given to the soprano soloist, who appears here for the first time in the oratorio: "Fürchtet euch nicht" ("Do not be afraid"). The angel's recitative is accompanied by strings.

==== 14 ====
The announcement of the angel is interrupted after telling of the birth of the Saviour, by a recitative and following aria. The bass sings the recitative, accompanied by the oboes representing the shepherds: "Was Gott dem Abraham verheißen" ("What God promised to Abraham"). It connects the message to the shepherds to Abraham, who also was a shepherd.

==== 15 ====
Tenor aria: "Frohe Hirten, eilt, ach eilet"
St Matthew's Concert Choir and Orchestra, dir. Phiroz Dalal

The tenor sings an aria, calling the other shepherds to run to see the child: "Frohe Hirten, eilt, ach eilet" ("Joyful shepherds, hurry, oh hurry"). The aria in E minor is accompanied by solo flute. The music is based on the aria "Fromme Musen, meine Glieder" from Bach's secular cantata Tönet, ihr Pauken! Erschallet, Trompeten!, BWV 214, for the birthday of Maria Josepha, Electress of Saxony.

==== 16 ====
The announcement of the angel is continued: "Und das habt zum Zeichen" ("And this shall be a sign for you"), mentioning swaddling-clothes and the manger. The movement is marked to be sung by the tenor, which shows, according to Dürr, the "essentially undramatic conception of the oratorio".

==== 17 ====
Chorale: "Schaut hin! dort liegt im finstern Stall"
St Matthew's Concert Choir and Orchestra, dir. Phiroz Dalal

At this point, the lowliness of the humble stable is reflected in a chorale: "Schaut hin! dort liegt im finstern Stall" (Look, there lies in a dark stable), a setting for four parts of a stanza by Paul Gerhardt, which is sung to the melody of Martin Luther's "Vom Himmel hoch, da komm ich her". This chorale, in the low key of C major, is the central movement of this cantata and thus also the midpoint of the first three parts of the oratorio, performed on the three days of Christmas:

Schaut hin, dort liegt im finstern Stall,
Des Herrschaft gehet überall!
Da Speise vormals sucht ein Rind,
Da ruhet itzt der Jungfrau'n Kind.

Its focus is on the dark stable, expressing amazement that the Almighty, the Virgin's child, rests where a cow had fed. Bach illustrates power over all by a rising scale of more than an octave in the bass line.

==== 18 ====
Another reflecting recitative of the bass, again interrupting the Biblical account, calls the shepherds to go and marvel: "So geht denn hin, ihr Hirten, geht" ("Then go forth, you shepherds, go"),. It is accompanied by the oboes as the first bass recitative.

==== 19 ====
Alto aria: "Schlafe, mein Liebster, genieße der Ruh"
St Matthew's Concert Choir and Orchestra, dir. Phiroz Dalal

The aria is assigned to the alto voice. It is a lullaby, as if imagined: "Schlafe, mein Liebster, genieße der Ruh" ("Sleep, my most beloved, enjoy your rest"). Set in G major, the voice is doubled by a flute playing an octave higher, and all oboes and strings. Bach based the music on "Schlafe, mein Liebster", a soprano aria from Laßt uns sorgen, laßt uns wachen, BWV 213.

==== 20 ====
The Evangelist continues the narration: "Und alsobald war da bei dem Engel" ("And suddenly there was with the angel"), telling of the heavenly hosts.

==== 21 ====
Chorus: "Ehre sei Gott in der Höhe und Friede auf Erden und den Menschen ein Wohlgefallen."
St Matthew's Concert Choir and Orchestra, dir. Phiroz Dalal

The choir represents the angels singing the words after Luke: "Ehre sei Gott in der Höhe und Friede auf Erden und den Menschen ein Wohlgefallen." ("Glory to God on high and peace on Earth and goodwill towards mankind."). Bach treats the three aspects differently, as in a motet. The instruments only accompany. The first section, about glory, is developed in dense polyphony based on a passacaglia-type bass. The second section, about peace, is set to a pedal point. The third section, about goodwill, has lively themes full of coloraturas. After each idea has received extended treatment, the full text is repeated in the same sequence but condensed.

==== 22 ====
The bass sings a third recitative, this time secco: "So recht, ihr Engel, jauchzt und singet" ("Quite right, you angels, rejoice and sing"), calling to joyfully join the angels' song.

==== 23 ====
Chorale: "Wir singen dir in deinem Heer"
St Matthew's Concert Choir and Orchestra, dir. Phiroz Dalal

The closing chorale is another stanza by Gerhardt, to the same melody as the cantata's central chorale: "Wir singen dir in deinem Heer" ("We sing to You within Your host"):

Wir singen dir in deinem Heer
Aus aller Kraft Lob, Preis und Ehr,
Daß du, o lang gewünschter Gast,
Dich nunmehr eingestellet hast.

Using the first person plural, it includes everyone in singing praises with the angels because the long-awaited guest has finally appeared. The chorale is set in G major, and instrumental motifs between the lines are taken from the opening Sinfonia, confirming the symmetry of the cantata's structure. The strings play in unison with the choir.

== See also ==
- Christmas Oratorio discography

== Cited sources ==
Bach Digital

- "Christum wir sollen loben schon BWV 121: Chorale cantata (2nd Christmas Day)". Bach Digital. Leipzig: Bach Archive; et al. 2019-03-11.
- "Darzu ist erschienen der Sohn Gottes BWV 40: Sacred cantata (2nd Christmas Day)". Bach Digital. Leipzig: Bach Archive; et al. 2019-03-11.
- "D-LEm I. B. 2a". Bach Digital. Leipzig: Bach Archive; et al. 2018-09-08.
- "Ermuntre dich, mein schwacher Geist BWV 248/12". Bach Digital. Leipzig: Bach Archive; et al. 2018-07-15.
- "Lasst uns sorgen, lasst uns wachen (Dramma per musica) BWV 213: Secular cantata". Bach Digital. Leipzig: Bach Archive; et al. 2019-03-11.
- "Selig ist der Mann, der die Anfechtung erduldet (Dialogus) BWV 57: Sacred cantata (2nd Christmas Day)". Bach Digital. Leipzig: Bach Archive; et al. 2019-03-11.
- "Tönet, ihr Pauken! Erschallet, Trompeten! BWV 214: Secular cantata (Birthday)". Bach Digital. Leipzig: Bach Archive; et al. 2019-03-11.
- "Und es waren Hirten in derselben Gegend (Christmas oratorio, part 2) BWV 248 II". Bach Digital. Leipzig: Bach Archive; et al. 2019-03-11.
- "Vom Himmel hoch, da komm ich her BWV 248/17". Bach Digital. Leipzig: Bach Archive; et al. 2019-01-18.
- "Vom Himmel hoch da komm ich her BWV 248/23". Bach Digital. Leipzig: Bach Archive; et al. 2019-01-17.

Books

- Buelow, George J. (2016). "The Late Baroque Era". The Late Baroque Era: Vol 4. From The 1680s To 1740. Springer. ISBN 978-1-34-911303-3.
- Bossuyt, Ignace (2004). Johann Sebastian Bach, Christmas Oratorio (BWV 248). Leuven University Press. ISBN 978-9-05-867421-0.
- Dürr, Alfred; Jones, Richard D. P. (2006). The Cantatas of J. S. Bach: With Their Librettos in German-English Parallel Text. Oxford University Press. pp. 118–121. ISBN 978-0-19-929776-4.
- Hofmann, Klaus, ed. (2005). Johann Sebastian Bach: Weihnachtsoratorium / Christmas Oratorio / Oratorium Tempore Nativitatis Christi / BWV 248 (PDF) (Urtext, Vocal score). Stuttgarter Bach-Ausgaben (in German, English, and French). Translated by Coombs, John. Continuo realisation by Horn, Paul, English version by Drinker, Henry S. Carus. CV 31.248/53.
- Rathey, Markus (2016). Johann Sebastian Bach's Christmas Oratorio: Music, Theology, Culture. Oxford University Press. pp. 148–152. ISBN 978-0-19-027526-6.
- Wessel, Jens (2015). "Köthen (1717–1723)" (PDF). J. S. Bach und die italienische Oper / Drammi per musica für das kurfürstlich-sächsische und polnische Königshaus zwischen 1733 und 1736 (dissertation) (in German). Hochschule für Musik und Theater Hamburg. pp. 25–44, 47, 99–100.
- Wolff, Christoph (2002). Johann Sebastian Bach: The Learned Musician. W. W. Norton & Company. ISBN 978-0-393-32256-9.
- Zahn, Johannes (1889–1893). Die Melodien der deutschen evangelischen Kirchenlieder (in German). Gütersloh: Bertelsmann. Vol. I, Vol. II, Vol. III, Vol. IV, Vol. V, Vol. VI

Online sources

- Bischof, Walter F. (2019). "BWV 248II Und es waren Hirten in derselben Gegend / Weihnachts-Oratorium I". University of Alberta.
- Dahn, Luke (2019). "BWV 248.12". bach-chorales.com.
- Dahn, Luke (2019). "BWV 248.17". bach-chorales.com.
- Dahn, Luke (2019). "BWV 248.23". bach-chorales.com.
- Dellal, Pamela (2021). "BWV 248-II – "Und es waren Hirten in derselben Gegend"". pameladellal.com.
- Rathey, Markus (18 April 2003). "Johann Sebastian Bach's Mass in B Minor: The Greatest Artwork of All Times and All People" (PDF). ism.yale.edu. Archived from the original (PDF) on 15 July 2014.
