= Christmas Oratorio =

1734 oratorio by Johann Sebastian Bach

- BWV 248
- Cycle of six Christmas cantatas by J. S. Bach
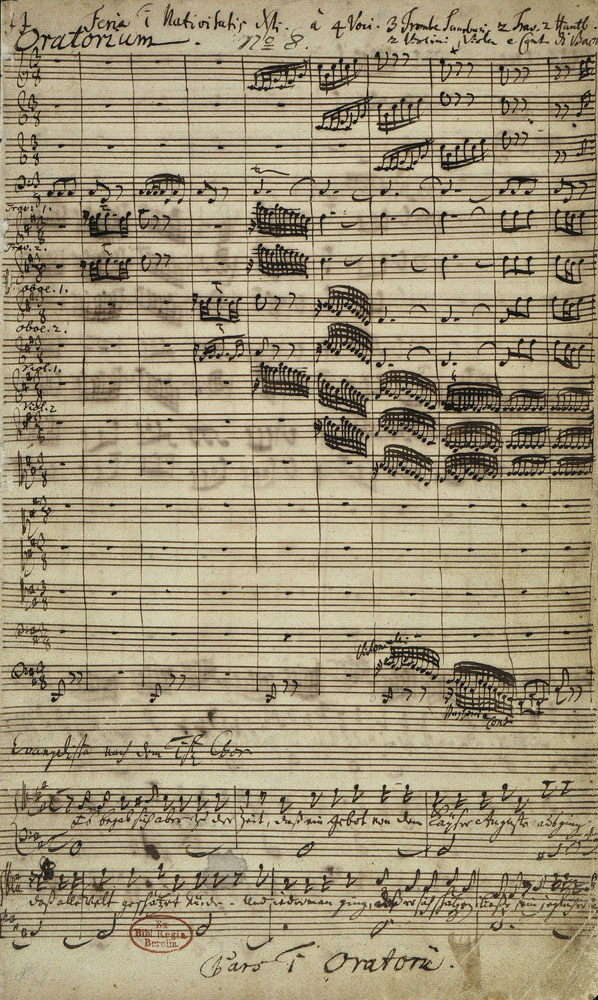
- First page of the manuscript of the score
- Related: Earlier secular cantatas
- Occasion: Christmas
- Text: Biblical text from the Gospels of Luke and Matthew; Lutheran hymns; Poetry attributed to Picander
- Language: German
- Performed: 25 December 1734 to 6 January 1735, Leipzig
- Movements: 64 in six parts
- Vocal: SATB choir and soloists
- Instrumental: 3 trumpets; 2 horns; timpani; 2 traversos; 2 oboes; 2 oboes d'amore; 2 violins; viola; cello; violone; continuo

The Christmas Oratorio (German: Weihnachtsoratorium), BWV 248, is an oratorio by Johann Sebastian Bach intended for performance in church during the Christmas season. It is in six parts, each part a cantata intended for performance in a church service on a feast day of the Christmas period. It was written for the Christmas season of 1734 and incorporates music from earlier compositions, including three secular cantatas written during 1733 and 1734 and a largely lost church cantata, BWV 248a. The date is confirmed in Bach's autograph manuscript. The next complete public performance was not until 17 December 1857 by the Sing-Akademie zu Berlin under Eduard Grell. The Christmas Oratorio is a particularly sophisticated example of parody music. The author of the text is unknown, although a likely collaborator was Christian Friedrich Henrici (Picander).

The work belongs to a group of three oratorios written in 1734 and 1735 for major feasts, the other two works being the Ascension Oratorio (BWV 11) and the Easter Oratorio (BWV 249). All three of these oratorios to some degree parody earlier compositions. The Christmas Oratorio is by far the longest and most complex work of the three.

The first part (for Christmas Day) describes the birth of Jesus; the second (for 26 December) the annunciation to the shepherds; the third (for 27 December) the adoration of the shepherds; the fourth (for New Year's Day) the circumcision and naming of Jesus; the fifth (for the first Sunday after New Year) the journey of the Magi; and the sixth (for Epiphany) the adoration of the Magi.

The running time for the entire oratorio is around three hours. In concert performance, it is often presented split into two parts.

== History ==
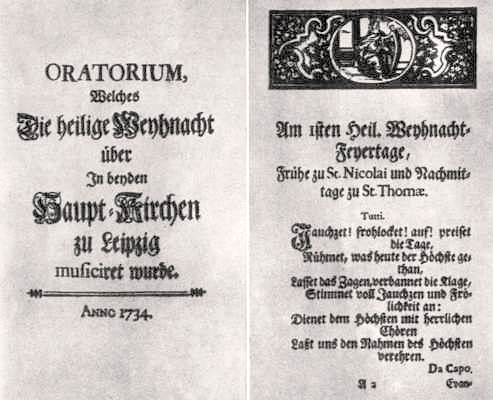
First two pages of the libretto of Bach's Christmas Oratorio, as printed in 1734.

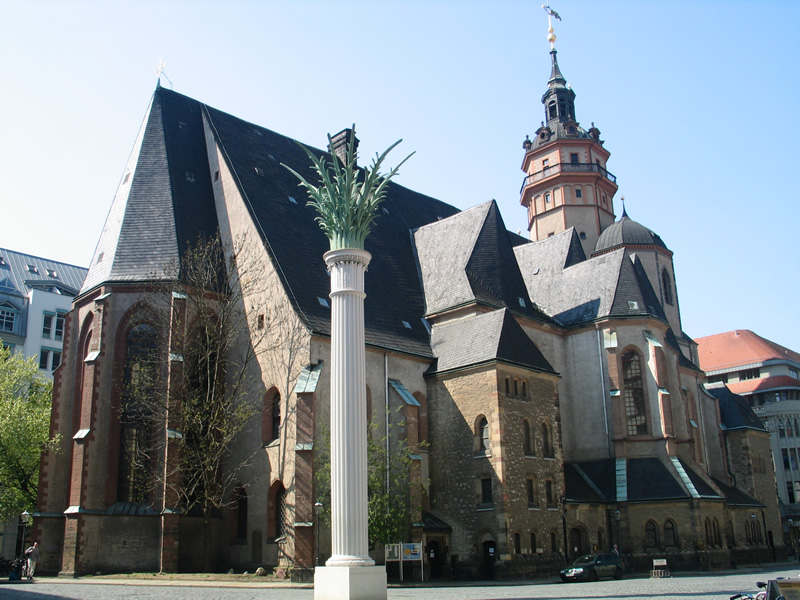
St. Nicholas Church

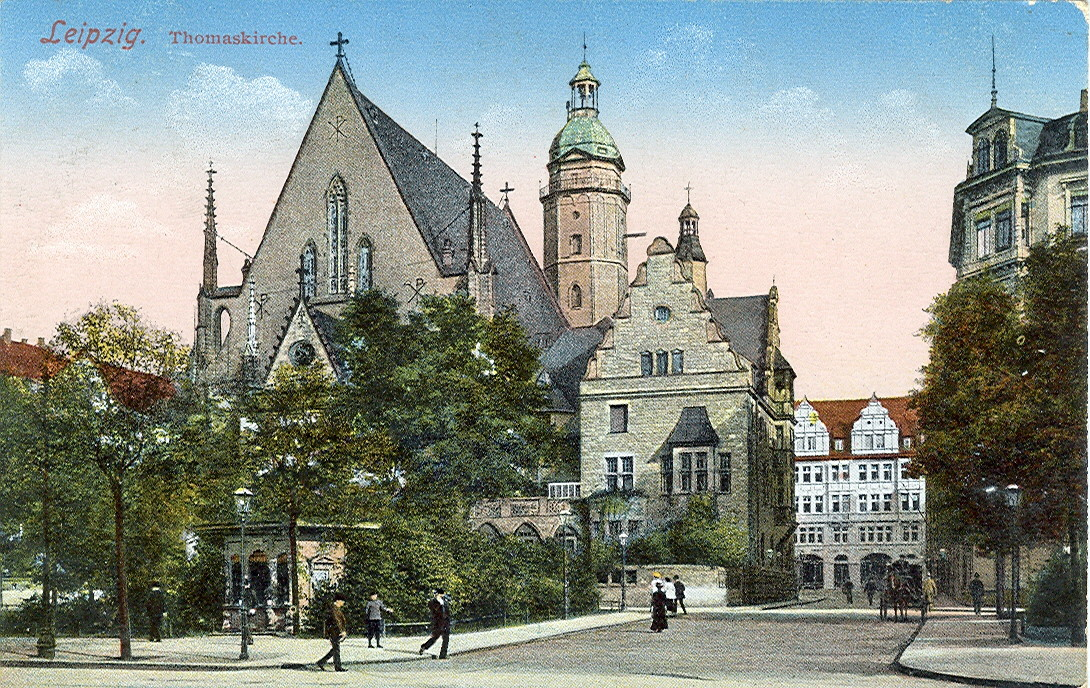
St. Thomas Church

As in the Catholic tradition, in the liturgical calendar of the German reformation era in Saxony, the Christmas season started on 25 December (Christmas Day) and ended on 6 January (Epiphany). It was preceded by Advent, and followed by the period of the Sundays after Epiphany. It included at least three feast days that called for festive music during religious services: apart from Christmas (Nativity of Christ) and Epiphany (Visit of the Magi) the period also included New Year's Day (1 January), in Bach's time still often referred to as the Feast of the Circumcision of Christ. Also 26 and 27 December (second and third day of Christmas) were commonly considered feast days, with festive music in church. If a Sunday fell between 27 December and 1 January, also on this first Sunday after Christmas a church service with music was held, and similar for a Sunday between 1 and 6 January (second Sunday after Christmas, or: first Sunday after New Year).

=== 1714–1729 ===
Before Bach composed his Christmas Oratorio for the 1734–35 Christmas season in Leipzig, he had already composed Christmas cantatas and other church music for all seven occasions of the Christmas season:

- Before his Leipzig period he composed, as part of his Weimar cantata cycle:
  - Christmas, 25 December 1714: Christen, ätzet diesen Tag, BWV 63.
  - First Sunday after Christmas, 30 December 1714: Tritt auf die Glaubensbahn, BWV 152.
- For the 1723–24 Christmas season, during his first year as musical director of Leipzig's principal churches:
  - Christmas Day: repeat performance of BWV 63, which thus became part of his first cantata cycle, and, as part of the Latin Church music he composed for Leipzig, his Magnificat, BWV 243a (version with Christmas interpolations) and Sanctus in D major, BWV 238.
  - Second Day of Christmas: Darzu ist erschienen der Sohn Gottes, BWV 40.
  - Third Day of Christmas: Sehet, welch eine Liebe hat uns der Vater erzeiget, BWV 64.
  - New Year's Day: Singet dem Herrn ein neues Lied, BWV 190.
  - Second Sunday after Christmas (2 January): Schau, lieber Gott, wie meine Feind, BWV 153.
  - Epiphany: Sie werden aus Saba alle kommen, BWV 65.
- For the 1724–25 Christmas season, as part of his chorale cantata cycle (except for the Latin Sanctus):
  - Christmas Day: Gelobet seist du, Jesu Christ, BWV 91 (early version), and Sanctus for six vocal parts, BWV 232/III (early version).
  - Second Day of Christmas: Christum wir sollen loben schon, BWV 121.
  - Third Day of Christmas: Ich freue mich in dir, BWV 133.
  - First Sunday after Christmas (31 December): Das neugeborne Kindelein, BWV 122.
  - New Year's Day: Jesu, nun sei gepreiset, BWV 41.
  - Epiphany: Liebster Immanuel, Herzog der Frommen, BWV 123.
- Cantatas of Bach's third cantata cycle, for the Christmas seasons of 1725–26 and 1726–27:
  - Christmas Day (1725): Unser Mund sei voll Lachens, BWV 110.
  - Second Day of Christmas (1725): Selig ist der Mann, BWV 57.
  - Third Day of Christmas (1725): Süßer Trost, mein Jesus kömmt, BWV 151.
  - First Sunday after Christmas (30 December 1725): Gottlob! nun geht das Jahr zu Ende, BWV 28.
  - New Year's Day (1726): Herr Gott, dich loben wir, BWV 16.
  - Second Sunday after Christmas (5 January 1727): Ach Gott, wie manches Herzeleid, BWV 58 (early version).

Four of these third cycle cantatas for the Christmas season, BWV 110, 57, 151 and 16, were on a text from Georg Christian Lehms's Gottgefälliges Kirchen-Opffer cantata libretto cycle, which had been published in 1711. In the second half of the 1720s Bach often collaborated with Picander as a librettist for his cantatas. The Shepherd Cantata, BWV 249a, first performed on 23 February 1725, one of Bach's secular cantatas, is an early example of such cantata. Bach reused the music of this cantata in the 1725 first version of his Easter Oratorio. Ihr Häuser des Himmels, ihr scheinenden Lichter, BWV 193a, composed in 1727, is another secular cantata on a text by Picander which was, shortly after its first performance, reworked into a sacred cantata (Ihr Tore zu Zion, BWV 193). In 1728–29 Picander published a cantata libretto cycle, leading to at least two further Christmas season cantatas by Bach:

- Christmas Day 1728, or possibly 1729: Ehre sei Gott in der Höhe, BWV 197a.
- New Year's Day 1729: Gott, wie dein Name, so ist auch dein Ruhm, BWV 171, with music in part adapted from the secular cantata, likewise on a text by Picander, Zerreißet, zersprenget, zertrümmert die Gruft, BWV 205.

A Christmas oratorio presented as a cycle of six cantatas, to be performed on several days during the Christmas period, was not uncommon in Bach's day: Gottfried Heinrich Stölzel, whose church music was not unknown to Bach and Leipzig churchgoers, had composed such Christmas oratorios in 1719 and 1728.

=== 1730s ===
==== Models from earlier compositions ====
In the early 1730s, Bach composed a number of secular cantatas, including:

- So kämpfet nur, ihr muntern Töne, BWV 1160, on a libretto by Picander, first performed on 25 August 1731 (music lost, apart from later versions of the opening chorus).
- Laßt uns sorgen, laßt uns wachen, BWV 213 (Hercules at the Crossroads), on a libretto by Picander, performed on 5 September 1733.
- Tönet, ihr Pauken! Erschallet, Trompeten!, BWV 214, performed on 8 December 1733.
- Preise dein Glücke, gesegnetes Sachsen, BWV 215, performed on 5 October 1734.

Movements from the BWV 213, 214 and 215 cantatas form the basis of several movements of the Christmas Oratorio. In addition to these sources, the sixth cantata is based on a largely lost church cantata, BWV 248a, of which at least the opening chorus is based on the lost secular cantata BWV 1160. The trio aria in Part V "Ach, wenn wird die Zeit erscheinen?" is believed to be from a similarly lost source, and the chorus from the same section "Wo ist der neugeborne König" is from the 1731 St Mark Passion, BWV 247.

Cantata movements reused in Christmas Oratorio
Cantata	Movement	Type	BWV 248	Movement
BWV 213/1	Lasst uns sorgen, lasst uns wachen	Chorus (SATB)	36 (IV/1)	Fallt mit Danken, fallt mit Loben
BWV 213/3	Schlafe, mein Liebster, und pflege der Ruh	Aria (s→a)	19 (II/10)	Schlafe, mein Liebster, genieße der Ruh
BWV 213/5	Treues Echo dieser Orten	Aria (a→s)	39 (IV/4)	Flößt, mein Heiland, flößt dein Namen
BWV 213/7	Auf meinen Flügeln sollst du schweben	Aria (t)	41 (IV/6)	Ich will nur dir zu Ehren leben
BWV 213/9	Ich will dich nicht hören	Aria (a)	4 (I/4)	Bereite, dich, Zion
BWV 213/11	Ich bin deine, du bist meine	Duet (at→sb)	29 (III/6)	Herr, dein Mitleid, dein Erbarmen
BWV 214/1	Tönet, ihr Pauken! Erschallet, Trompeten	Chorus (SATB)	1 (I/1)	Jauchzet, frohlocket, auf, preiset die Tage
BWV 214/5	Fromme Musen! meine Glieder	Aria (a→t)	15 (II/6)	Frohe Hirten, eilt, ach eilet
BWV 214/7	Kron und Preis gekrönter Damen	Aria (b)	8 (I/8)	Großer Herr, o starker König
BWV 214/9	Blühet, ihr Linden in Sachsen, wie Zedern	Chorus (SATB)	24 (III/1&13)	Herrscher des Himmels, erhöre das Lallen
BWV 215/7	Durch die von Eifer entflammten Waffen	Aria (s→b)	47 (V/5)	Erleucht auch meine finstre Sinnen
BWV 247/43	Pfui dich, wie fein zerbrichst du den Tempel	Chorus (SATB)	45 (V/3)	Wo ist der neugeborne König der Juden
BWV 248a/1	—	Chorus (SATB)	54 (VI/1)	Herr, wenn die stolzen Feinde schnauben
BWV 248a/2	—	Recitative (→s)	56 (VI/3)	Du Falscher, suche nur den Herrn zu fällen
BWV 248a/3	—	Aria (→s)	57 (VI/4)	Nur ein Wink von seinen Händen
BWV 248a/4	—	Recitative (→t)	61 (VI/8)	So geht! Genug, mein Schatz geht nicht von hier
BWV 248a/5	—	Aria (→t)	62 (VI/9)	Nun mögt ihr stolzen Feinde schrecken
BWV 248a/6	—	Recitative (→satb)	63 (VI/10)	Was will der Höllen Schrecken nun
BWV 248a/7	—	Chorus (SATB)	64 (VI/11)	Nun seid ihr wohl gerochen
?	—	Trio (→sat)	51 (V/9)	Ach! wann wird die Zeit erscheinen?

==== Chorales ====
Like for most of his German-language church music, Bach used Lutheran hymns, and their Lutheran chorale tunes, in his Christmas Oratorio. The first chorale tune appears in the 5th movement of Part I: it is the tune known as Herzlich tut mich verlangen, that is, the same hymn tune which Bach used in his St Matthew Passion for setting several stanzas of Paul Gerhardt's "O Haupt voll Blut und Wunden" ("O Sacred Head, Now Wounded"). The same melody reappears in the last movement of the oratorio (No. 64, closing chorale of Part VI). In the oratorio there is, however, no association with the pain and suffering evoked in the Passion.

Martin Luther's 1539 "Vom Himmel hoch, da komm ich her" melody appears in three chorales: twice on a text by Paul Gerhardt in Part II of the oratorio, and the first time, in the closing chorale of Part I, with the 13th stanza of Luther's hymn as text. A well-known English version of that stanza is "Oh, my dear heart, young Jesus sweet", the first stanza of "Balulalow", as, for instance, sung in 2009 by English musician Sting:

Ach mein herzliebes Jesulein,
Mach dir ein rein sanft Bettelein,
Zu ruhn in meines Herzens Schrein,
Dass ich nimmer vergesse dein!

— lyrics of Christmas Oratorio, Part I
Translation:

Oh, my deir hert, young Jesus sweit,
Prepare thy creddil in my spreit,
And I sall rock thee in my hert,
And never mair from thee depart.

— Popular rhymes of Scotland, p. 13

The Christmas Oratorio is exceptional in that it contains a few hymn settings, or versions of hymn tunes, for which there is no known earlier source than Bach's composition:

- The chorale melody used in No. 33 of the oratorio appears to be based on Johann Georg Ebeling's 1666 "Warum sollt ich mich denn grämen" hymn tune. The Zahn number of Ebeling's original is 6456a. Bach's Christmas Oratorio version of the tune is Zahn 6462, first printed in 1769 as No. 143 in the second volume of Bach's four-part chorales published by Birnstiel.
- No. 38 and 40 set the first stanza of Johann Rist's "Jesu, du mein liebstes Leben" hymn text: the setting is Bach's – it is not based on any known pre-existing hymn tune.
- The tune used for Johann Rist's "Hilf, Herr Jesu, lass gelingen" hymn text in No. 42 of the oratorio appears to be an original composition by Bach. It is mentioned as such in the last volume of Johannes Zahn's Die Melodien der deutschen evangelischen Kirchenlieder, as first of four late additions to his catalogue of German Evangelical hymn tunes.

There are very few known hymn tunes by Bach (he used Lutheran hymn tunes in the large majority of his sacred compositions, but rarely one of his own invention): apart from what can be found in the Christmas Oratorio, there appears to be one, partly inspired by a pre-existing melody, in the motet Komm, Jesu, komm, BWV 229 (composed before 1731–32), and at least one entirely by Bach, "Vergiss mein nicht, vergiss mein nicht", BWV 505, in Schemellis Gesangbuch (published in 1736).

Chorales in Christmas Oratorio
Author	Date	Hymn; stanza	Stanza incipit	Melody	Composer	Date	Zahn	BWV 248
Gerhardt	1653	Wie soll ich dich empfangen; 1	Wie soll ich dich empfangen	Herzlich tut mich verlangen	Hassler	1601	5385a	5 (I/5)
Luther	1524	Gelobet seist du, Jesu Christ; 6	Er ist auf Erden kommen arm	Gelobet seist du, Jesu Christ	Luther	1524	1947	7 (I/7)
Luther	1535	Vom Himmel hoch, da komm ich her; 13	Ach mein herzliebes Jesulein	Vom Himmel hoch, da komm ich her	Luther	1539	346	9 (I/9)
Rist	1641	Ermuntre dich, mein schwacher Geist; 9	Brich an, o schönes Morgenlicht	Ermuntre dich, mein schwacher Geist	Schop/Crüger	1648	5741b	12 (II/3)
Gerhardt	1667	Schaut, schaut, was ist für Wunder dar; 8	Schaut hin! dort liegt im finstern Stall	Vom Himmel hoch, da komm ich her	Luther	1539	346	17 (II/8)
Gerhardt	1656	Wir singen dir, Immanuel; 2	Wir singen dir in deinem Heer	Vom Himmel hoch, da komm ich her	Luther	1539	346	23 (II/14)
Luther	1524	Gelobet seist du, Jesu Christ; 7	Dies hat er alles uns getan	Gelobet seist du, Jesu Christ	Luther	1524	1947	28 (III/5)
Gerhardt	1653	Fröhlich soll mein Herze springen; 15	Ich will dich mit Fleiß bewahren	Warum sollt ich mich denn grämen	Ebeling/Bach	1734	6462	33 (III/10)
Runge	1653	Laßt Furcht und Pein; 4	Seid froh, dieweil	Wir Christenleut habn jetzund Freud	Füger	1593	2072	35 (III/12)
Rist	1642	Jesu, du mein liebstes Leben; 1a	Jesu, du mein liebstes Leben	—	Bach	1734	—	38 (IV/3)
Rist	1642	Jesu, du mein liebstes Leben; 1b	Jesu, meine Freud und Wonne	—	Bach	1734	—	40 (IV/5)
Rist	1642	Hilf, Herr Jesu, laß gelingen; 15	Jesus richte mein Beginnen	Hilf, Herr Jesu, laß gelingen	Bach	1734	Vol. VI p. 566	42 (IV/7)
Weissel	1642	Nun, liebe Seel, nun ist es Zeit; 5	Dein Glanz all' Finsternis verzehrt	In dich hab ich gehoffet, Herr	(Nuremberg)	1581	2461c	46 (V/4)
Franck	1655	Ihr Gestirn, ihr hohlen Lüfte; 9	Zwar ist solche Herzensstube	Gott des Himmels und der Erden	Albert	1687	3614b	53 (V/11)
Gerhardt	1656	Ich steh an deiner Krippen hier; 1	Ich steh an deiner Krippen hier	Nun freut euch, lieben Christen g'mein	(Wittenberg)	1529	4429a	59 (VI/6)
Werner	1648	Ihr Christen auserkoren; 4	Nun seid ihr wohl gerochen	Herzlich tut mich verlangen	Hassler	1601	5385a	64 (VI/11)

==== Gospel narrative ====
Like for his other oratorios, and his Passion settings, Bach employed a narrative based on the Gospel in his Christmas Oratorio. The Gospel narrative of this oratorio followed, to a certain extent, the respective Gospel readings of the church services where the six cantatas of the Christmas Oratorio were to be performed for the first time. The six services of the Christmas season 1734–35 where the oratorio's cantatas were to be performed had these Gospel readings:

1. Christmas Day: Luke 2:1–14 (theme: Nativity, Annunciation to the shepherds and the angels' song).
2. Second Day of Christmas: Luke 2:15–20 (theme: Adoration of the Shepherds).
3. Third Day of Christmas: John 1:1–14 – prologue of the Gospel of John, also known as Hymn to the Word.
4. New Year's Day: Luke 2:21 (theme: Circumcision of Jesus)
5. Sunday after New Year: Matthew 2:13–23 (theme: the Flight into Egypt)
6. Epiphany: Matthew 2:1–12 (theme: Wise Men From the East)

As usual in most of his oratorios, and all of his Passions, the Evangelist character enunciated the Gospel text in sung recitatives, except the passages in direct speech, which were sung by soloists or choral groups representing the characters who spoke these texts according to the Gospel narrative. The Gospel text included by Bach in his six Christmas Oratorio cantatas consists of:

1. Luke 2:1, 3–7, i.e. part of the Christmas Day reading.
2. Luke 2:8–14, i.e. second half of the Christmas Day reading.
3. Luke 2:15–20, i.e. text of the Second Day of Christmas Gospel reading.
4. Luke 2:21, i.e. the New Year's Day Gospel reading
5. Matthew 2:1–6, i.e. part of the Gospel reading for the Epiphany feast
6. Matthew 2:7–12, i.e. second half of the Gospel reading for Epiphany

The Gospel readings for the Third Day of Christmas (Prologue of the Gospel of John), and for the Sunday after New Year (the Flight to Egypt) are not directly used in the Christmas Oratorio. In detail:

Gospel readings in Christmas Oratorio
Day	Reading	BWV 248	Occasion	Movement
Christmas 1	Luke 2:1	2 (I/2a)	Christmas 1	Es begab sich aber zu der Zeit
Christmas 1	Luke 2:2	—		
Christmas 1	Luke 2:3–6	2 (I/2b)	Christmas 1	Und jedermann ging
Christmas 1	Luke 2:7	6 (I/6)	Christmas 1	Und sie gebar ihren ersten Sohn
Christmas 1	Luke 2:8–9	11 (II/2)	Christmas 2	Und es waren Hirten in derselben Gegend
Christmas 1	Luke 2:10–11	13 (II/4)	Christmas 2	Und der Engel sprach zu ihnen
Christmas 1	Luke 2:12	16 (II/7)	Christmas 2	Und das habt zum Zeichen
Christmas 1	Luke 2:13	20 (II/11)	Christmas 2	Und alsobald war da bei dem Engel
Christmas 1	Luke 2:14	21 (II/12)	Christmas 2	Ehre sei Gott in der Höhe
Christmas 2	Luke 2:15a	25 (III/2)	Christmas 3	Und da die Engel von ihnen gen Himmel fuhren
Christmas 2	Luke 2:15b	26 (III/3)	Christmas 3	Lasset uns nun gehen gen Bethlehem
Christmas 2	Luke 2:16–19	30 (III/7)	Christmas 3	Und sie kamen eilend
Christmas 2	Luke 2:20	34 (III/11)	Christmas 3	Und die Hirten kehrten wieder um
Christmas 3	John 1:1–14	—		
New Year	Luke 2:21	37 (IV/2)	New Year	Und da acht Tage um waren
New Year I	Matthew 2:13–23	—		
Epiphany	Matthew 2:1	44 (V/2)	New Year I	Da Jesus geboren war zu Bethlehem
Epiphany	Matthew 2:2	45 (V/3)	New Year I	Wo ist der neugeborne König der Juden
Epiphany	Matthew 2:3	48 (V/6)	New Year I	Da das der König Herodes hörte
Epiphany	Matthew 2:4–6	50 (V/8)	New Year I	Und ließ versammeln alle Hohenpriester
Epiphany	Matthew 2:7–8	55 (VI/2)	Epiphany	Da berief Herodes die Weisen heimlich
Epiphany	Matthew 2:9–11	58 (VI/5)	Epiphany	Als sie nun den König gehöret hatten
Epiphany	Matthew 2:12	60 (VI/7)	Epiphany	Und Gott befahl ihnen im Traum

==== First performance ====
The oratorio was written for performance on six feast days of Christmas during the winter of 1734 and 1735. The original score also contains details of when each part was performed. It was incorporated within services of the two most important churches in Leipzig, St. Thomas and St. Nicholas. As can be seen below, the work was only performed in its entirety at the St. Nicholas Church.

First performances:

- 25 December 1734: Part I – 'early in the morning' at St. Nicholas; 'in the afternoon' at St. Thomas
- 26 December 1734: Part II – morning at St. Thomas; afternoon at St. Nicholas
- 27 December 1734: Part III – morning at St. Nicholas
- 1 January 1735: Part IV – morning at St. Thomas; afternoon at St. Nicholas
- 2 January 1735: Part V – morning at St Nicholas
- 6 January 1735: Part VI – morning at St. Thomas; afternoon at St. Nicholas

== Text ==
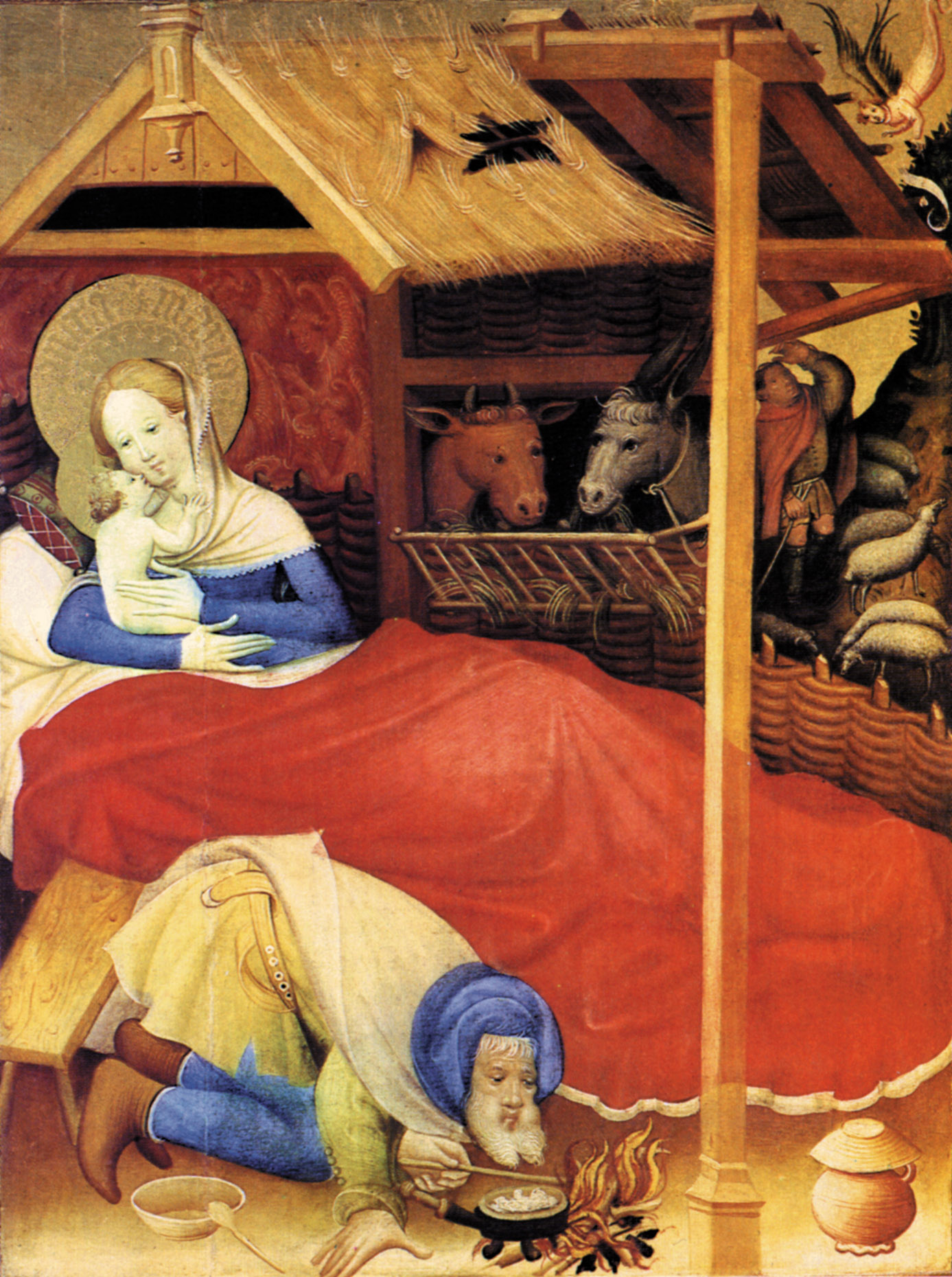
Conrad von Soest: Birth of Christ (1404)

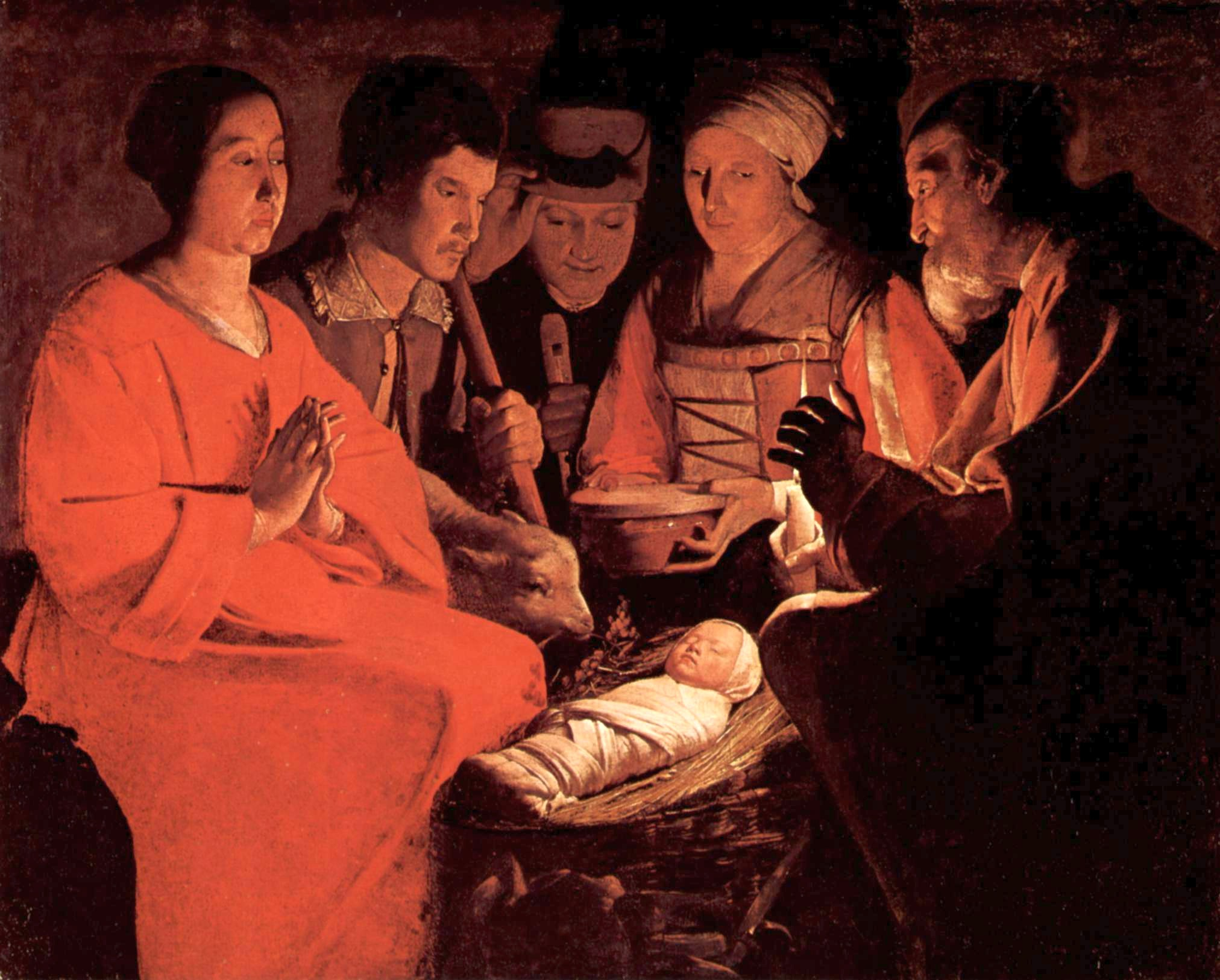
Georges de La Tour: Adoration of the Shepherds (1644)

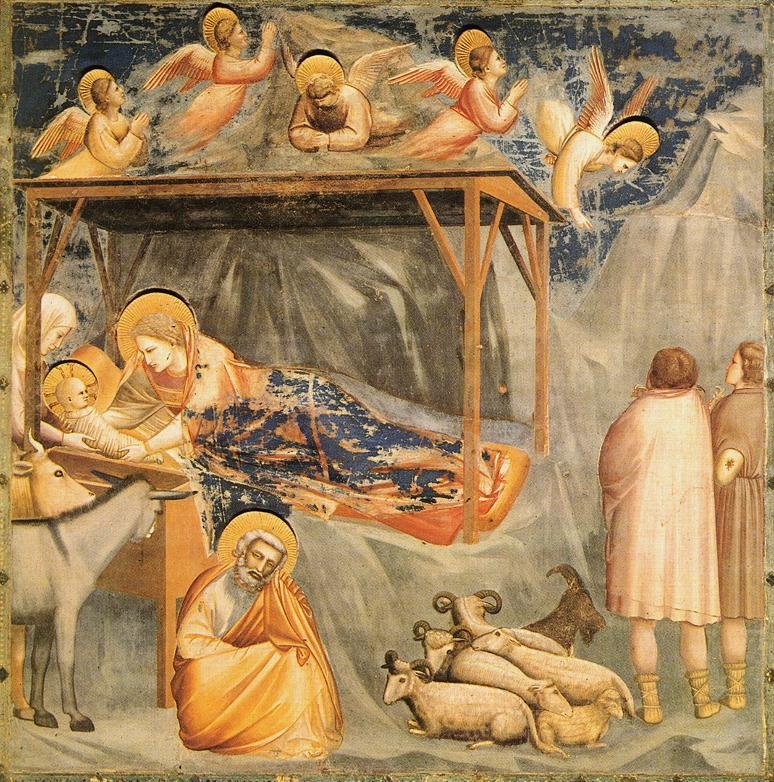
Giotto: Angels at the Nativity (c. 1300)

Rembrandt: Circumcision of Christ (1661)

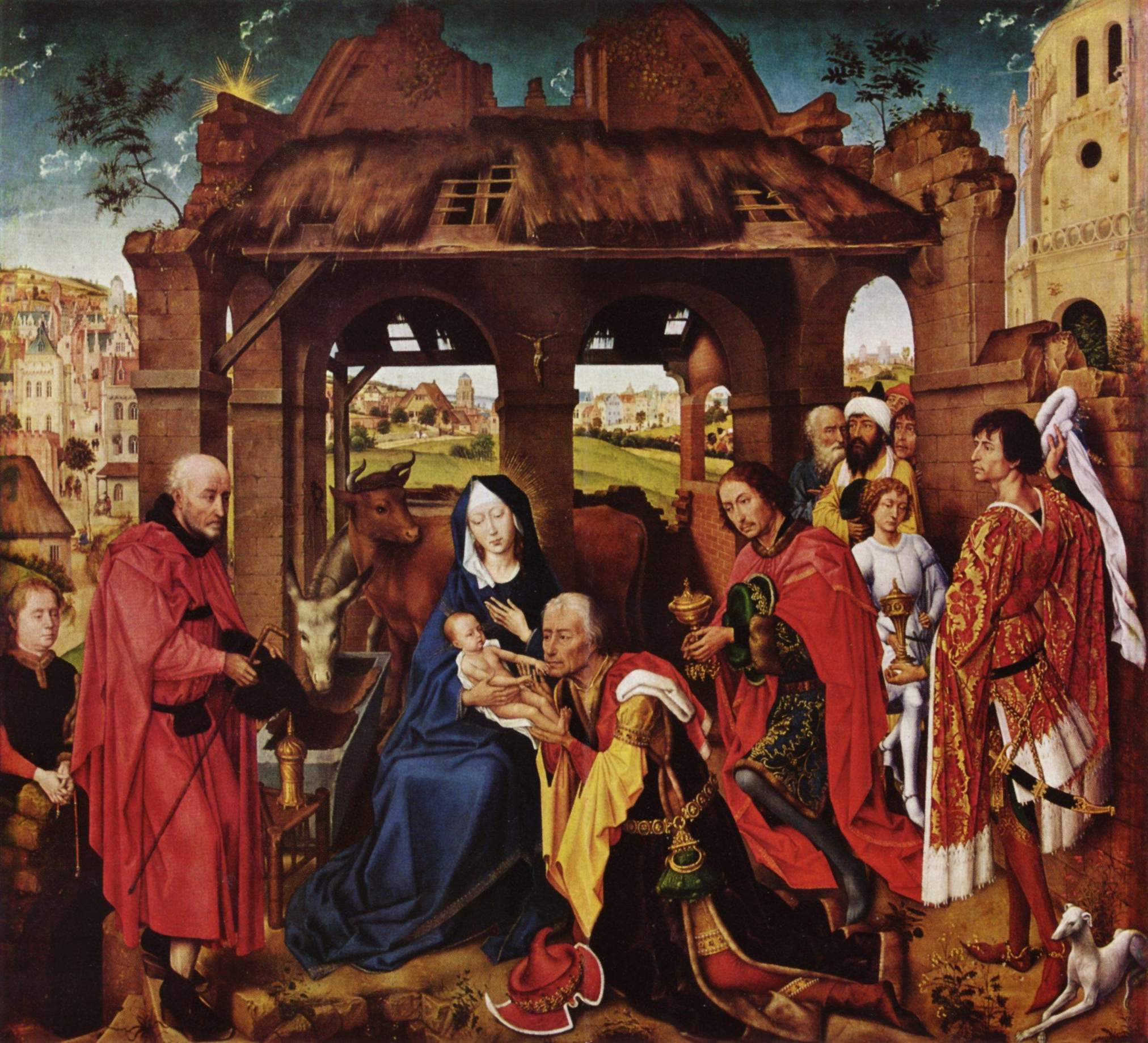
Rogier van der Weyden: Adoration of the Magi, from Saint Columba Altarpiece (c. 1430–1460)

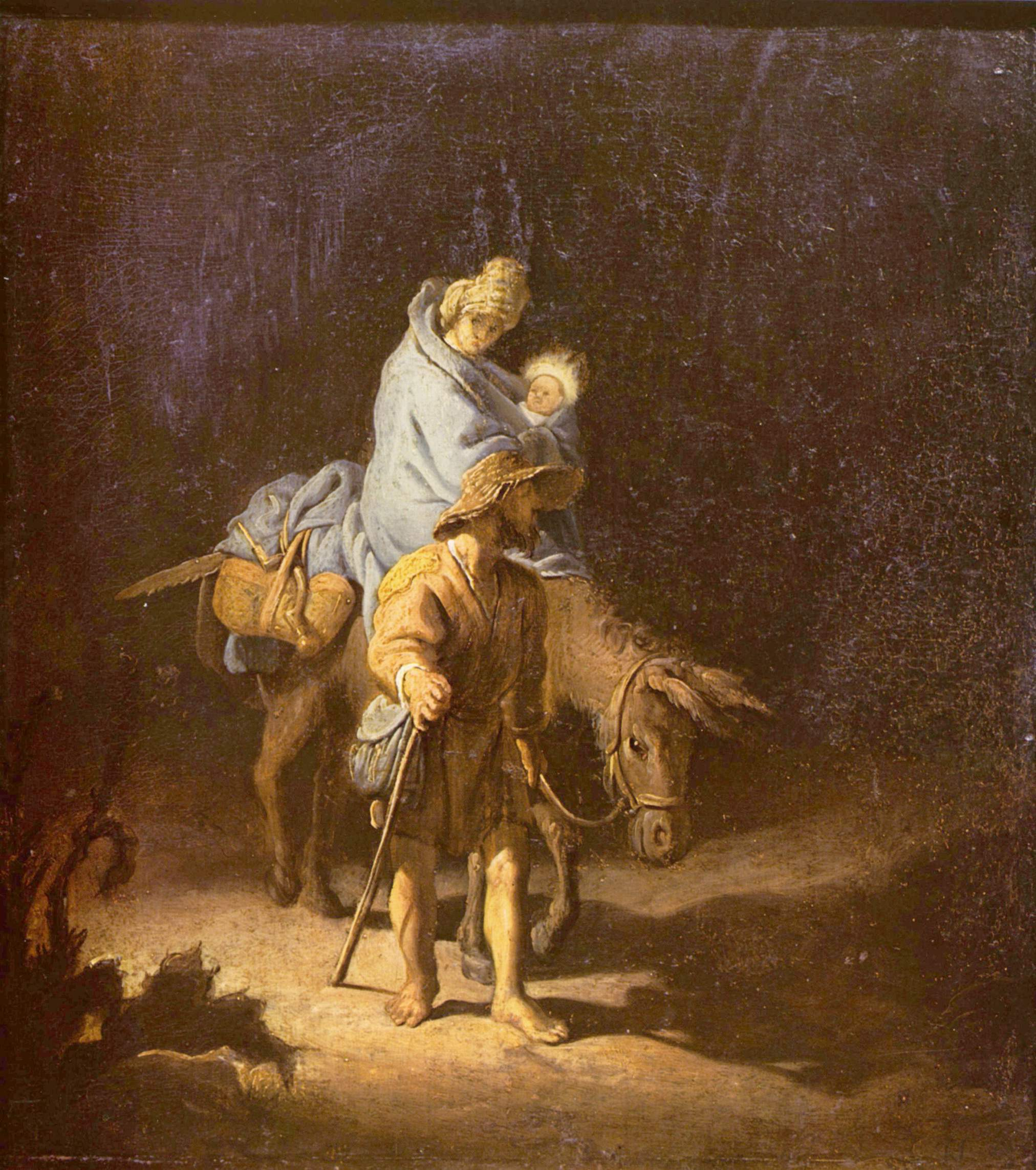
Rembrandt: Flight into Egypt (1627)

The ease with which the new text fits the existing music is one of the indications of how successful a parody the Christmas Oratorio is of its sources. Musicologist Alfred Dürr and others, such as Christoph Wolff have suggested that Bach's sometime collaborator Picander (the pen name of Christian Friedrich Henrici) wrote the new text, working closely with Bach to ensure a perfect fit with the re-used music. It may have even been the case that the Christmas Oratorio was already planned when Bach wrote the secular cantatas BWV 213, 214 and 215, given that the original works were written fairly close to the oratorio and the seamless way with which the new words fit the existing music.

Nevertheless, on two occasions Bach abandoned the original plan and was compelled to write new music for the Christmas Oratorio. The alto aria in Part III, "Schließe, mein Herze" was originally to have been set to the music for the aria "Durch die von Eifer entflammten Waffen" from BWV 215. On this occasion, however, the parody technique proved to be unsuccessful and Bach composed the aria afresh. Instead, he used the model from BWV 215 for the bass aria "Erleucht' auch meine finstre Sinnen" in Part V. Similarly, the opening chorus to Part V, "Ehre sei dir Gott!" was almost certainly intended to be set to the music of the chorus "Lust der Völker, Lust der Deinen" from BWV 213, given the close correspondence between the texts of the two pieces. The third major new piece of writing (with the notable exception of the recitatives), the sublime pastoral Sinfonia which opens Part II, was composed from scratch for the new work.

In addition to the new compositions listed above, special mention must go to the recitatives, which knit together the oratorio into a coherent whole. In particular, Bach made particularly effective use of recitative when combining it with chorales in no. 7 of part I ("Er ist auf Erden kommen arm") and even more ingeniously in the recitatives nos. 38 and 40 which frame the "Echo Aria" ("Flößt, mein Heiland"), no. 39 in part IV.

Until 1999 the only complete English version of the Christmas Oratorio was that prepared in 1874 by John Troutbeck for the music publisher Novello. A new edition has been worked up by Neil Jenkins.

=== Narrative structure ===
The structure of the story is defined to a large extent by the particular requirements of the church calendar for Christmas 1734/35. Bach abandoned his usual practice when writing church cantatas of basing the content upon the Gospel reading for that day in order to achieve a coherent narrative structure. Were he to have followed the calendar, the story would have unfolded as follows:

1. Birth and Annunciation to the Shepherds
2. The Adoration of the Shepherds
3. Prologue to the Gospel of John
4. Circumcision and Naming of Jesus
5. The Flight into Egypt
6. The Coming and Adoration of the Magi

This would have resulted in the Holy Family fleeing before the Magi had arrived, which was unsuitable for an oratorio evidently planned as a coherent whole. Bach removed the content for the Third Day of Christmas (27 December), John's Gospel, and split the story of the two groups of visitors—Shepherds and Magi—into two. This resulted in a more understandable exposition of the Christmas story:

1. The Birth
2. The Annunciation to the Shepherds
3. The Adoration of the Shepherds
4. The Circumcision and Naming of Jesus
5. The Journey of the Magi
6. The Adoration of the Magi

The Flight into Egypt takes place after the end of the sixth part.

That Bach saw the six parts as comprising a greater, unified whole is evident both from the surviving printed text and from the structure of the music itself. The edition has not only a title—Weihnachts-Oratorium—connecting together the six sections, but these sections are also numbered consecutively. As John Butt has mentioned, this points, as in the Mass in B minor, to a unity beyond the performance constraints of the church year.

== Music ==
Bach expresses the unity of the whole work within the music itself, in part through his use of key signatures. Parts I and III are written in the keys of D major, part II in its subdominant key G major. Parts I and III are similarly scored for exuberant trumpets, while the Pastoral Part II (referring to the Shepherds) is, by contrast, scored for woodwind instruments and does not include an opening chorus. Part IV is written in F major (the relative key to D minor) and marks the furthest musical point away from the oratorio's opening key, scored for horns. Bach then embarks upon a journey back to the opening key, via the dominant A major of Part V to the jubilant re-assertion of D major in the final part, lending an overall arc to the piece. To reinforce this connection, between the beginning and the end of the work, Bach re-uses the chorale melody of Part I's "Wie soll ich dich empfangen" in the final chorus of Part VI, "Nun seid ihr wohl gerochen"; this choral melody is the same as of "O Haupt voll Blut und Wunden", which Bach used five times in his St Matthew Passion.

The music represents a particularly sophisticated expression of the parody technique, by which existing music is adapted to a new purpose. Bach took the majority of the choruses and arias from works which had been written some time earlier. Most of this music was 'secular', that is written in praise of royalty or notable local figures, outside the tradition of performance within the church.

=== Instrumentation ===
The scoring below refers to parts, rather than necessarily to individual players. Adherents of theories specifying small numbers of performers (even to 'One Voice Per Part') may however choose to use numbers approaching one instrument per named part.

Part I
3 trumpets, timpani, 2 transverse flutes, 2 oboes (both of which double on oboe d'amore) 2 violins, viola, continuo group (Note: The continuo part is open to interpretation in matters of scoring. Examples: for his 1973 recording, Nikolaus Harnoncourt employed bassoon, violoncello, violone (double bass) and organ; Peter Schreier (1987) used violoncello, double bass, bassoon, organ and harpsichord; René Jacobs in 1997 chose violoncello, double bass, lute, bassoon, organ and harpsichord; and Jos van Veldhoven in 2003 opted for violoncello, double bass, bassoon, organ, harpsichord and theorbo.) (Note: The different types of oboes referred to above are mostly called for at different points in each section. However, numbers 10, 12, 14, 17, 18, 19 and 21 in Part II call for 2 oboe d'amore and 2 oboe da caccia. This scoring was intended to symbolise the shepherds who are the subject of the second part. It is a reference to the pastoral music tradition of shepherds playing shawm-like instruments at Christmas. Similarly, the pastoral sinfony in Handel's Messiah (1741) is known as the 'Pifa' after the Italian piffero or piffaro, similar to the shawm and an ancestor of the oboe.)
Part II
2 flutes, 2 oboes d'amore, 2 oboes da caccia, 2 violins, viola, continuo
Part III
3 trumpets, timpani, 2 flutes, 2 oboes (both of which double on oboe d'amore), 2 violins, viola, continuo
Part IV
2 horns, 2 oboes, 2 violins, viola, continuo
Part V
2 oboes d'amore, 2 violins, viola, continuo
Part VI
3 trumpets, timpani, 2 oboes (both of which double on oboe d'amore), 2 violins, viola, continuo

== Parts and numbers ==
Each section combines choruses (a pastoral Sinfonia opens Part II instead of a chorus), chorales and from the soloists recitatives, ariosos and arias.

By notational convention the recitatives are in common time.

=== Part I ===
Part I: For the First Day of Christmas
No.		Key	Time	First line	Scoring	Source and Audio
1	Chorus	D major	3/8	Jauchzet, frohlocket, auf, preiset die Tage	3 trumpets, timpani, 2 flutes, 2 oboes, strings (violin I, II, viola) and continuo (cello, violone, organ and bassoon)	BWV 214: Chorus, Tönet, ihr Pauken! 01 Jauchzet, frohlocket
2	Recitative (Evangelist, tenor)			Es begab sich aber zu der Zeit	Continuo	Luke 2:1-6 02 Es begab sich aber
3	Recitative (alto)			Nun wird mein liebster Bräutigam	2 oboe d'amore, continuo	03 Nun wird mein liebster
4	Aria (alto)	A min	3/8	Bereite dich, Zion, mit zärtlichen Trieben	Oboe d'amore I, violin I, continuo	BWV 213: Aria, Ich will dich nicht hören 04 Bereite dich, Zion
5	Chorale	E-Phrygian	common time	Wie soll ich dich empfangen	2 flutes, 2 oboes, strings and continuo	"Wie soll ich dich empfangen", v. 1 (Paul Gerhardt, 1653); Zahn 5385a (Hans Leo Hassler, 1601) 05 Wie soll ich dich
6	Recitative (Evangelist, tenor)			Und sie gebar ihren ersten Sohn	Continuo	Luke 2:7 06 Und sie gebar ihren
7	Chorale (sopranos) Recitative (bass)	G major	3/4	Er ist auf Erden kommen arm Wer will die Liebe recht erhöhn	2 oboe d'amore, continuo	"Gelobet seist du, Jesu Christ", v. 6 (Martin Luther, 1524); Zahn 1947 (Wittenberg 1524) 07 Er ist auf Erden
8	Aria (bass)	D major	2/4	Großer Herr, o starker König	Trumpet I, flute I, strings, continuo	BWV 214: Aria, Kron und Preis gekrönter Damen 08 Großer Herr
9	Chorale	D major	common time	Ach mein herzliebes Jesulein!	3 trumpets, timpani, 2 flutes, 2 oboes, strings and continuo (cello, violone, organ and bassoon)	"Vom Himmel hoch, da komm ich her", v. 13 (Martin Luther, 1535); Zahn 346 (Martin Luther, 1539) 09 Ach mein herzliebes

=== Part II ===
Part II: For the Second Day of Christmas
No.		Key	Time	First line	Scoring	Source and audio
10	Sinfonia	G major	12/8	—	2 flutes, 2 oboe d'amore, 2 oboe da caccia, strings, continuo	10 Sinfonia
11	Recitative (Evangelist, tenor)			Und es waren Hirten in derselben Gegend	Continuo	Luke 2:8-9 11 Und es waren Hirten
12	Chorale	G major	common time	Brich an, o schönes Morgenlicht	2 flutes, 2 oboe d'amore, 2 oboe da caccia, strings, continuo	"Ermuntre dich, mein schwacher Geist", v. 9 (Johann Rist, 1641); Zahn 5741 (Johann Schop, 1641) 12 Brich an, o schönes
13	Recitative (Evangelist, tenor; Angel, soprano)			Und der Engel sprach zu ihnen Fürchtet euch nicht	Strings, continuo	Luke 2:10-11 13 Und der Engel sprach
14	Recitative (bass)			Was Gott dem Abraham verheißen	2 oboe d'amore, 2 oboe da caccia, strings, continuo	14 Was Gott dem Abraham
15	Aria (tenor)	E minor	3/8	Frohe Hirten, eilt, ach eilet	Flute I, continuo	BWV 214/5: Aria, "Fromme Musen! meine Glieder" 15 Frohe Hirten
16	Recitative (Evangelist, tenor) (Note: In some performances sung by the Angel (soprano).)			Und das habt zum Zeichen	Continuo	Luke 2:12 16 Und das habt zum Zeichen
17	Chorale	C major	common time	Schaut hin! dort liegt im finstern Stall	2 flutes, 2 oboe d'amore, 2 oboe da caccia, strings, continuo	"Schaut, schaut, was ist für Wunder dar", v. 8 (Paul Gerhardt, 1667); Zahn 346 (Martin Luther, 1539) 17 Schaut hin
18	Recitative (bass)			So geht denn hin!	2 oboe d'amore, 2 oboe da caccia, continuo	18 So geht denn hin
19	Aria (alto)	G maj/E min	2/4	Schlafe, mein Liebster, genieße der Ruh'	Flute I (colla parte an octave above the alto soloist throughout), 2 oboe d'amore, 2 oboe da caccia, strings, continuo	BWV 213/3: Aria, "Schlafe, mein Liebster, und pflege der Ruh" 19 Schlafe, mein Liebster
20	Recitative (Evangelist, tenor)			Und alsobald war da bei dem Engel	Continuo	Luke 2:13 20 Und alsobald war da
21	Chorus	G major	2/2	Ehre sei Gott in der Höhe	2 flutes, 2 oboe d'amore, 2 oboe da caccia, strings, continuo	Luke 2:14 21 Ehre sei Gott
22	Recitative (bass)			So recht, ihr Engel, jauchzt und singet	Continuo	22 So recht, ihr Engel
23	Chorale	G major	12/8	Wir singen dir in deinem Heer	2 flutes, 2 oboe d'amore, 2 oboe da caccia, strings, continuo	"Wir singen dir, Immanuel", v. 2 (Paul Gerhardt, 1656); Zahn 346 (Martin Luther, 1539) 23 Wir singen dir

=== Part III ===
Part III: For the Third Day of Christmas
No.		Key	Time	First line	Scoring	Source and Audio
24	Chorus	D major	3/8	Herrscher des Himmels, erhöre das Lallen	Trumpet I, II, III, timpani, flute I, II, oboe I, II, strings, continuo	BWV 214: Chorus, Blühet, ihr Linden in Sachsen, wie Zedern 24 Herrscher des Himmels
25	Recitative (Evangelist, tenor)			Und da die Engel von ihnen gen Himmel fuhren	Continuo	Luke 2:15 25 Und da die Engel
26	Chorus	A major	3/4	Lasset uns nun gehen gen Bethlehem	Flute I, II, oboe d'amore I, II, strings, continuo	26 Lasset uns nun gehen
27	Recitative (bass)			Er hat sein Volk getröst't	Flute I, II, continuo	27 Er hat sein Volk
28	Chorale	D major	common time	Dies hat er alles uns getan	Flute I, II, oboe I, II, strings, continuo	"Gelobet seist du, Jesu Christ", v. 7 (Martin Luther, 1524); Zahn 1947 (Wittenberg 1524) 28 Dies hat er alles
29	Duet (soprano, bass)	A major	3/8	Herr, dein Mitleid, dein Erbarmen	Oboe d'amore I, II, continuo	BWV 213: Aria, Ich bin deine, du bist meine 29 Herr, dein Mitleid
30	Recitative (Evangelist, tenor)			Und sie kamen eilend	Continuo	Luke 2:16-19 30 Und sie kamen eilend
31	Aria (alto)	D maj/B min	2/4	Schließe, mein Herze, dies selige Wunder	Violin solo, continuo	31 Schliesse mein Herze
32	Recitative (alto)			Ja, ja! mein Herz soll es bewahren	Flute I, II, continuo	32 Ja, ja, mein Herz
33	Chorale	G major	common time	Ich will dich mit Fleiß bewahren	Flute I, II, oboe I, II, strings, continuo	"Fröhlich soll mein Herze springen", v. 15 (Paul Gerhardt, 1653); Zahn 6461 (Johann Georg Ebeling, 1666) 33 Ich will dich mit
34	Recitative (Evangelist, tenor)			Und die Hirten kehrten wieder um	Continuo	Luke 2:20 34 Und die Hirten
35	Chorale	F♯ minor	common time	Seid froh, dieweil	Flute I, II, oboe I, II, strings, continuo	"Laßt Furcht und Pein", v. 4 (Christoph Runge, 1653); Zahn 2072 (Kaspar Füger, 1593) 35 Seid froh, dieweil
24	Chorus da capo	D major	3/8	Herrscher des Himmels, erhöre das Lallen	Trumpet I, II, III, timpani, flute I, II, oboe I, II, strings, continuo	BWV 214: Chorus, Blühet, ihr Linden in Sachsen, wie Zedern 36 Herrscher des Himmels

=== Part IV ===
Part IV: For New Year's Day (Feast of the Circumcision)
No.		Key	Time	First line	Scoring	Source
36	Chorus	F major	3/8	Fallt mit Danken, fallt mit Loben	Horns I, II, oboe I, II, strings, continuo	BWV 213: Chorus, Lasst uns sorgen, lasst uns wachen
37	Recitative (Evangelist, tenor)			Und da acht Tage um waren	Continuo	Luke 2:21
38	Recitative (bass); Arioso (sopr./bass)			Immanuel, o süßes Wort; Jesu, du mein liebstes Leben	Strings, continuo	
39	Aria (soprano & 'Echo' soprano)	C major	6/8	Flößt, mein Heiland, flößt dein Namen	Oboe I solo, continuo	BWV 213: Aria, Treues Echo dieser Orten
40	Recitative (bass); Arioso (soprano)			Wohlan! dein Name soll allein Jesu, meine Freud' und Wonne	Strings, continuo	
41	Aria (tenor)	D minor	common time	Ich will nur dir zu Ehren leben	Violin I, II, continuo	BWV 213: Aria, Auf meinen Flügeln sollst du schweben
42	Chorale	F major	3/4	Jesus richte mein Beginnen	Horns I, II, oboe I, II, strings, continuo	Words: Johann Rist, 1642

=== Part V ===
Part V: For the First Sunday in the New Year (Note: Part V is meant to be performed on the Sunday between New Year's Day and Epiphany on 6 January; in years that start on Sunday or Monday or Tuesday (with the Dominical letters A/AG, G/GF, F/FE), there is no such day, e.g in 2017, 2018, 2019, 2023, 2024 & 2029.)
No.		Key	Time	First line	Scoring	Source
43	Chorus	A maj/F♯ min	3/4	Ehre sei dir, Gott, gesungen	Oboe d'amore I, II, strings, continuo	
44	Recitative (Evangelist, tenor)			Da Jesus geboren war zu Bethlehem	Continuo	Matthew 2:1
45	Chorus; Recitative (alto); Chorus	D major	common time	Wo ist der neugeborne König der Juden (Note: Matthew 2:2); Sucht ihn in meiner Brust; Wir haben seinen Stern gesehen	Oboe d'amore I, II, strings, continuo	BWV 247: St Mark Passion, Chorus, Pfui dich, wie fein zerbrichst du den Tempel
46	Chorale	A major	common time	Dein Glanz all' Finsternis verzehrt	Oboe d'amore I, II, strings, continuo	Words: Georg Weissel, 1642
47	Aria (bass)	F♯ minor	2/4	Erleucht' auch meine finstre Sinnen	Oboe d'amore I solo, organ (continuo tacet)	BWV 215: Aria, Durch die von Eifer entflammeten Waffen
48	Recitative (Evangelist, tenor)			Da das der König Herodes hörte	Continuo	Matthew 2:3
49	Recitative (alto)			Warum wollt ihr erschrecken	Strings, continuo	
50	Recitative (Evangelist, tenor)			Und ließ versammeln alle Hohenpriester	Continuo	Matthew 2:4-6
51	Trio (sopr., alto, ten.)	B minor	2/4	Ach! wann wird die Zeit erscheinen?	Violin I solo, continuo	unknown
52	Recitative (alto)			Mein Liebster herrschet schon	Continuo	
53	Chorale	A major	common time	Zwar ist solche Herzensstube	Oboe d'amore I, II, strings, continuo	Words: Johann Franck, 1655

=== Part VI ===
Part VI: For the Feast of Epiphany
No.		Key	Time	First line	Scoring	Source
54	Chorus	D major	3/8	Herr, wenn die stolzen Feinde schnauben	Trumpet I, II, III, timpani, oboe I, II, strings, continuo	BWV 248a (lost church cantata)
55	Recitative (Evangelist, tenor; Herod, bass)			Da berief Herodes die Weisen heimlich Ziehet hin und forschet fleißig	Continuo	Matthew 2:7-8
56	Recitative (soprano)			Du Falscher, suche nur den Herrn zu fällen	Strings, continuo	BWV 248a (lost church cantata)
57	Aria (soprano)	A maj/F♯ min/A maj	3/4	Nur ein Wink von seinen Händen	Oboe d'amore I, strings, continuo	BWV 248a (lost church cantata)
58	Recitative (Evangelist, tenor)			Als sie nun den König gehöret hatten	Continuo	Matthew 2:9-11
59	Chorale	G major	common time	Ich steh an deiner Krippen hier	Oboe I, II, strings, continuo	Words: Paul Gerhardt, 1656
60	Recitative (Evangelist, tenor)			Und Gott befahl ihnen im Traum'	Continuo	Matthew 2:12
61	Recitative (tenor)			So geht! Genug, mein Schatz geht nicht von hier	Oboe d'amore I, II, continuo	BWV 248a (lost church cantata)
62	Aria (tenor)	B minor	2/4	Nun mögt ihr stolzen Feinde schrecken	Oboe d'amore I, II, continuo	BWV 248a (lost church cantata)
63	Recitative (soprano, alto, tenor, bass)			Was will der Höllen Schrecken nun	Continuo	BWV 248a (lost church cantata)
64	Chorale	D major	common time	Nun seid ihr wohl gerochen	Trumpet I, II, III, timpani, oboe I, II, strings, continuo	BWV 248a (lost church cantata); Words: Georg Werner, 1648

== Reception ==
In Göran Tunström's 1983 Swedish novel Juloratoriet (The Christmas Oratorio) and its 1996 film version, Bach's work is important for the leading characters.

The first English-language monograph on the Christmas Oratorio was published in 2004. It was a translation of a 2002 Dutch-language study by Ignace Bossuyt.

The 2024 German-Austrian TV film Bach – Ein Weihnachtswunder [Bach – A Christmas Miracle] tells a fictional story about the creation of the Christmas Oratorio in the context of local politics and domestic conflicts in the Bach family.

== Cited sources ==
- Bossuyt, Ignace [in French] (2004). Johann Sebastian Bach, Christmas Oratorio (BWV 248). Translated by Bull, Stratton. Foreword by Philippe Herreweghe. Leuven: Leuven University Press. ISBN 978-90-5867-421-0.
- Butt, John (1 November 2006). "Johann Sebastian Bach: Christmas Oratorio (BWV 248). By Ignace Bossuyt. Trans. by Stratton Bull. pp. 185". Music & Letters. 87 (4). Oxford University Press: 654–656. doi:10.1093/ml/gcl037. JSTOR 4140326.
- Dürr, Alfred; Kobayashi, Yoshitake, eds. (1998). Bach Werke Verzeichnis: Kleine Ausgabe – Nach der von Wolfgang Schmieder vorgelegten 2. Ausgabe [Bach Works Catalogue: Small Edition – After Wolfgang Schmieder's 2nd edition] (in German). Kirsten Beißwenger (collaborator). (BWV^{2a} ed.). Wiesbaden: Breitkopf & Härtel. ISBN 978-3-7651-0249-3. Preface in English and German.
- Dürr, Alfred; Jones, Richard D. P. (2006). The Cantatas of J. S. Bach: With Their Librettos in German-English Parallel Text. Oxford University Press. pp. 102–105, 820. ISBN 978-0-19-929776-4.
- Glöckner, Andreas (2009). "Ein weiterer Kantatenjahrgang Gottfried Heinrich Stölzels in Bachs Aufführungsrepertoire?" [Is there another cantata cycle by Gottfried Heinrich Stölzel that belonged to Bach's performance repertoire?]. In Wollny, Peter (ed.). Bach-Jahrbuch 2009 [Bach Yearbook 2009]. Bach-Jahrbuch (in German). Vol. 95. Neue Bachgesellschaft. Leipzig: Evangelische Verlagsanstalt. pp. 95–115. doi:10.13141/bjb.v2009. ISBN 978-3-374-02749-1. ISSN 0084-7682.
- Hofmann, Klaus (2005). "Foreword". Johann Sebastian Bach: Weihnachtsoratorium – Christmas Oratorio – Oratorium Tempore Nativitatis Christi – BWV 248 (PDF) (Urtext edition: vocal score). Henry S. Drinker (English lyrics), Paul Horn (piano reduction), John Coombs (Foreword translator). Carus-Verlag. p. V. 31.248/53.
- Melamed, Daniel R. (1995). J. S. Bach and the German Motet. Cambridge University Press. ISBN 978-0-521-41864-5.
- Rathey, Markus (2016). Johann Sebastian Bach's Christmas Oratorio: Music, Theology, Culture. Oxford University Press. ISBN 978-0-19-027525-9.
- Rathey, Markus (2016b). Bach's Major Vocal Works. Music, Drama, Liturgy. Yale University Press. ISBN 9780300219517.
- Terry, Charles Sanford (1915). "The Christmas Oratorio (1734)". The Hymns and Hymn Melodies of the "Passions" and Oratorios. Bach's Chorals. Vol. I. Cambridge: University Press. pp. 41–61.
- Wessel, Jens (2015). "Köthen (1717–1723)". J. S. Bach und die italienische Oper / Drammi per musica für das kurfürstlich-sächsische und polnische Königshaus zwischen 1733 und 1736 (PDF) (dissertation) (in German). Hochschule für Musik und Theater Hamburg. pp. 25–44, 47, 99–100.
- Zahn, Johannes (1891). Die Melodien von den achtzeiligen trochäischen bis zu den zehnzeiligen inkl. enthaltend [Melodies in eight trochaic up to and including ten lines]. Die Melodien der deutschen evangelischen Kirchenlieder (in German). Vol. IV. Gütersloh: Bertelsmann.
- Zahn, Johannes (1893). Schlüßband: Chronologisches Verzeichnis der benutzten Gesang-, Melodien- und Choralbücher, und die letzten Nachträge [Closing volume: chronological catalogue of used song-, melody- and choirbooks, and the last supplements]. Die Melodien der deutschen evangelischen Kirchenlieder (in German). Vol. VI. Gütersloh: Bertelsmann.
