= Jauchzet, frohlocket! Auf, preiset die Tage, BWV 248 I =

Cantata by Johann Sebastian Bach

Jauchzet, frohlocket! Auf, preiset die Tage
- Part I of Christmas Oratorio
- Christmas cantata by J. S. Bach
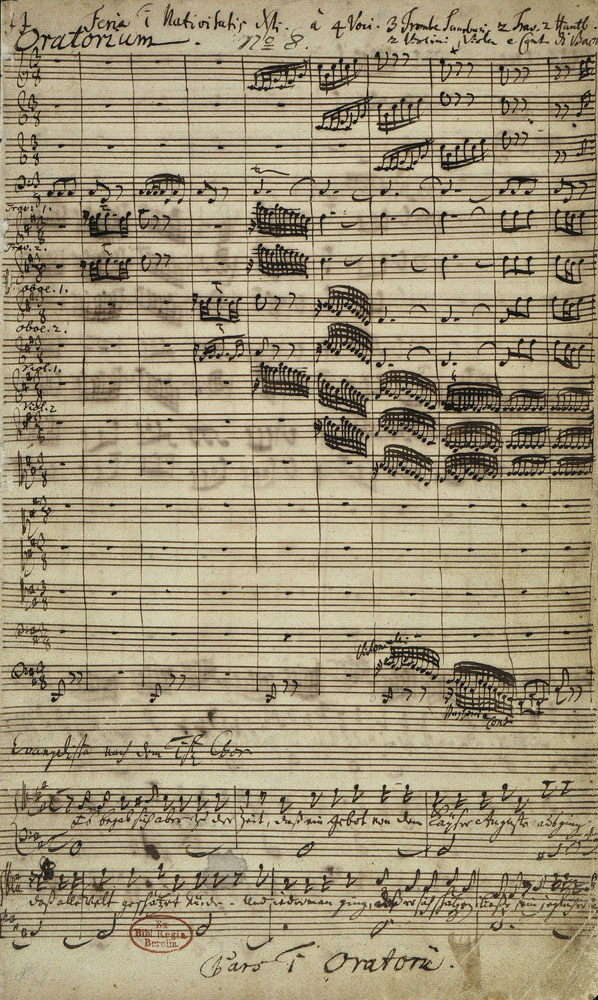
- First page of the manuscript of the score
- Catalogue: BWV 248 I
- Related: BWV 214; BWV 213
- Text: Luke 2:1, 3–7; "Wie soll ich dich empfangen"; "Gelobet seist du, Jesu Christ"; "Vom Himmel hoch, da komm ich her"
- Performed: 25 December 1734: Leipzig
- Movements: 9
- Vocal: SATB choir and soloists
- Instrumental: 3 trumpets; timpani; 2 traversos; 2 oboes; 2 oboes d'amore; 2 violins; viola; cello; violone; continuo

Jauchzet, frohlocket! Auf, preiset die Tage (Shout for joy, exult, rise up, praise the day), BWV 248^{I} (also written as BWV 248 I), is a 1734 Christmas cantata by Johann Sebastian Bach that serves as the first part of his Christmas Oratorio. Bach was then Thomaskantor, responsible for church music at four churches in Leipzig, a position he had assumed in 1723. For the oratorio, the libretto by an unknown author followed the Nativity of Jesus from the Gospel of Luke, interspersed with reflective texts for recitatives and arias, and stanzas from Lutheran hymns.

The cantata is structured in nine movements. An extended choral introduction is followed by two scenes, each a sequence of four movements. Both scenes are composed of a quotation from the Gospel of Luke, a recitative reflecting the narration, an aria-like prayer or meditation, and a chorale setting a stanza from a Lutheran hymn. Bach scored the cantata for three vocal soloists, a four-part choir and a festive Baroque orchestra with trumpets, timpani, flutes, oboes and strings. A tenor soloist narrates the Biblical story in secco recitative, as the Evangelist. There are two chorales: a four-part setting of Paul Gerhardt's "Wie soll ich dich empfangen" and a closing score with an independent orchestra set to text for a stanza from Martin Luther's "Vom Himmel hoch, da komm ich her".

The opening movement and the two arias rely on secular cantatas composed for members of the Dresden court. The opening and one aria are based on Tönet, ihr Pauken! Erschallet, Trompeten! (Resound, ye drums! Ring out, ye trumpets!), BWV 214, which he had composed for the birthday of Maria Josepha of Saxony on 8 December 1733. The other aria is based on Laßt uns sorgen, laßt uns wachen, BWV 213, written for the 11th birthday of Crown Prince Friedrich Christian the same year.

Bach led the first performances with the Thomanerchor at the two main churches of Leipzig on 25 December 1734 during morning and vespers services.

== Background ==
Since his appointment as director musices in Leipzig in 1723, Bach had been presenting church cantatas for the Christmas season in the Thomaskirche (St. Thomas Church) and Nikolaikirche (St. Nicholas Church), including the following Christmas Day cantatas:

- 1723: Christen, ätzet diesen Tag, BWV 63, originally composed in 1714 as part of Bach's Weimar cantata cycle and adopted in his first cantata cycle after its presentation in Leipzig during the 1723–24 Christmas season;
- 1724: Gelobet seist du, Jesu Christ, BWV 91 (early version), part of the chorale cantata cycle;
- 1725: Unser Mund sei voll Lachens, BWV 110, part of Bach's third cantata cycle;
- 1728 (or 1729): Ehre sei Gott in der Höhe, BWV 197a, a partly lost cantata of the Picander cycle of 1728–29.

Church music in Latin was not uncommon for Christmas Day in Leipzig: Bach's compositions of this genre include, for Christmas Day of 1723, the Christmas version of his Magnificat, BWV 243a, and the Sanctus in D major, BWV 238. Another Sanctus, the Sanctus for six vocal parts, BWV 232 III (early version), was composed for Christmas Day of 1724.

=== Dresden court ===
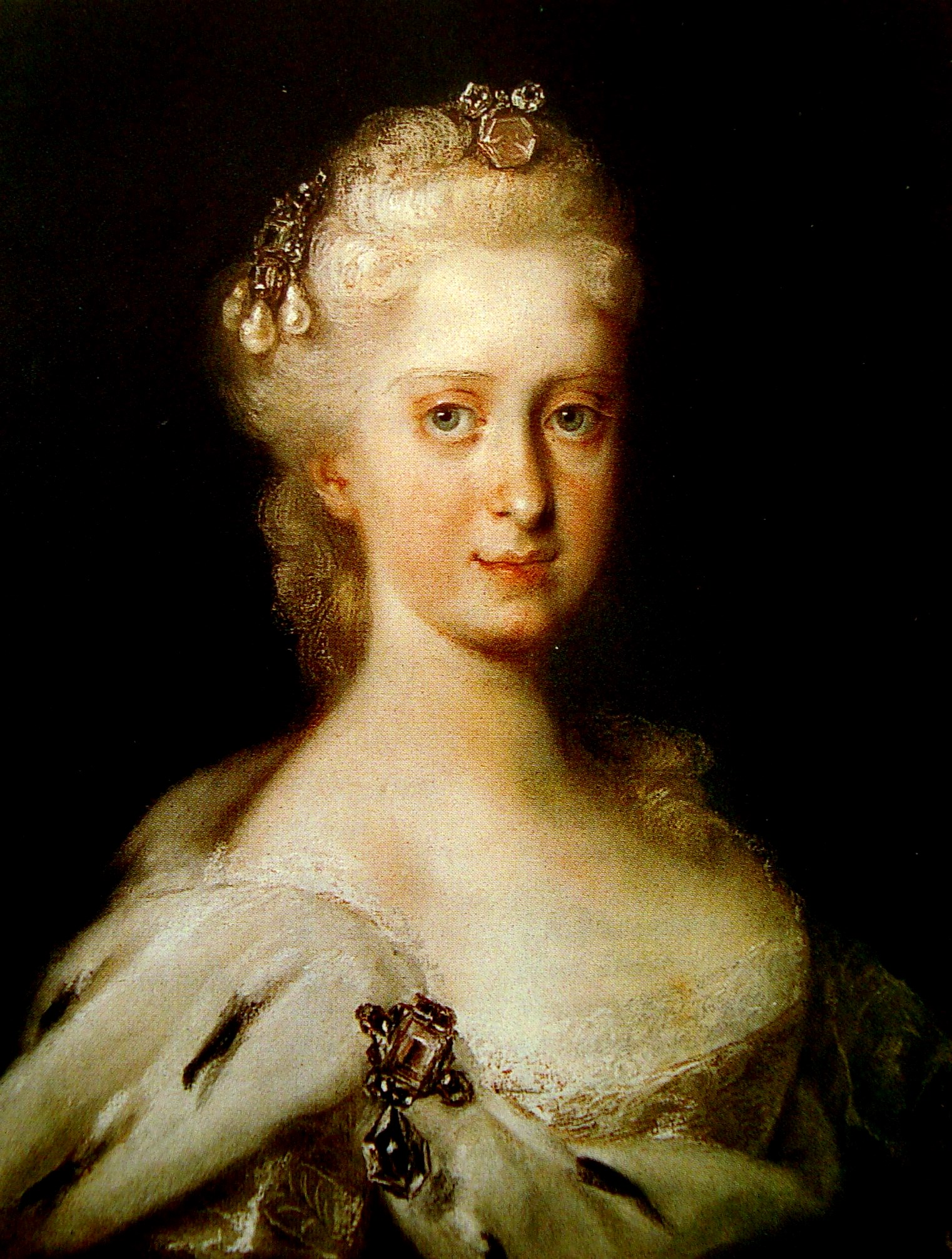
Maria Josepha, the dedicatee of BWV 214, in a 1720 painting by Rosalba Carriera

In 1733, Augustus III of Poland, the Elector of Saxony succeeded his father, Augustus the Strong, as Elector of Saxony and took residence in Dresden. Bach hoped to become court composer, and dedicated the Missa of 1733 to Augustus.

One of Bach's secular cantatas, Laßt uns sorgen, laßt uns wachen, BWV 213, also known as Hercules am Scheidewege (Hercules at the Crossroads), on a libretto by Picander, was performed on 5 September 1733, the 11th birthday of the son of the elector. He wrote a further cantata for the elector's wife, Maria Josepha, to honour her 34th birthday on 8 December: Tönet, ihr Pauken! Erschallet, Trompeten! BWV 214 (Resound, ye drums! Ring out, ye trumpets!). It is also known as "Glückwunschkantate zum Geburtstage der Königin" (Congratulation cantata for the Queen's birthday), although Maria Josepha was not crowned Queen of Poland until January 1734.

Three extended movements of BWV 248 I are based on music from these two cantatas: the opening chorus follows the opening of Tönet, ihr Pauken!, and the alto and bass arias are derived from Laßt uns sorgen and Tönet, ihr Pauken!, respectively.

=== Readings and text ===
Bach composed Jauchzet, frohlocket! in 1734. The cantata forms Part I of his Christmas Oratorio, which was performed on six occasions during Christmas time, beginning with Part I on Christmas Day. The prescribed readings for the feast day were one from the Epistle to Titus, "God's mercy appeared" (Titus 2:11–14), or Isaiah, "Unto us a child is born" (Isaiah 9:2–7), and a second from the Gospel of Luke describing the nativity, annunciation to the shepherds and angels' song (Luke 2:1–14). The identity of the librettist is unknown; he may have been Picander, an earlier collaborator. After the opening chorus, the story is told following the Gospel of Luke, interspersed with reflecting recitatives, arias and chorales. Part I describes the nativity of Jesus until the child is born.

The work is structured in nine movements. The text of the opening chorus is a free paraphrase of the beginning of Psalm 100. The chorus is followed by two groups of four movements each, following the pattern: reading / recitative / aria / chorale. Alfred Dürr notes that the theologian August Hermann Francke and others had recommended three steps when reading the Bible: reading / meditation / prayer, and sees a similar approach, with the chorale comparing to the amen confirming the prayer.

The tenor soloist narrates from Martin Luther's translation of the Bible in recitative as the Evangelist (Luke 2:1, 3–7). The choir sings two chorales, a four-part setting of Paul Gerhardt's "Wie soll ich dich empfangen" and a setting for choir and independent orchestra of the 13th stanza from Martin Luther's "Vom Himmel hoch, da komm ich her", to close the cantata. In the seventh movement, a recitative is combined with the sixth stanza of Luther's hymn "Gelobet seist du, Jesu Christ".

=== First performance ===
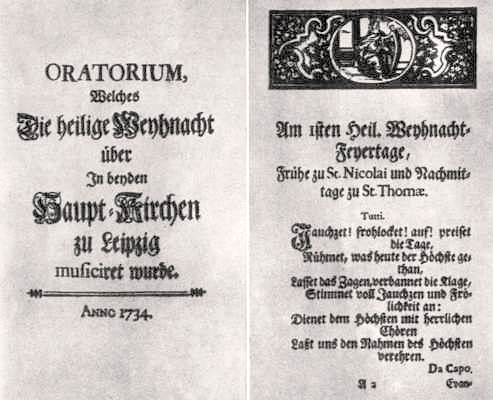
Title page of the printed libretto

Bach led the first performance during a morning rendition at the Nikolaikirche in 1734. The libretto was printed and bears the title of the oratorio, Oratorium, welches die Heilige Weyhnacht über in beyden Haupt-Kirchen zu Leipzig musiciret wurde. Anno 1734. (Oratorio, which was played over the Holy Christmas in the two main churches of Leipzig. 1734.) The title for Jauchzet! frohlocket! reads: "Am 1sten Heil. Weynachts-Feyertage. Frühe zu St. Nicolai, und Nachmittage zu St. Thomas" (On the 1st Holy Christmas Day. Morning at St. Nicholas, afternoon at St. Thomas).

== Music ==
=== Scoring and structure ===
Bach structured the cantata in nine movements, beginning with an extended chorus. The other eight movements contain a Gospel reading in a tenor secco recitative, a meditative, accompanied recitative, a prayer-like aria, and an affirming chorale. It features three vocal soloists (alto, tenor and bass), a four-part choir (SATB) and a Baroque instrumental ensemble of three trumpets (Tr), timpani, two traversos (Tra), two oboes (Ob), two oboes d'amore (Oa), two violins (Vl), viola (Va) and basso continuo. A typical performance lasts 29 minutes.

The following scoring adheres to the Neue Bach-Ausgabe (New Bach Edition). The keys and time signatures are taken from Dürr and use the symbol for common time. The continuo, played throughout, is not shown.

Movements of Jauchzet, frohlocket!
No.	Title	Text	Type	Vocal	Brass	Winds	Strings	Key	Time
1	Jauchzet, frohlocket!	anon.	Chorus	SATB	3Tr	2Tra 2Ob	2Vl Va	D major	3/8
2	Es begab sich aber zu der Zeit	Luke 2:1, 3–6	Recitative	T					common time
3	Nun wird mein liebster Bräutigam	anon.	Recitative	A		2Oa			common time
4	Bereite dich, Zion	anon.	Aria	A		Oa	Vl	A minor	3/8
5	Wie soll ich dich empfangen	Gerhardt	Chorale	SATB		2Tra 2Ob	2Vl Va	A minor	common time
6	Und sie gebar ihren ersten Sohn	Luke 2:7	Recitative	T					common time
7	Er ist auf Erden kommen arm Wer will die Liebe recht erhöhn	Luther anon.	Chorale e recitative	S B		2Oa		G major	3/4
8	Großer Herr und starker König	anon.	Aria	B	Tr	Tra	2Vl Va	D major	2/4
9	Ach mein herzliebes Jesulein	Luther	Chorale	SATB	3Tr	2Tra 2Ob	2Vl Va	D major	4/4

=== Movements ===
==== 1 ====
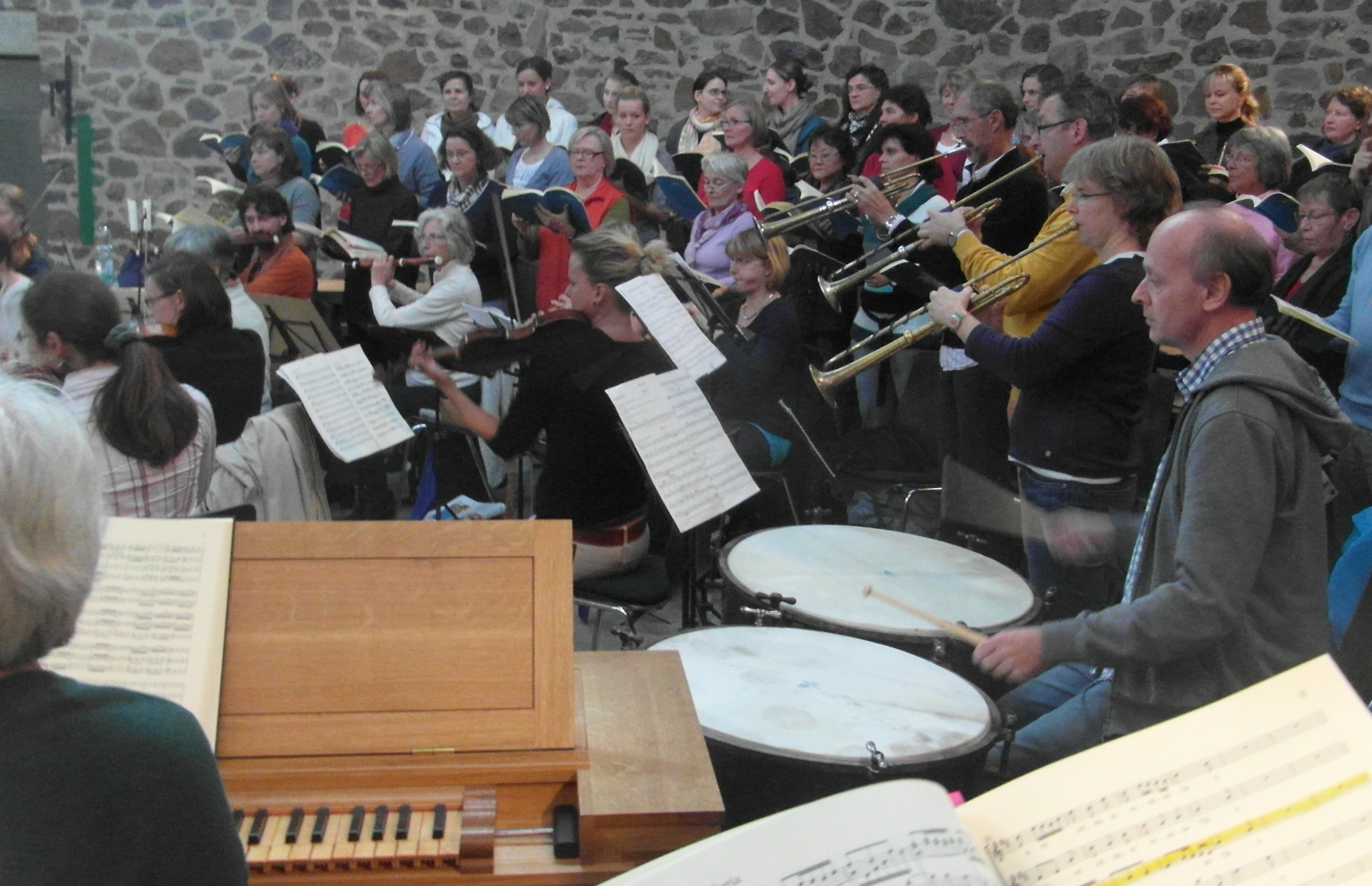
Baroque orchestra with timpani (kettledrums) and trumpets

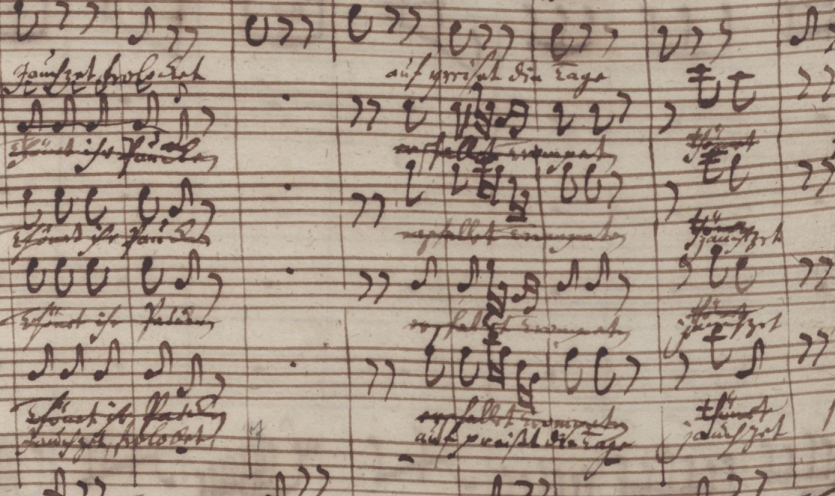
Detail from the manuscript score of Tönet, ihr Pauken with changes for Jauchzet, frohlocket!

The text of the opening chorus is "Jauchzet, frohlocket! Auf, preiset die Tage", translated by Richard D. P. Jones as "Shout for joy, exult, rise up, praise the day!" and by Pamela Dellal as "Celebrate, rejoice, rise up and praise these days". It is an extended complex ternary form (A–B–A). Unusually for Bach's music, it opens with the timpani (kettledrums) alone. The trumpets then enter, followed by strings and woodwinds. This sequence follows the secular model Tönet, ihr Pauken, where the text asks the instruments to enter in this order: "Tönet, ihr Pauken! Erschallet, Trompeten! Klingende Saiten, erfüllet die Luft! Singet itzt Lieder, ihr muntren Poeten," (Sound, you drums! Ring forth, trumpets! Vibrating strings, fill the air! Now sing songs, you exuberant poets). The extended instrumental ritornello presents the musical material of the whole movement in changing instrumental colours. The first measures explore the D major triad in different colours of instrumental sounds.

The voices enter in unison, imitating at first timpani then trumpets. In the following section, the vocal lines are mostly homophonic and sometimes imitative, while the instrumental forces drive the movement. With the text "Lasset das Zagen, verbannet die Klage" (Abandon despair, banish laments), the voices, now in imitation, dominate while the instruments accompany. The second section is a modified repetition of the first.

The middle section (B) also comprises two passages. "Dienet dem Höchsten mit herrlichen Chören" (Serve the Highest with glorious choruses) is an imitative section in B minor, accompanied only by the strings. "Laßt uns den Namen des Herrschers verehren!" (Let us revere the name of the sovereign) is set mostly in homophony with strings and woodwinds. After the middle section, the beginning A is repeated in full.

The musicologist Markus Rathey notes that in the secular model, Tönet, ihr Pauken, Bach had not initially thought of beginning with the timpani alone, but arrived at the present version in a later revision. Rathey suggests that Bach sought a more dramatic way to begin with reduced force and let the music increase, in keeping with his endeavor to transfer operatic features from Dresden to Leipzig. Rathey observes that listeners at the time may have interpreted the dominant trumpets as royal instruments, here three trumpets and timpani, corresponding to the obbligato trumpet in the aria "Großer Herr und starker König", which addresses the newborn as both king and saviour.

==== 2 ====
The tenor begins with the secco recitative "Es begab sich aber zu der Zeit" (It came to pass at that time), from Luke 2:1,3–6. It is one of the longest recitatives in the oratorio, beginning with the decree for a census by Caesar Augustus. It follows a pattern influenced both by operatic recitatives and liturgical singing, with phrases often beginning with an upward fourth and ending with a downward fourth, in rhythm as if speaking and in moderate range. Accents are made by high notes, here for the word "Joseph", and changes of harmony, here for "David". The building of harmonic tension ends when Mary's pregnancy is mentioned.

==== 3 ====
The alto provides the narration, particularly the announcement of a birth, in a recitative, "Nun wird mein liebster Bräutigam, nun wird der Held aus Davids Stamm" (Now my dearest bridegroom, now the hero from David's branch), expressing eagerness to meet her bridegroom, a descendant of David, in the imagery of the Song of Songs. In an accompanied recitative, two oboes d'amore support the voice.

==== 4 ====
Juxtaposition of corresponding measures in the secular model and the aria

In the alto da capo aria "Bereite dich, Zion, mit zärtlichen Trieben" (Prepare yourself, Zion, with tender efforts), the singer prepares herself to meeting her beloved. The oboe d'amore supports the tender expressiveness. The movement is based on the aria "Ich will dich nicht hören" (No. 9) from the secular cantata Laßt uns sorgen, laßt uns wachen, BWV 213, with a different affect. While the secular model demands destruction ("zermalmet"), the aria in the oratorio speaks of the most beautiful beloved ("den Liebsten, den Schönsten").

==== 5 ====
A chorale concludes the first scene, "Wie soll ich dich empfangen" (How shall I embrace You), deepening the right preparation for the reception of the beloved. It is the first stanza of Paul Gerhardt's Advent song, with the melody which was associated with it in Leipzig, the same melody also used for Gerhardt's Passion hymn "O Haupt voll Blut und Wunden". The same melody of this first chorale in the oratorio reappears in the final movement of the final Part VI, "Nun seid ihr wohl gerochen".

Paul Gerhardt:

Wie soll ich dich empfangen
und wie begegn ich dir,
o aller Welt Verlangen,
o meiner Seelen Zier?
O Jesu, Jesu, setze
mir selbst die Fackel bei,
damit, was dich ergötze,
mir kund und wissend sei.

Catherine Winkworth:

O Lord, how shall I meet You,
how welcome You aright?
Your people long to greet You,
my Hope, my heart's Delight!
O, kindle, Lord most holy,
Your lamp within my breast
to do in spirit lowly
all that may please You best.

==== 6 ====
The tenor continues the narration with another secco recitative, "Und sie gebar ihren ersten Sohn" (And she bore her first son), after Luke 2:7, reporting the birth of the baby which is laid in a manger.

==== 7 ====
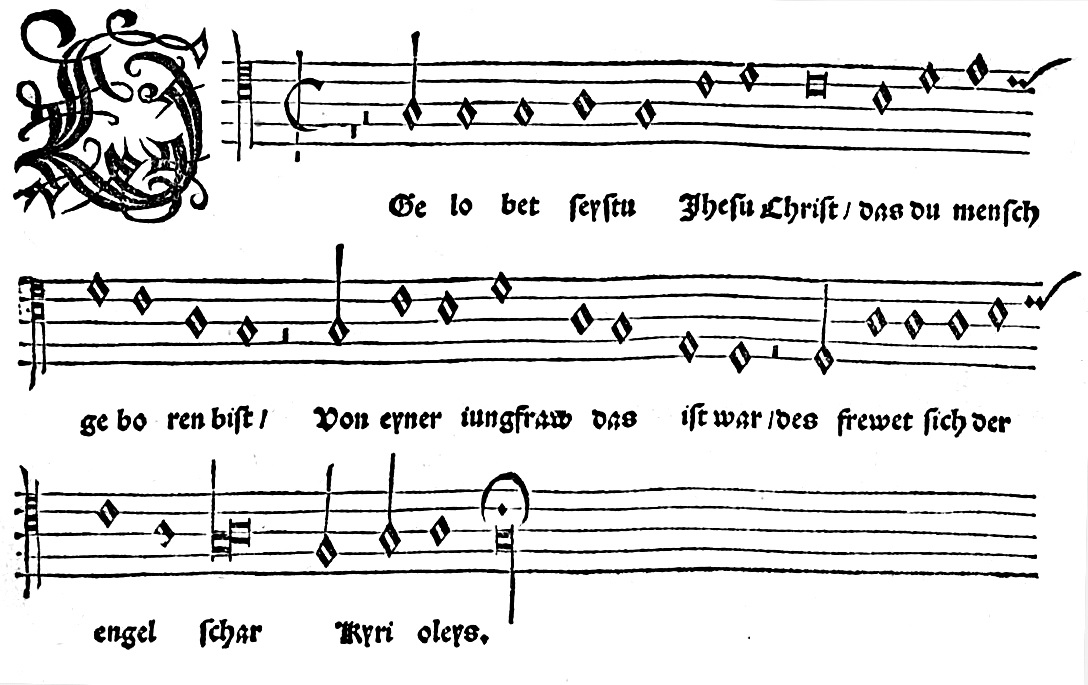
The chorale melody of "Gelobet seist du, Jesu Christ" in Johann Walter's Wittenberg Hymnal

In a combination of chorale and recitative, the soprano sings the sixth stanza, "Er ist auf Erden kommen arm" (He came to earth poor), from Luther's hymn "Gelobet seist du, Jesu Christ" in a triple metre and embellished. Line by line, it is interspersed with comments by the bass, who begins "Wer will die Liebe recht erhöhn" (Who can rightly exalt this love), in contrasting common time. The voices are supported by two oboes d'amore.

==== 8 ====
The bass da capo aria, "Großer Herr und starker König, liebster Heiland, o wie wenig" (Great Lord, o powerful King, dearest Savior, o how little), contrasts the birth of Our Lord with poverty. The movement is taken from the bass aria in Tönet, ihr Pauken, in which the Queen is addressed, accompanied by an obbligato trumpet to refer to her royalty.

==== 9 ====
The cantata is closed with the chorale "Ach mein herzliebes Jesulein" (Ah, my heart's beloved little Jesus), the 13th stanza of Luther's hymn "Vom Himmel hoch, da komm ich her". While the compassionate text addresses the baby, interjections by trumpets and timpani recall the opening movement and refer to his godly nature.

Martin Luther:

Ach, mein herzliebes Jesulein,
Mach dir ein rein, sanft Bettelein,
Zu ruhen in meins Herzens Schrein,
Das ich nimmer vergesse dein.

Translation by Catherine Winkworth:

Ah! dearest Jesus, Holy Child,
Make Thee a bed, soft, undefiled,
Within my heart, that it may be
A quiet chamber kept for Thee.

Literal translation:

Ah! my dearest little Jesus
Make you a clean soft little bed,
To rest in my heart's shrine
That I never forget you.

== Performances and legacy ==
Bach may have performed Jauchzet, frohlocket! again, but there is no record of it. Although performances of Jauchzet, frohlocket! in Christmas Day services have become rare, they are regularly held in Leipzig where the work was first performed. The cantata is often presented in concerts that usually combine several of the parts of the Christmas Oratorio, most frequently parts I to III. It is a Christmas tradition for German-speaking people to attend such a concert.

Dürr and Jones described the cantata as "one of the pinnacles of world music literature". Rathey observes that although the Christmas Oratorio is one of Bach's most frequently performed works, it has not attracted much scholarship in English.

== Cited sources ==
Bach Digital

- "Jauchzet, frohlocket! Auf, preiset die Tage / (Christmas oratorio, part 1) BWV 248 I; BC D 7 I". Bach Digital.
- "Lasst uns sorgen, lasst uns wachen (Dramma per musica) BWV 213; BC G 18 / Secular cantata (unknown purpose)". Bach Digital.
- "Tönet, ihr Pauken! Erschallet, Trompeten! BWV 214; BC G 19 / Secular cantata (Birthday)". Bach Digital.
- "Christen, ätzet diesen Tag BWV 63; BC A 8 / Sacred cantata (1st Christmas Day)". Bach Digital.
- "Gelobet seist du, Jesu Christ [early version] BWV 91.1; BWV 91 / Chorale cantata (1st Christmas Day)". Bach Digital.
- "Unser Mund sei voll Lachens BWV 110; BC A 10 / Sacred cantata (1st Christmas Day)". Bach Digital.
- "Ehre sei Gott in der Höhe BWV 197a; BC A 11 / Sacred cantata (1st Christmas Day)". Bach Digital.

Books

- Buelow, George J. (2016). The Late Baroque Era. Vol. 4. From the 1680s to 1740. Springer. ISBN 978-1-34-911303-3.
- Dürr, Alfred; Jones, Richard D. P. (2006). The Cantatas of J. S. Bach: With Their Librettos in German-English Parallel Text. Oxford University Press. pp. 102–105, 820. ISBN 978-0-19-929776-4.
- Rathey, Markus (2016). Johann Sebastian Bach's Christmas Oratorio: Music, Theology, Culture. Oxford University Press. pp. 148–152. ISBN 978-0-19-027526-6.
- Wessel, Jens (2015). "Köthen (1717–1723)" (PDF). J. S. Bach und die italienische Oper / Drammi per musica für das kurfürstlich-sächsische und polnische Königshaus zwischen 1733 und 1736 (dissertation) (in German). Hochschule für Musik und Theater Hamburg. pp. 25–44, 47, 99–100.
- Wolff, Christoph (2002). Johann Sebastian Bach: The Learned Musician. W. W. Norton & Company. ISBN 978-0-393-32256-9.

Online sources

- Bischof, Walter F. (2018). "BWV 248I Jauchzet, frohlocket! Auf, preiset die Tage / Weihnachts-Oratorium I". University of Alberta.
- Dahn, Luke (2018). "BWV 248.5". bach-chorales.com.
- Dahn, Luke (2018). "BWV 248.9". bach-chorales.com.
- Dellal, Pamela (2021). "BWV 248-I – Jauchzet, frohlocket, auf, preiset die Tage". pameladellal.com.
- Dellal, Pamela (2021). "BWV 214 – Tönet, ihr Pauken! Erschallet, Trompeten!". pameladellal.com.
- Hofmann, Klaus (2005). "Johann Sebastian Bach / Weihnachtsoratorium / Christmas Oratorio" (PDF). Carus-Verlag. p. V.
- Rathey, Markus (18 April 2003). "Johann Sebastian Bach's Mass in B Minor: The Greatest Artwork of All Times and All People" (PDF). ism.yale.edu. Archived from the original (PDF) on 15 July 2014.
- Schönewolf, Markus (2019). "J. S. Bach, Weihnachtsoratorium: Werkeinführung und Libretto". schoenewolf.com (in German).
- "Ah! Lord, how shall I meet Thee" (PDF). Konzerthaus Dortmund (in German). 6 December 2008. Archived from the original (PDF) on 15 November 2019.
- "Ah! Lord, how shall I meet Thee". hymnary.org.
