= Ermuntre dich, mein schwacher Geist =

1641 German Christmas carol

- Christmas carol
- Other name: "Brich an, du schönes Morgenlicht"
- Text: Johann Rist
- Language: German
- Melody: Johann Schop
- Published: 1641

"Ermuntre dich, mein schwacher Geist" is a German Christmas carol with lyrics by Johann Rist and a melody by Johann Schop, first published in 1641. Historically it was contained in Protestant hymnals, but the current one, Evangelisches Gesangbuch, uses only three of its stanzas, the ninth, the second and the twelfth, titled "Brich an, du schönes Morgenlicht". This stanza was used by Johann Sebastian Bach as a chorale in Part II of his 1734 Christmas Oratorio.

== History ==
Johann Rist wrote the text of "Ermuntre dich, mein schwacher Geist" as a Christmas carol in twelve stanzas. The melody by Johann Schop was first published with the text in Lüneburg in 1641, as the opening song of Rist's collection Himlischer Lieder (of heavenly songs). The song is titled "Lob-Gesang. Von der frewdenreichen Geburt vnd Menschwerdung vnsers Hernn und Heylandes Jesu Christi" (Song of praise. Of the joyful birth and incarnation of our Lord and Redeemer Jesus Christ). It was reprinted in Protestant hymnals, beginning in Johann Crüger's Praxis pietatis melica of 1648 or 1653, with a slightly revised melody. A Lutheran hymnal from the 19th century has the hymn in nine stanzas. In the 1878 lexicon of hymns of all times, the song is described as most often rendered in nine stanzas.

The modern Protestant hymnal, Evangelisches Gesangbuch, uses only three of the song's stanzas, the ninth, the second and the twelfth of the original, under the title "Brich an, du schönes Morgenlicht".

In the Evangelical Lutheran Hymnary, the hymn is number #118 and begins with "Arise, My Soul, Sing Joyfully", cut to four stanzas, using the translation made for the 1973 Australian The Lutheran Hymnal. In Lutheran Service Book, the hymn is #378, cut to three verses with "Break forth" as the first stanza. In Worship Supplement 2000, one verse, "Break forth", is included as hymn #714. Moravian Book of Worship includes "Break forth" as hymn #287 in one stanza. The Baptist Hymnal 2008 includes a second stanza to "Break forth" written by Arthur Tozer Russell as hymn #210. A second stanza by Russell following "Break forth" as the first verse is also found in the Ambassador Hymnal as hymn #49. In the 1993 Christian Worship, "Break forth" cut to a single stanza is hymn #44, but it will be omitted from the upcoming Christian Worship Hymnal.

== Text and tune ==
The text begins with a call of the individual singer to self, to contemplate the birth of the Saviour. The ninth stanza refers to the light that the shepherds see, saying "Brich an, du schönes Morgenlicht" (Break, you beautiful morning light), tells the shepherds not to be afraid, and announces that the weak little boy will ultimately bring peace.

== Musical settings ==
Vincent Lübeck composed a Christmas cantata, Willkommen, süßer Bräutigam (Welcome, sweet bridegroom), beginning with the hymn's second stanza. Johann Sebastian Bach set the text and tune of the ninth stanza, "Brich an, du schönes Morgenlicht", as a chorale in Part II of his 1734 Christmas Oratorio, as the reaction of the shepherds to the light in the sky, beginning the annunciation to the shepherds.

In 1735, Bach set the text as a sacred song for Schemellis Gesangbuch, scored for voice and continuo in nine of the twelve stanzas, BWV 454. In 1777, his son Johann Christoph Friedrich Bach used the setting from the Christmas Oratorio as the 6th movement of his Ascension Oratorio, first performed then in Bückeburg.
