= Laßt uns sorgen, laßt uns wachen, BWV 213 =

Cantata by Johann Sebastian Bach

Laßt uns sorgen, laßt uns wachen
- BWV 213
- Dramma per musica by J. S. Bach
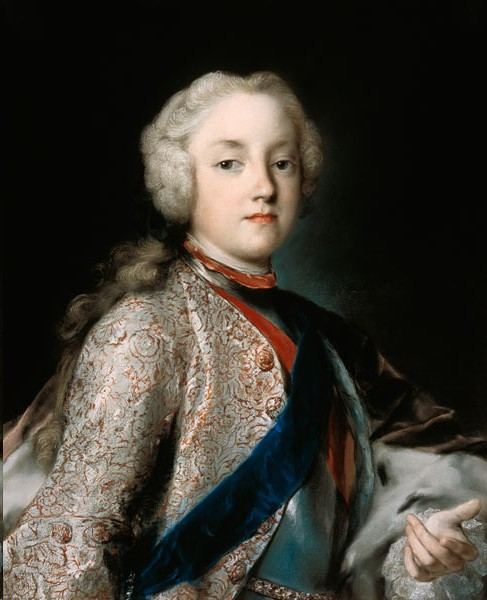
- Friedrich Christian, for whose birthday the cantata was written
- Related: Christmas Oratorio; Mass in B minor
- Text: Picander
- Performed: 5 September 1733: Leipzig
- Movements: 13
- Vocal: SATB soloists and choir
- Instrumental: 2 horns; oboe d'amore; 2 oboes; 2 violins; viola; continuo

Laßt uns sorgen, laßt uns wachen (Let us take care, let us watch over), BWV 213, (Note: "BWV" is Bach-Werke-Verzeichnis, a thematic catalogue of Bach's works.) is a secular cantata by Johann Sebastian Bach. Bach composed it in Leipzig on a text by Picander and first performed it on 5 September 1733. It is also known as Die Wahl des Herkules (The choice of Hercules) and Hercules am Scheidewege (Hercules at the crossroads).

== History and text ==
The work is a dramma per musica describing the story of "Hercules at the crossroads". Bach composed the cantata for the 11th birthday of Crown Prince Friedrich Christian of Saxony, to a text by Picander. It was first performed in Leipzig on 5 September 1733 at Zimmermann's coffeehouse, where Bach's Coffee Cantata was also first performed.

Bach used the aria "Schlafe, mein Liebster" in a revised form in Und es waren Hirten in derselben Gegend, Part II of his Christmas Oratorio. Bach also reused the aria "Auf meinen Flügeln sollst du schweben" to form the aria Ich will nur dir zu Ehren leben in Part 4 of his Christmas Oratorio. A duet of the cantata and the duet "Et in unum Dominum" from his Mass in B minor share a common lost base.

The cantata is counted among the works for celebrations of the Leipzig University, Festmusiken zu Leipziger Universitätsfeiern.

== Scoring and structure ==
The cantata has four vocal soloists: Lust (soprano), Hercules (alto), Virtue (tenor), and Mercury (bass). It is also scored for a four-part choir, two horns, oboe d'amore, two oboes, two violins, two violas (or viola and bassoon), and basso continuo.

The cantata has 13 movements:

1. Chorus: Laßt uns sorgen, laßt uns wachen
2. Recitative (alto): Und wo? Wo ist die rechte Bahn
3. Aria (soprano): Schlafe, mein Liebster, und pflege der Ruh
4. Duet recitative (soprano, tenor): Auf! folge meiner Bahn
5. Aria (alto): Treues Echo dieser Orten
6. Recitative (tenor): Mein hoffnungsvoller Held
7. Aria (tenor): Auf meinen Flügeln sollst du schweben
8. Recitative (tenor): Die weiche Wollust locket zwar
9. Aria (alto): Ich will dich nicht hören
10. Duet recitative (alto, tenor): Geliebte Tugend, du allein
11. Duet aria (alto, tenor): Ich bin deine, du bist meine
12. Recitative (bass): Schaut, Götter, dieses ist ein Bild
13. Chorus: Lust der Völker, Lust der Deinen

== Music ==
The opening movement presents a choir of deities giving homage to the young Hercules, with "lullaby-like" chordal instrumental accompaniment. In the first recitative, Hercules establishes the "crossroads" at which he finds himself: a choice between the right path and following his desires. Lust responds with a lullaby-like aria to lure Hercules. The duet recitative "encapsulates the age-old good angel/bad angel, good cop/bad cop dichotomy", leading into an aria in which Hercules is "vacillating between them". The aria adopts the "echo" form prominent in early Italian opera: another alto voice engages in imitative exchanges with Hercules and with the instrumental lines. Virtue proceeds with a secco recitative and "ebullient" aria entreating Hercules to follow the right path that he might "soar on his wings like an eagle to the stars". Virtue concludes with another secco recitative warning Hercules not to succumb to Lust's temptations. Hercules sings a da capo aria expressing his conviction to follow Virtue's advice. The accompanying instrumental lines represent the "writhing of serpents ... being torn apart" by his choice. He then sings a duet recitative with Virtue: "metaphorically she 'weds' herself to him and they end together with a vow of unity". This moves into a long duet aria "with all the quiet tranquility of a love song but, perhaps, one that commits minds and emotions rather than bodies". The character of Mercury appears for the first time in the penultimate movement, accompanied by a "haze of God-like mysticism" created by the strings. The closing chorus is combined with a bass arioso in which Mercury addresses the Crown Prince directly. The movement is stylistically a gavotte with a balanced structure contrasting orchestra and chorus with the bass solo.

== Recordings ==
- Figuralchor der Gedächtniskirche Stuttgart / Bach-Collegium Stuttgart, Helmuth Rilling. J. S. Bach: Hercules auf dem Scheidwege · Cembalokonzert BWV 1058. Cantate-Musicaphon, 1967.
- Choir & Orchestra of the Age of Enlightenment, Gustav Leonhardt. J. S. Bach: Secular Cantata BWV 211 & 213. Philips, 1994.
- RIAS-Kammerchor / Akademie für Alte Musik Berlin, René Jacobs. J. S. Bach: Cantate Profanes. Harmonia Mundi France, 1994.
- Amsterdam Baroque Orchestra & Choir, Ton Koopman. J. S. Bach: Complete Cantatas Vol. 5. Erato, 1996.

== Cited sources ==
- "Lasst uns sorgen, lasst uns wachen (Dramma per musica) BWV 213: Secular cantata". Bach Digital. Leipzig: Bach Archive; et al. 2020-08-19.
