= Richard D. P. Jones =

British musicologist

Richard Douglas P. Jones is a British musicologist and editor, known especially for his work as a Bach scholar. After graduating from the University of Oxford, he has taught at Cardiff University and Sheffield University.

== Selected publications ==
=== Editing work ===
Jones prepared the two-volume Urtext edition of the Six Sonatas for Violin and Harpsichord, BWV 1014–1019 published by Oxford University Press in 1993.

Jones has edited the following keyboard works by Bach:

- Clavierübung I (for the Neue Bach-Ausgabe)
- The Well-Tempered Clavier (for the Associated Board of the Royal Schools of Music). This scholarly edition was the winner of the Music Retailers Association's Standard Publication Award for 1994.

In 1997 he was appointed editor of piano examination pieces for the Associated Board of the Royal Schools of Music.

=== Translation ===
Jones translated Alfred Dürr's standard work on Bach's cantatas to English.

- Dürr, Alfred; Jones, Richard D. P. (2006). The Cantatas of J. S. Bach: With Their Librettos in German-English Parallel Text. Oxford University Press. ISBN 9780199297764.

=== Book about Bach ===
Jones wrote The Creative Development of J. S. Bach in two volumes, published in 2007 and 2013 by Oxford University Press. David Ledbetter notes in a review of volume I for Early Music that the book is focused on the "composer's creative development", not found in comparable books: Christoph Wolff provided biographical details; David Schulenberg provided commentaries on individual keyboard pieces; Peter Williams discussed the complete organ works in the order of the BWV catalogue; and Alfred Dürr described the Bach cantatas following the liturgical year. Ledbetter summarises: "Anybody wishing to get to grips with the music of Bach will be well advised to equip themselves with this survey as their starting point." A review of volume II by Peter Smaill compares "outstanding musical analysis" of the "all-embracing study of Bach's musical creativity, year by year" to the biography in three volumes by Philipp Spitta.

- The Creative Development of Johann Sebastian Bach, Volume I: 1695–1717: Music to Delight the Spirit. Oxford University Press. 2007. ISBN 978-0-19-816440-1.
- The Creative Development of Johann Sebastian Bach, Volume II: 1717–1750: Music to Delight the Spirit. Oxford University Press. 2013. ISBN 978-0-19-969628-4.
