= Discography of Bach's Magnificat =

Recordings of work by Johann Sebastian Bach

Performances of Johann Sebastian Bach's Magnificat come in three formats:

1. D major version, BWV 243 with the twelve movements of that version;
2. D major version, with the Christmas interpolations from the earlier version BWV 243a transposed and inserted after movements 2, 5, 7 and 9.
3. E flat major version, BWV 243a. The difference with the previous format is not only the key signature, there are also differences in orchestration, e.g. in the earlier version flutes are not part of the tutti, so do not play in the choral movements 1, 7 and 12, and a trumpet solo in movement 10 instead of the later unison oboes. Other differences are minor, but there is for instance a slightly harsher harmony near the end of movement 4 in the earlier version.

== Versions of Bach's Magnificat ==
The extant autographs of Bach's Magnificat show three versions of his Magnificat:

- E♭ major version without Christmas interpolations, which is how it was probably first performed, at least the autograph of the E♭ major version of the Magnificat (BWV 243a) suggests that Bach intended to perform the first version of his Magnificat also without the laudes, depending on circumstances, for example on other feasts than Christmas.
- E♭ major version with Christmas interpolations, this is how Bach had the piece performed at Christmas 1723. The last measures of the fourth Christmas interpolation are however missing in the autograph.
- D major version (BWV 243), this is the reworked version, without Christmas laudes Bach had performed for the first time at the Marian feast of Visitation 1733.

The first of these versions (BWV 243a without Christmas additions) is not usually performed, while Bach's final version (BWV 243, also without Christmas additions) with its more elaborate orchestration is the most often programmed. The hybrid version (BWV 243, with the Christmas interpolations of BWV 243a transposed and inserted) has found performers and audiences, although BWV 243a, with a reconstructed end of the fourth interpolation, has become more of a standard for performances of the Magnificat including the Christmas interpolations.

Magnificat by Johann Sebastian Bach			BWV 243.1 (243a) Christmas 1723 version			BWV 243.2 (243) Visitation 1733 version		
No. and title	Time	Voices	Instruments	Key	Autogr. p.	Instruments	Key	Autogr. p.
1. Magnificat	3/4	SSATB	tutti	E♭	1–9	tutti	D	1–15
2. Et exultavit	3/8	sII	2Vl Va Bc	E♭	3–7	2Vl Va Bc	D	16–18
A. Vom Himmel hoch	cut time	SATB		E♭	23, 25–27			
3. Quia respexit	common time	sI	Ob Bc	c	8–9	OaI Bc	b	18–19
4. Omnes generationes	common time	SSATB	2Ob 2Vl Va Bc	g	10–12	2Fl 2Oa 2Vl Va Bc	f♯	20–25
5. Quia fecit	common time	b	Bc	B♭	12–13	Bc	A	20–23
B. Freut euch und jubiliert	common time	SSAT	Bc	B♭	28–30			
6. Et misericordia	12/8	a t	2Vl Va Bc	f	13–15	2Fl 2Vl Va Bc	e	24–28
7. Fecit potentiam	common time	SSATB	tutti	E♭	15–19	tutti	D	28–34
C. Gloria in excelsis	common time	SSATB	Vl Bc	E♭	30–31			
8. Deposuit potentes	3/4	t	2Vl Va Bc	g	17–20	2Vl Bc	f♯	34–36
9. Esurientes	common time	a	2Fl Bc	F	20–21	2Fl Bc	E	36–38
D. Virga Jesse floruit	12/8	sI b	Bc	F	32			
10. Suscepit Israel	common time	sI sII a	TrI Ba	c	22	Ob Bc	b	38–40
11. Sicut locutus est	common time	SSATB	Bc	E♭	23–24	Bc	D	40–42
12. Gloria Patri; Sicut erat in principio	3/4	SSATB	tutti	E♭	24–27 27–29	tutti	D	42–45 45–48

== Recordings ==
Differences in recorded performances show some evolution: early performances, often with large choirs, and orchestras of symphonic breadth, tend to have a slower pace, with performance times over thirty minutes (or over 40 minutes when the Christmas interpolations are included) being no exceptions. More recent performance practice leans towards leaner groups of vocalists and smaller orchestras, often using period instruments, and tailored as historically informed performance. Tempos became more vivid and the performance time may be reduced to about twenty minutes for the D major version, and even less than thirty minutes for the full BWV 243a version.

Other differences include whether organ or harpsichord are used as continuo instrument, whether countertenors and/or treble youngsters perform vocal parts, and whether it is recorded with a live audience. Acoustic characteristics of the recording can further be influenced by the performance location, e.g. with our without the high reverberation typical for large church buildings.

For movement D (Virga Jesse), with the end missing in the extant autograph, earlier performances may stop the last Christmas interpolation where the score ends, since, however, in the late 20th century a similarity had been remarked between this piece and another movement in one of Bach's cantatas, a reconstructed ending, based on that composition is more often performed.

Bach composed the work for five soloists: two sopranos, alto, tenor and bass. The soloists are usually listed in the order SI–SII–A–T–B, although some recordings list only one soprano soloist.

Recordings of Bach's Magnificat
Title	Conductor / Choir / Orchestra	Soloists	Label	Year	Additional info
Joh. Sebast. Bach: Magnificat D-Dur BWV 243	Robert Shaw RCA Victor Chorale RCA Victor Orchestra	Susanne Freil; Blanche Thebom; Ernice Lawrence; Paul Matthen	RCA Victor	1946 (LP)	BWV 243 – 28:29; RCA Victor 10-1378-A
Joh. Sebast. Bach: Magnificat D-Dur BWV 243	Wolfgang Gönnenwein Süddeutscher Madrigalchor Deutsche Bachsolisten	Helen Donath; Birgit Finnilä; Peter Schreier; Barry McDaniel	Cantata	1966? (LP)	BWV 243 – 32:00
Magnificats "BACH: MAGNIFICAT in D Major (with 4 Christmas Interpolations)"	Helmuth Rilling Figuralchor der Gedächtniskirche Stuttgart Bach-Collegium Stuttgart	Romy Gundermann; Hildegard Rütgers; Kurt Equiluz; Erich Wenk	Turnabout Vox	1967 (LP)	BWV 243 & laudes from BWV 243a – 40:06; Also included in: Christmas Magnificats (CD) and Compare (2014 CD)
Maderna: Desprez J.S.Bach G.Gabrieli-Maderna Stravinskij "Magnificat in mi bemolle maggiore, BWV 243a"	Bruno Maderna choir and orchestra of Südwestdeutscher Rundfunk	Hedy Graf; Hildegard Laurich; Adalbert Kraus; Michael Schopper	Arkadia	1971 (rec.); 1991 (CD)	BWV 243a – Live performance 1991 CD: Volume 8 of Maderna Edition
Bach: Magnificat in D (Including Christmas Interpolations) "Magnificat in D, BWV 243, with Christmas Interpolations, BWV 243a"	Wolfgang Gönnenwein Süddeutscher Madrigalchor Deutsche Bachsolisten	Helen Donath; Gundula Bernàt-Klein; Birgit Finnilä; Peter Schreier; Barry McDaniel	Sine Qua Non	1975 (LP)	BWV 243 & laudes from BWV 243a – 41:50; Also included in: J.S. Bach: Magnificat original version with Christmas verses (1976 LP) and J.S. Bach: Cantatas 142, 65 & Magnificat (CD)
Edition Bachakademie Vol. 140	Helmuth Rilling Gächinger Kantorei Bach-Collegium Stuttgart	Sibylla Rubens; Ruth Sandhoff; Ingeborg Danz; Marcus Ullmann; Klaus Häger	Hänssler	2000 (CD)	BWV 243a
J. S. Bach: Magnificat BWV in E-flat major 243a – Cantata BWV 10	Roland Büchner Regensburger Domspatzen Musica Florea	Susanne Rydén; Heidrun Kordes; Drew Minter; Markus Brutscher; Peter Harvey	Pure Classics – Glissando	2000 (CD)	BWV 243a – Boys choir
Magnificat zur Weihnachtsvesper BWV 243a	Rolf Schweizer Motettenchor Pforzheim L'arpa festante	Susanna Cornelius; Claudia Darius; Hans Jörg Mammel; Matthias Horn	Amati	2000 (CD)	BWV 243a – Period instruments
J.S. Bach: Magnificat BWV 243a (with cantata BWV 63) Leipziger Weihnachtskantaten (2CD-set also containing cantatas BWV 91, 121, and 133)	Philippe Herreweghe Collegium Vocale Gent	Dorothée Blotzky-Mields; Carolyn Sampson; Ingeborg Danz; Mark Padmore; Sebastian Noack	Harmonia Mundi	2002 (rec.); 2003 (CDs)	BWV 243a – Period instruments Also included in: J.S. Bach: Magnificat (2007 CD) → Reviews
Bach – Kuhnau: Magnificat	Ton Koopman Amsterdam Baroque Orchestra & Choir	Deborah York; Orlanda Velez Isidro; Bogna Bartosz; Jörg Dürmüller; Klaus Mertens	Naxos	2003 (rec.); 2004 (DVD)	BWV 243a – Period instruments – Live performance
A. Lotti: Missa Sapientiae / J.S. Bach: Magnificat BWV 243a	Thomas Hengelbrock Balthasar-Neumann-Chor Balthasar-Neumann-Ensemble	Dorothee Mields; Constanze Backes; Bernhard Landauer; Jürgen Banholzer; Hermann Oswald; Wolf Matthias Friedrich	Deutsche Harmonia Mundi	2008 (CD)	BWV 243a – Period instruments

=== Reviews ===
==== Herreweghe 2002 ====
- ClassicsToday.com: "bracing but not rushed tempos, infectiously energetic and technically solid contributions from the chorus, and an intelligently paced flow from movement to movement."
- The Guardian: "Herreweghe's accounts are typically thoughtful, not at all theatrical or dramatically driven, and that slightly laid-back approach takes the edge off the Magnificat too, though the quality of the solo and choral singing, and the careful shaping of the orchestral lines are all exemplary."

== Sources ==
Scores

- Bach, Johann Sebastian. Magnificat in E-flat major.
  - (1720–1739) Autograph: Magnificat E-flat major and Christmas hymns (Berlin, Staatsbibliothek zu Berlin – Preußischer Kulturbesitz, D-B Mus. ms. Bach P 38, at www.bach-digital.de) Note: Virga Jesse incomplete
  - (1811) Pölchau, Georg, ed. (1811). Magnificat à cinque voci, due violini, due oboe, tre trombi, tamburi, basson, viola e basso continuo (1st ed.). Bonn: N. Simrock. OCLC 68145446. First edition of the Magnificat score, E-flat major version, without the Christmas hymns.
  - (1862) Von Himmel hoch (SATB) / Freut euch und jubiliert (SSAT, continuo) / Gloria (SSATB with colla parte instruments & violino obligato) / Virga Jesse (fragment – S, B, continuo). Bach-Gesellschaft Ausgabe, Volume 11.1, Appendix. Edited by Wilhelm Rust. Leipzig: Breitkopf & Härtel
  - (1959) Magnificat Es-dur: Herausgegeben von Alfred Dürr, Taschenpartituren No. 58. Bärenreiter, 1959.
  - (2014) "Magnificat Es-Dur BWV 243a (mit den vier Einlagesätzen: Vom Himmel hoch / Freut euch und jubilieret / Gloria in excelsis / Virga Jesse floruit). Für Soli (SSATB), Chor (SSATB), Orchester und Orgel (lat). Nach dem Urtext der Neuen Bach-Ausgabe. Ed. A. Dürr" (PDF) (in German). Bärenreiter. 2014. p. 3. Archived from the original (PDF) on 15 October 2014.
- Bach, Johann Sebastian. Magnificat in D major.
  - (c. 1732–1735) Autograph: Berlin, Staatsbibliothek zu Berlin – Preußischer Kulturbesitz, D-B Mus. ms. Bach P 39:
    - "Berlin, Staatsbibliothek zu Berlin – Preußischer Kulturbesitz : D-B Mus. ms. Bach P 39". Bach digital. Manuscript of BWV 243 at www.bach-digital.de
    - Composer's Manuscript at IMSLP
  - (1841) Magnificat in D-Dur : Klavierauszug, edited by Robert Franz. Breslau: Leuckart.
  - (1862) Bach-Gesellschaft Ausgabe, Band 11.1. Magnificat D dur und vier Sanctus, edited by Wilhelm Rust. Leipzig: Breitkopf & Härtel.
  - (1864) Magnificat (in D-dur) bearbeitet von Robert Franz. Leipzig: Leuckart
  - (1874) Magnificat in D, in vocal score with an accompaniment for the organ or pianoforte – The adaptation to English words by J. Troutbeck. Novello's Original Octavo Edition. Novello, Ewer and Co.
  - (1895) Magnificat in D dur: Klavierauszug von Salomon Jadassohn. Leipzig: Breitkopf und Härtel
  - (1924) Magnificat, edited by Arnold Schering. Ernst Eulenburg and Edition Peters.
  - (c. 1956) Neue Ausgabe sämtlicher Werke, Series 2: Messen, Passionen und oratorische Werke, Volume 3: Magnificat D-dur BWV 243: Klavierauszug (Eduard Müller). Kassel (etc.): Bärenreiter.
  - (c. 1956) Magnificat D-Dur, BWV 243. Urtext of the New Bach Edition (Alfred Dürr). Foreword by the editor in German. English translation by Hans Ferdinand Redlich. For solo voices (SSATB), chorus (SSATB) and orchestra. Parts for: fl1, fl2, ob1, ob2, bsn1, tpt1, tpt2, tpt3, timp. – organ – strings (3,3,2,2). Duration: 30 min.
  - (1959) Magnificat in D major, BWV 243 Urtext edition taken from: J.S. Bach, Neue Ausgabe sämtlicher Werke, Series II, Vol. 3: Magnificat (Alfred Dürr). Preface in German with English translation by Hans Ferdinand Redlich, Jeremy Noble and J. Bradford Robinson. Kassel / New York : Bärenreiter. 11th printing, 2005.
  - (2014) "Magnificat D-Dur BWV 243 (mit den vier Einlagesätzen aus der Es-Dur-Fassung BWV 243a, transponiert) für Soli (SSATB), Chor (SSATB), Orchester und Orgel (lat). Nach dem Urtext der Neuen Bach-Ausgabe. Ed. A. Dürr" (PDF) (in German). Bärenreiter. 2014. p. 3. Archived from the original (PDF) on 15 October 2014.
- Bach, Johann Sebastian. Magnificat in E-flat major and Magnificat in D major (published together)
  - (1955) Neue Ausgabe sämtlicher Werke, Series 2: Messen, Passionen und oratorische Werke, Volume 3: Magnificat: erste Fassung in Es-Dur BWV 243a, zweite Fassung in D-Dur BWV 243, edited by Alfred Dürr. Kassel, Bärenreiter.
  - (2000) Jenkins, Neil. "Bach Magnificat in D & E flat BWV 243 & 243a / (Novello edition ed. N. Jenkins)" (PDF). neiljenkins.info/. pp. 1–6.

Books

- Butler, Gregory (2008). J. S. Bach's Concerted Ensemble Music, the Concerto (in Bach perspectives). Vol. 7. University of Illinois Press. p. 53. ISBN 0-252-03165-2.
- Cantagrel, Gilles (2011). J.-S. Bach : Passions, messes, motets (in French). Fayard. p. 260. ISBN 978-2-213-66547-4.
- Fabian, Dorottya (2003). Bach performance practice, 1945–1975: a comprehensive review of sound recordings and literature. Ashgate Publishing, Ltd. ISBN 0-7546-0549-3.
- Glöckner, Andreas (2003). Bachs Es-Dur-Magnificat BWV 243a – eine genuine Weihnachtsmusik? (in German). Vol. 89. Bach-Jahrbuch. pp. 37–45.
- Jones, Richard D. P. (2013). The Creative Development of Johann Sebastian Bach, Volume II: 1717–1750: Music to Delight the Spirit. Oxford University Press. ISBN 978-0-19-969628-4.
- Schröder, Dorothea (2012). Johann Sebastian Bach. C.H. Beck. ISBN 978-0-19-969628-4.
- Schweitzer, Albert (1911). The Magnificat and the St. John, Chapter XXVI of J. S. Bach. Breitkopf & Härtel, Reprint: Dover, 1966. ISBN 0-486-21632-2.
- Spitta, Philipp (1899). Johann Sebastian Bach: his work and influence on the music of Germany, 1685–1750. Vol. 2. Novello. pp. 369–371.
- Steinberg, Michael (2005). Choral Masterworks: A Listener's Guide. Oxford University Press. pp. 31–34. ISBN 0-19-802921-7.
- Wolff, Christoph (1991). Bach: Essays on His Life and Music. Harvard University Press. ISBN 978-0-674-05926-9.
- Zenck, Martin (1986). Die Bach-Rezeption des späten Beethoven: zum Verhältnis von Musikhistoriographie und Rezeptionsgeschichtsschreibung der 'Klassik' (in supplement to the Archiv für Musikwissenschaft) (in German). Franz Steiner Verlag. p. 234. ISBN 978-3-515-03312-1.

Online sources

- Bawden, John. "Magnificat – John Rutter (b. 1945)". choirs.org.uk.
- Carl Philipp Emanuel Bach: Magnificat. Carus-Verlag.
- Dellal, Pamela (2012). "Bach Cantata Translations / BWV 243a – "Magnificat" (E-flat Major)". Emmanuel Music. Archived from the original on 2020-01-30.
- Grob, Jochen (2014). "BWV 243a, Magnificat Es-Dur / BC E 13" (in German). s-line.de. Archived from the original on 21 July 2015.
- Hogwood, Christopher (2011). "Keep it Short: J S Bach Magnificat". Gresham College.
- Oron, Aryeh (2013). "Magnificat in E flat major BWV 243a / Recordings". Bach Cantatas.
- "Magnificat BWV 243a / Conducted by Thomas Hengelbrock". Bach Cantatas. 2000.
- Prinz (2013). "Johann Sebastian und Carl Philipp Emanuel Bach / Magnificat-Vertonungen" (PDF). Archived from the original (PDF) on 10 December 2014.
- Rizzuti, Alberto (2013). "One Verse, Two Settings, and Three Strange Youths" (PDF). ojs.unito.it.
- Vernier, David. "J.S. Bach: Leipzig Christmas cantatas; Magnificat/Herreweghe". classicstoday.com.
- Wolff, Christoph (1998). "From konzertmeister to thomaskantor: Bach's cantata production 1713–1723" (PDF). bach-cantatas.com.
- Bach, Johann Sebastian. "Brich dem Hungrigen dein Brot BWV 39; BC A 96 / Cantata". Leipzig University. 1967.
- "Bach: Magnificat – Buxtehude: Magnificat anima mea. (Sleeve)". Amazon.
- "Bach: Magnificat, Kurt Thomas vs. Helmuth Rilling (Compare 2 Versions)". Amazon.
