= Magnificat in E-flat major, BWV 243a =

Composition by Johann Sebastian Bach

Magnificat
- by J. S. Bach
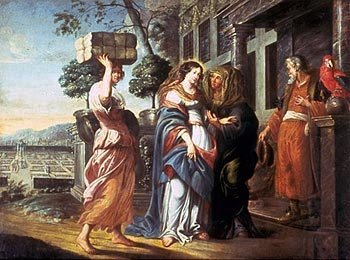
- Heimsuchung, occasion of the song of praise, Rubens school, Unionskirche, Idstein
- Key: E♭ major
- Catalogue: BWV 234a; BWV 243.1
- Related: basis for Magnificat in D major (1733)
- Occasion: Vespers on feast days
- Text: Luke 1:46–55; for Christmas: additional four interpolations
- Language: Latin; German
- Performed: 2 July 1723: Leipzig (Visitation); 25 December 1723 (Christmas)
- Movements: 12 (16 for Christmas)
- Vocal: SSATB choir and solo
- Instrumental: 3 trumpets; timpani; 2 recorders; 2 oboes; 2 violins; viola; continuo (including bassoon)

The Magnificat in E♭ major, BWV 243a, also BWV 243.1, by Johann Sebastian Bach is a musical setting of the Latin text of the Magnificat, Mary's canticle from the Gospel of Luke. It was composed in 1723 and is in twelve movements, scored for five vocal parts (two sopranos, alto, tenor and bass) and a Baroque orchestra of trumpets, timpani, oboes, strings and basso continuo including bassoon. Bach revised the work some ten years later, transposing it from E♭ major to D major, and creating the version mostly performed today, BWV 243.

The work was first performed in Leipzig in 1723. In May that year Bach assumed his position as Thomaskantor and embarked on an ambitious series of compositions. The Magnificat was sung at vesper services on feast days, and, as suggested by recent research, Bach's setting may have been written for a performance on 2 July, celebrating the Marian feast of the Visitation. For a Christmas celebration the same or a later year, he performed it at the Nikolaikirche with the insertion of four seasonal movements.

As a regular part of vespers, the canticle Magnificat was often set to music for liturgical use. Bach, as some of his contemporaries, devotes individual expression to every verse of the canticle, one even split in two for a dramatic effect. In a carefully designed structure, four choral movements are evenly distributed (1, 4, 7, 11). They frame sets of two or three movements sung by one to three voices, with individual instrumental colour. The work is concluded by a choral doxology (12), which ends in a recapitulation of the beginning on the text "as it was in the beginning". In Bach's Leipzig period, Magnificat is the first major work on a Latin text and for five vocal parts.

== Background ==
=== Bach's beginning in Leipzig ===
Bach composed the Magnificat in 1723, his first year as Thomaskantor in Leipzig, music director of the main Lutheran churches in the city. He had worked previously as an organist in Arnstadt, Mühlhausen and Weimar, where he was promoted to Konzertmeister (director of music) in 1714. From 1717 to 1723 he held a secular position at the court of Köthen. He applied for the post in Leipzig on 7 February 1723, performing two cantatas written for the audition on Estomihi or Quinquagesima, the last Sunday before Lent. In April he was accepted for the post, which he assumed on the first Sunday after Trinity, presenting a new cantata in 14 movement, Die Elenden sollen essen, BWV 75, on 30 May. A week later he led the new cantata Die Himmel erzählen die Ehre Gottes, BWV 76, again in 14 movements. The feast of the Visitation, celebrated always on 2 July, was a few weeks later the first Marian feast day of his tenure in Leipzig.

=== Magnificat ===
The canticle Magnificat, one of three New Testament canticles, has long been a regular part of the liturgy in daily vesper services. After the Reformation, Martin Luther kept the Magnificat in the liturgy. He provided a German translation of the canticle, "Meine Seele erhebt den Herren" (which Bach used as the basis for his chorale cantata Meine Seel erhebt den Herren, BWV 10). However, the Latin text was also permitted in Lutheran worship. The canticle was often set to music. Contemporary extended settings include works by Heinichen and by Vivaldi.

Bach had an audience familiar with the text and its background. In Leipzig, a Latin Magnificat was sung on the high holidays (Christmas, Easter and Pentecost, then performed on two of the three days of celebration) and on the three Marian feasts Annunciation, Visitation and Purification. According to some scholars, further feast days included New Year's Day, Epiphany, Feast of the Ascension, Trinity Sunday, St. John's Day and St. Michael's Day, and the vespers before the feast days.

== Composition history ==
Bach composed the work in 1723, his first year as Thomaskantor in Leipzig, probably for the feast of the Visitation. For the occasion, he presented the Magnificat as his first work on a Latin text and his first five-part choral setting in Leipzig. Otherwise, he used five voices in the funeral motet Jesu, meine Freude, the Missa in B minor, composed in 1733 for the court of Dresden, from which he derived the derived cantata Gloria in excelsis Deo, BWV 191, and in the Mass in B minor. Richard D. P. Jones notes: "Without exception these works lie outside the normal routine of Bach's sacred vocal works".

Bach probably first performed the Magnificat on the feast day, 2 July. Until 2003, most musicologists believed that Bach wrote the Magnificat for his first Christmas in Leipzig. Then Andreas Glöckner published Bachs Es-Dur-Magnificat BWV 243a – eine genuine Weihnachtsmusik? (Bach's Magnificat in E♭ major, BWV 243a – a genuine Christmas music?) in the Bach-Jahrbuch (Bach yearbook) 89, questioning the Christmas date in favour of Visitation the same year. Older sources naturally still have Christmas as the first performance, for example Neil Jenkins, the editor of an edition for Novello in 2000. He writes that the "new Thomaskantor was obviously intending to impress his new employer and the congregation", which makes even more sense at the beginning of Bach's tenure. Not all scholars follow Glöckner's arguments, but Jones agrees with Glöckner: "... may well have received its first performance at the Feast of the Visitation on 2 July 1723, only five weeks after he took up his Leipzig post."

For Christmas the same year, Bach performed his Magnificat with four inserted laudes, songs of praise related to Christmas, partly in German, partly in Latin. In a vespers service on 25 December 1723, he performed the cantata Christen, ätzet diesen Tag, BWV 63, and the Magnificat at the Nikolaikirche, on 26 December the cantata Darzu ist erschienen der Sohn Gottes, BWV 40, in the Thomaskirche.

Bach used as a cantus firmus in movement 10 the chant associated with Luther's German version of the Magnificat canticle, "Meine Seele erhebt den Herren". A year later Bach composed for the feast of the Visitation the chorale cantata Meine Seel erhebt den Herren, BWV 10, based on the German Magnificat. The musicologist Alberto Rizzuti compared the two settings which were possibly performed in one service on 2 July 1724.

For Visitation of 1733, Bach revised his Magnificat, creating the version better known today. In that version, transposed to D major, the laudes interpolations were abandoned. Limited differences in instrumentation include replacing the recorders by flutes and including these in the tutti movements. Changes in musical texture were even smaller, mellowing the harmony near the end of the Omnes generationes movement being the most noticeable.

Bach's son Carl Philipp Emanuel Bach followed the example of an extended setting, composing a Magnificat in nine movements in 1749, at the end of his father's life.

== Music ==
=== Scoring and structure ===
Bach scored the work festively. The autograph reads: "J.J. Magnificat à 3 Trombe Tamburi 2 Hautb. Basson. 2 Violini. Viola 5 Voci è Continuo", translating to: Jesu Juva ("Jesus, help!") / Magnificat for three trumpets, timpani, two oboes, bassoon, two violins, viola, five voices, continuo). The five voices are two sopranos (SI, SII), alto (A), tenor (T) and bass (B)). The instruments of the Baroque orchestra are listed in the first publication by Simrock in 1811 as "due violini, due oboe, tre trombi, tamburi, basson, viola e basso continuo", i.e. two violins, two oboes, three trumpets (in E♭), timpani (E♭ and B♭), bassoon, viola and basso continuo. Two recorders (flauto dolce) are required for aria No. 9 Esurientes.

=== Movements ===
Bach structured the text in eleven movements for the canticle (Luke 1:46–55), concluded by a twelfth doxology movement. Each verse of the canticle is assigned to one movement, except verse 48, beginning with a soprano solo in the role of Mary (third movement), then switching to the fourth movement sung by the chorus when "all generations" are mentioned. The structure, alternating choral and solo movements, is similar to "contemporary Italian concerted settings of the Magnificat". The four Christmas hymn movements are placed after the second, fifth, seventh and ninth movement on the Magnificat text.

Choral movements are evenly distributed in the structure, numbers 1, 4, 7, and 11 within the canticle, and the concluding doxology as movement 12. Choral movements 1, 7 and 12 are accompanied by the full orchestra (tutti), with the exceptions of the recorders which add specific colour only in movement 9. The movements for one to three solo voices are accompanied by an obbligato instrument or only strings or even only continuo, as in Bach's church cantatas. In two consecutive solo movements, the second one is often in richer scoring. The work contains, other than typical cantatas on Baroque poetry, no da capo arias. Similar to the first two Leipzig cantatas, BWV 75 and BWV 76, it is a complex structure of rather short movements.

The following table shows the title, voices and instruments, time, key and text sources for the twelve movements for Visitation and the inserted movements for Christmas. Note that the timpani are no wind instruments but always go with the trumpets. The basso continuo is not listed, playing almost throughout. The first Christmas chorale is a four-part setting with no continuo. In Suscepit Israel, the lowest line played by violins and viola in unison has been described as a bassett and an "unusual continuo". The last column, Dig, provides a link to the Bach Digital database, for more details such as scoring and the text. The Christmas interpolations are highlighted in colour, as are the choral movements, the movements with trumpets, and those movements of the canticle that are in major mode.

Movements of Bach's Magnificat in E♭ major (BWV 243a)
No.	Title	Voices	Winds	Strings	Key	Time	Text source	Dig
1	Magnificat anima mea	SSATB	3Tr Ti 2Ob	2Vl Va	E♭ major	3/4	Luke 1:46	
2	Et exultavit spiritus meus	SII		2Vl Va	E♭ major	3/8	Luke 1:47	
A	Vom Himmel hoch	SATB			E♭ major	cut time	Hymn by Martin Luther	
3	Quia respexit humiltatem	SI	Ob		C minor	common time	Luke 1:48 beginning	
4	Omnes generationes	SSATB	2Ob	2Vl Va	G minor	common time	Luke 1:48 end	
5	Quia fecit mihi magna	B			B♭ major	common time	Luke 1:49	
B	Freut euch und jubilieret	SSAT			B♭ major	common time	Verse by Sethus Calvisius	
6	Et misericordia	A T		2Vl Va	F minor	12/8	Luke 1:50	
7	Fecit potentiam	SSATB	3Tr Ti 2Ob	2Vl Va	E♭ major	common time	Luke 1:51	
C	Gloria in excelsis Deo	SSATB		Vl	E♭ major	common time	Luke 2:14	
8	Deposuit potentes	T		2Vl Va	G minor	3/4	Luke 1:52	
9	Esurientes	A	2Fl		F major	common time	Luke 1:53	
D	Virga Jesse floruit	S B			F major	12/8	fragment of a longer Christmas hymn	
10	Suscepit Israel	SSA	Tr	2Vl Va	C minor	common time	Luke 1:54	
11	Sicut locutus est	SSATB			E♭ major	common time	Luke 1:55	
12	Gloria Patri; Sicut erat in principio	SSATB	3Tr Ti 2Ob	2Vl Va	E♭ major	3/4	Doxology	

=== The twelve movements of the Magnificat canticle ===
==== 1 ====
The opening movement Magnificat anima mea (My soul magnifies the Lord) is performed by all voices and all instruments except the recorders. The instruments present the material with almost continuous runs in the upper parts, octaves and broken triads in the bass. The sopranos enter first, in third parallels: they sing the first word "Magnificat" (literally: makes great) with a melisma on the first syllable, ending in a figure like a trill, then a stressed dotted note on the stressed syllable "gni", and relaxing on "ficat". The motif is abbreviated to a "fanfare figure" of just four notes, a low upbeat followed by three same notes, with the first one dotted. The sopranos sing it twice, reaching first E♭, then G. The interplay of the fanfare and the melismas shapes the movement. One measure after the sopranos, alto and tenor begin to imitate the sopranos, another measure later, the bass adds the short motif as an octave up. The text remains Magnificat for most of the movement. After the voices conclude with "Dominum", the instruments close in a shortened version of their opening.

==== 2 ====
Et exultavit spiritus meus (And my spirit rejoices in God my Saviour) is an aria, as an image of personal celebration, sung by soprano II, accompanied by the strings. The major-mode and motifs of joy in the instruments illustrate the exultation. Et exultavit (And exults) begins with a broken upward triad followed by a rest, suggesting a minuet. spiritus meus (my spirit) is a sequence of 16th notes, two for every syllable. Longer melismas illustrate salutari (salvation).

A note in the autograph requests the insertion of the first Christmas interpolation here: "Alhier folget der Choral: Vom Himmel hoch, da kom ich her" (Here follows the chorale: Vom Himmel hoch, da kom ich her).

==== 3 ====
Quia respexit humilitatem (For He has regarded the lowliness [of His handmaiden.] is an aria sung by soprano I with an obbligato oboe. Looking at the humility, the aria contrast to the preceding one in slow movement and the minor mode. Hogwood writes: "Humility is a downwards gesture, and so everything takes a long, s-shaped movement downwards, with a little rise at the end", and comments that the use of limited resources of one wind instrument and the voice have "a subservient feel to it." Steinberg comments that voice and instrument first share the material in a "contemplative duet", but on ecce enim ex hoc beatam (Behold, from henceforth, I will be called blessed ) the voice changes to a "simpler, more declamatory style". "All the phrases turn upwards" in what Hogward describes as "an internalised dialogue", expecting that "nobody in the church would have been expecting the sudden burst of 'omnes'".

==== 4 ====
The continuation of the verse and completion of the sentence, Omnes generationes (by all generations) is given to the chorus, expressing the fullness of the praise. Hogwood compares the "crowd effect" to Bach's the crowds in Bach's Passions. The movement is a fugue which follows the stretto principle from the start and throughout. Beginning in measure 10, the voices enter, again half a measure apart, with the bass beginning. From measure 15, every entrance is one note higher, covering an octave as a symbol of completeness (omnes), again in the fast succession of half a measure: A, SII, SI, T, B, SII, SI, A. In a final sequence beginning in measure 21, the voices enter from bottom to top on the same note, only one beat apart. After a "very triumphal, but unfinished, chord" and a general pause, the movement concludes repeating the theme in homophony. Steinberg comments that Bach took the idea of separating the two words from the rest of the verse from earlier models, but filled it with an "exciting sense of drama" by the piled-up entrances in a "tremendous march across key after key", leading to "tense dissonances", finally a "dramatic pause" before the last statement.

==== 5 ====
Quia fecit mihi magna qui potens est (For the Mighty One has done great things for me) is an aria sung by the bass, accompanied only by the continuo. The motif, again beginning with repeated notes, is introduced by four measures of the continuo, then repeated by the voice. A ritornello is repeated throughout the movement, with a downward leap of a sixth and a downward scale of an octave which appears in the voice on the word "sanctum" (holy), in et sanctum nomen eius (and holy is His name). God's might shows in the bass voice and the dominant key of B♭ major.

A note in the autograph requests the insertion of the second Christmas interpolation here: "Hierauf folget Freut euch u. jubilirt" (Hereon follows Freut euch u. jubilirt).

==== 6 ====
Et misericordia a progenie in progenies, timentibus eum (His mercy is for those who fear Him from generation to generation) begins in great contrast softly with undulating movement in 12/8 time, played by the violins. It is a duet of alto and tenor, beginning in parallels of sixths and staying in homophony for most of the movement. The theme resembles the sarabande of Bach's first French Suite in D minor, BWV 812. Hogwood compares the music to the pastoral sinfonia beginning Part II of Bach's Christmas Oratorio, "creating a romantic, soft-edged, almost comforting sound". Jones remarks that timentibus eum" (who fear him) is "full of pathos and built over a partly chromatic, quasi-ostinato bass", while the "divine quality of mercy is expressed in beatific parallel thirds of the violins in the ritornello".

==== 7 ====
Fecit potentiam (He has shown strength) shares key, scoring and dotted motifs with the first movement. Based on a continuo line of octaves and repeated 16th notes, strength is expressed by irregular coloraturas in one voice and homophonic simultaneous calls of the other voices. The tenor begins the coloraturas of four measures, followed by alto, SII, bass and SI, leading to the climax of the movement, two homophonic calls. The new text, dispersit (He has scattered), appears in various voices as broken triads, juxtaposed to material from the first section, but then isolated, in a sequence from the highest voice to the lowest and in downward triads. Joes describes: "... the fugue is dispersed ('dispersit') in favour of a highly graphic, dramatic portrayal of the words 'He has scattered ...'". The conclusion, mente cordis sui (in the thoughts of their hearts), is marked Adagio and illustrates the text in pompous long chords, with accents in the trumpets. Hogwood notes that Bach shows "complete imagination" in "very strange, incomplete yet wonderful harmonies", the trumpet playing their highest available note as an image of "rich people's hearts, who have been misled by worldly promises".

A note in the autograph requests the insertion of the third Christmas interpolation here: "Hierher gehöret das Gloria in excelsis Deo" (Here belongs the Gloria in excelsis Deo).

==== 8 ====
Deposuit potentes (He has brought down the powerful) is an aria for tenor, accompanied by only the violins (and continuo) united in powerful unison. The instrumental ritornello of 14 measures presents the material. The first motif, later sung on "Deposuit", begins with a short upbeat and a long note, followed by a straight downward scale and a final leap up, while the continuo presents a broken triad, straight upward one octave. The second motif, later sung on "potentes", begins with an upbeat of three 16th, followed by a rhythmic pattern which expands both the lowest as the highest note, while the continuo moves in steady steps down. For the third motif, sung on "de sede" (from their thrones), the continuo picks up the rhythm of the second motif, while the violins play a more ornamented downward motion in sixteen continuous 16th. A fourth motif is a sequence of three measures, each a sequence of a figure of a figure of four 16th which is slowly moving upwards. When the singer takes over, the violins accent the end of each motif one to three by a broken downward triad.

The second thought of the verse, "et exaltavit humiles" (and lifted up the lowly), is sung without introduction as a melisma of four measures, which includes downward runs but in a steadily rising sequence and ending similarly to the sequence of motif four, on "exaltavit", but a modest downward line on "humiles" (the lowly). After a shorter ritornello, the tenor sings the complete text again, the first part in a slightly modified version, but the exaltation considerably expanded. Nonetheless, the ritornello in full length is repeated at the end.

==== 9 ====
Esurientes implevit bonis (He has filled the hungry with good things) is sung by the alto, accompanied by two recorders which may symbolise the need of the hungry. Bach used recorders also in his later cantata Brich dem Hungrigen dein Brot, BWV 39. They often play in parallels of sixths and thirds. The ritornello of eight measures introduces a motif moving up, on a continuo of steady quarter note, for four measures, later sung on Esurientes implevit bonis, while downward lines and a continuo moving in eighth notes later go with et divites dimisit (and sent the rich away empty). In Latin, the last word is inanes (empty), which Bach sometimes separates by rests. The continuo is plucked in "the emptiest sound", even on the last note, on which the recorders are silent.

A note in the autograph requests the insertion of the fourth Christmas interpolation here: "Hierauf folget Virga Jesse floruit" (Hereon follows Virga Jesse floruit).

==== 10 ====
Suscepit Israel puerum suum (He has helped His servant Israel) is scored for an unusual combination of the three highest voices, violins and violas in unison and trumpet. The text continues recordatus misericordiae suae (in remembrance of His mercy). The cantus firmus played by the trumpet is the melody of the traditional setting of Luther's German version of the Magnificat, a ninth psalm tone variant. The strings, as the only other instruments, play repeated notes in every measure, moving one step down or up in the next. The voices imitate each other, also in gentle movement, the first a fifth up in a long upbeat, the second a fifth down one measure later, the third up again, another measure later, described as "scale themes". In contrast, the second idea of the verse, recordatus, is on a "disjunct theme". Bach repeats the figure, with a downward quart on each syllable, in the Et incarnatus est of his Mass in B minor. It has been interpreted as a symbol of the cross, because a line drawn from the first to the fourth note crosses one from the second to the third. Jones assumes that the "bassett" of the unison strings symbolizes the divine quality of mercy.

==== 11 ====
Sicut locutus est ad patres nostros (According to the promise He made to our ancestors), the last line of the Magnificat canticle, is written in stile antico, the old style of the musical "fathers", as a strict fugue, one voice following the other as one generation follows the other. The theme has four distinctly different measures: the first repeated notes, the second flowing eighth notes, the third quarter notes in leaps, the fourth half notes leaping up a sixth. The countersubject has leaps down and up an octave in the second measure, the flowing eighth notes in the third measure. When the theme is developed the first time, four voices enter from bottom to top. In the second development, soprano I begins, followed by alto, tenor and bass. The movements ends with a more homophonic section in which the bass has the theme once more, while soprano I sings long suspended notes covering almost an octave down. Hogwood sees Bach alluding to his musical "forefathers": "He portrays, in a very square fugue, exactly how square he thought the forefathers of German music were. Four bars follows four bars, each voice coming in predictably and on time, all according to the rulebook, unimaginative and extremely dull!"

==== 12 ====
The work is concluded by the doxology, Gloria Patri (Glory to the Father), performed by the ensemble in two parts. The first part addresses the Trinity. Glory is given three times. Bach shapes the movement again as a "crowd" scene. Gloria is first presented as the major chord repeated three times, with a dotted note on the first syllable. In the second Gloria, leading to Patri, the voices sing the first syllable as an extended melisma in triplets, as another symbol of the Trinity, beginning in upward moving lines, for three measures in the basses, half a measure less for each following voice. In the third Gloria, leading to Filio (to the Son), in a similar pattern soprano I begins, followed by alto, soprano II, tenor and bass. In the fourth Gloria, leading to et Spiritui sancto (and to the Holy Spirit), in again similar pattern the voices follow each other from top to bottom, ending in a long cadenza.

The second part, Sicut erat in principio (as it was in the beginning) repeats material from the beginning of the work but shortened, as a frame. Jones points out that the "wittiness" of it was already used by Monteverdi.

Jones remarks that Bach observes a pattern of a bipartite structure of firstly contrasting homophonic blocks and "florid triplet rhythms", secondly "a lighter, quicker conclusion in triple time". He remarks that Bach used a similar pattern again the following year in the Sanctus for Christmas 1724 which later was included as the Sanctus of the Mass in B minor.

=== The four Christmas interpolations ===
The four hymns Bach inserted in the Magnificat for the Christmas vespers had a tradition in Leipzig. A setting by Bach's predecessor Kuhnau in a Christmas cantata is extant. They can be connected to scenic display of the Christmas story, representing the annunciation to the shepherds, first by one angel (A, B), then by the multitude (C), finally a cradle song (Kindleinwiegen, D). In Bach's autograph, the four movements are grouped at the back of the volume. They are written in older musical styles than most of the Magnificat movements.

==== A ====
Vom Himmel hoch, da komm ich her (From heaven on high I come here) is the first stanza of a hymn by Martin Luther, "Vom Himmel hoch, da komm ich her", a paraphrase of the Annunciation to the shepherds. It is set for four parts in E♭ major and alla-breve as an a cappella motet, with the soprano singing the melody in long notes, the lower voices in imitation of the motifs.

==== B ====
Freut euch und jubilieret (Rejoice and celebrate) is set for SSAT in B-flat major and common time. In polyphony on an independent basso continuo, with pairs of voices in parallels, it resembles a setting by Sethus Calvisius, a former Thomaskantor.

==== C ====
Gloria in excelsis Deo (Glory to God in the highest) is set for SSATB and violins in E♭ major, on the text from the Christmas story, the Annunciation to the Shepherds (Luke 2:14). It is written in "chordal fashion", a style found in Giacomo Carissimi, Johann Schelle (also a Thomaskantor) and Kuhnau, among others.

==== D ====
Virga Jesse floruit (The branch of Jesse flowered) is an "operatic" duet for soprano and bass in F major in 12/8 time. The text is part of a longer hymn, beginning like Virga Jesse floruit. Only the first 30 measures of this movement are extant. Bach used the music again in 1725 on a different text in his Christmas cantata Unser Mund sei voll Lachens, BWV 110, from which the missing part can be deducted. It was Alfred Dürr who noticed the similarity of the continuo parts of both pieces.

== Reception history ==
=== Publication ===
The earliest sources are autographs for the performances on 2 July and 25 December 1723, including the Christmas parts, kept by the Staatsbibliothek zu Berlin.

The score of the E♭ major version of Bach's Magnificat was first published by Simrock in 1811, edited by Georg Pölchau, however without the Christmas hymns. These were published in 1862, in the appendix of Volume 11/1 of the Bach-Gesellschaft Ausgabe, a publication that contained the D major version of the Magnificat (and not the E♭ major version).

The Neue Bach Ausgabe published the E♭ major version in 1955, edited by Alfred Dürr. Novello published an edition in 2000, edited by Neil Jenkins. Bärenreiter published a critical edition based on Dürr's 1955 edition again in 2014/15.

=== Recordings ===
Bach composed the work for five soloists: two sopranos, alto, tenor and bass. The soloists are listed in the table in the order SATB. For some recordings, only one soprano soloist is listed. Recordings with orchestras on period instruments in historically informed performances are highlighted. The first recordings in the 1960s combined the version in D major (BWV 243) with transposed Christmas interpolations. The type of orchestra is shown for an ensemble with period instruments in historically informed performance by green background.

Recordings of Magnificat with Christmas interpolations
Title	Conductor / Choir / Orchestra	Soloists	Label	Year	Orch. type
Magnificats / (D major version, BWV 243, with Christmas interpolations)	Helmuth Rilling Figuralchor der Gedächtniskirche Stuttgart Bach-Collegium Stuttgart	Romy Gundermann; Hildegard Rütgers; Kurt Equiluz; Erich Wenk	Turnabout Vox	1967	
Maderna Volume 8 - Desprez, J. S. Bach, G. Gabrieli-Maderna, Stravinkij	Bruno Maderna choir of Südwestdeutscher Rundfunk orchestra of Südwestdeutscher Rundfunk	Hedy Graf; Hildegard Laurich; Adalbert Kraus; Michael Schopper	Arkadia	1971 (rec.); 1991 (CD)	
Bach: Magnificat in D (Including Christmas Interpolations) (Magnificat in D, BWV 243, with Christmas Interpolations, BWV 243a)	Wolfgang Gönnenwein Süddeutscher Madrigalchor Deutsche Bachsolisten	Helen Donath; Gundula Bernàt-Klein; Birgit Finnilä; Peter Schreier; Barry McDaniel	Sine Qua Non	1975	
Edition Bachakademie Vol. 140	Helmuth Rilling Gächinger Kantorei Bach-Collegium Stuttgart	Sibylla Rubens; Ruth Sandhoff; Ingeborg Danz; Marcus Ullmann; Klaus Häger	Hänssler	2000	
J. S. Bach: Magnificat BWV in E flat major 243a - Cantata BWV 10	Roland Büchner Regensburger Domspatzen Musica Florea	Susanne Rydén; Heidrun Kordes; Drew Minter; Markus Brutscher; Peter Harvey	Pure Classics – Glissando	2000	
Magnificat zur Weihnachtsvesper BWV 243a	Rolf Schweizer Motettenchor Pforzheim L'arpa festante	Susanna Cornelius; Claudia Darius; Hans Jörg Mammel; Matthias Horn	Amati	2000	Period
J. S. Bach: Magnificat (with cantata BWV 63) Leipziger Weihnachtskantaten (2CD-set also containing cantatas BWV 91, 121, and 133)	Philippe Herreweghe Collegium Vocale Gent	Dorothée Blotzky-Mields; Carolyn Sampson; Ingeborg Danz; Mark Padmore; Sebastian Noack	Harmonia Mundi	2002 (rec.); 2003 (CD)	Period
Bach - Kuhnau: Magnificat	Ton Koopman Amsterdam Baroque Orchestra & Choir	Deborah York; Orlanda Velez Isidro; Bogna Bartosz; Jörg Dürmüller; Klaus Mertens	Naxos	2003 (rec.); 2004 (DVD)	Period
A. Lotti: Missa Sapientiae / J. S. Bach: Magnificat BWV 243a	Thomas Hengelbrock Balthasar-Neumann-Chor Balthasar-Neumann-Ensemble	Dorothee Mields; Constanze Backes; Bernhard Landauer; Jürgen Banholzer; Hermann Oswald; Wolf Matthias Friedrich	Deutsche Harmonia Mundi	2008	Period

The first recording by Rilling, of the D major version with Christmas interpolations, with a performance time of 40:06, was reissued under the title Christmas Magnificats, and also issued in comparison to a recording of the Magnificat in D by Kurt Thomas under the title Compare. Gönnenwein's D major recording with Christmas interpolations appeared on a CD titled J. S. Bach: Cantatas 142, 65 & Magnificat.

The Leipziger Weihnachtskantaten recording by the Collegium Vocale Gent, conducted by Philippe Herreweghe, was reviewed as with "bracing but not rushed tempos, infectiously energetic and technically solid contributions from the chorus, and an intelligently paced flow from movement to movement." The Guardian wrote: "Herreweghe's accounts are typically thoughtful, not at all theatrical or dramatically driven, and that slightly laid-back approach takes the edge off the Magnificat too, though the quality of the solo and choral singing, and the careful shaping of the orchestral lines are all exemplary."

In 2015 John Butt and the Dunedin Consort released a recording of the E♭ major version in the context of a reconstructed Christmas service as it might have been heard in Leipzig in 1723. The recording includes organ music and congregational hymn singing.

== Sources ==
Scores

- "Magnificat E-flat major and Christmas hymns". Berlin: Staatsbibliothek zu Berlin – Preußischer Kulturbesitz. 1723.
- "Magnificat in E flat major [first version] BWV 243.1; BWV 243a; BC E 13 / Magnificat (The Visitation of Mary [2 July])". Bach Digital. (Note: Virga Jesse incomplete)
- Pölchau, Georg, ed. (1811). Magnificat à cinque voci, due violini, due oboe, tre trombi, tamburi, basson, viola e basso continuo. Bonn: N. Simrock. OCLC 68145446.
- Rust, Wilhelm, ed. (1862). Von Himmel hoch (SATB) / Freut euch und jubiliert (SSAT, continuo) / Gloria (SSATB with colla parte instruments & violino obligato) / Virga Jesse (fragment – S, B, continuo). Leipzig: Breitkopf & Härtel (Bach-Gesellschaft).
- (1955) Neue Ausgabe sämtlicher Werke, Series 2: Messen, Passionen und oratorische Werke, Volume 3: Magnificat: erste Fassung in Es-Dur BWV 243a, zweite Fassung in D-Dur BWV 243, edited by Alfred Dürr. Kassel, Bärenreiter, 1955.
- (1959) Magnificat Es-dur: Herausgegeben von Alfred Dürr, Taschenpartituren No. 58. Bärenreiter, 1959.
- Jenkins, Neil (2000). "Bach Magnificat in D & E flat BWV 243 & 243a / (Novello edition ed. N. Jenkins)" (PDF). neiljenkins.info/. pp. 1–6.
- (2014) "Magnificat Es-Dur BWV 243a (mit den vier Einlagesätzen: Vom Himmel hoch / Freut euch und jubilieret / Gloria in excelsis / Virga Jesse floruit). Für Soli (SSATB), Chor (SSATB), Orchester und Orgel (lat). Nach dem Urtext der Neuen Bach-Ausgabe. Ed. A. Dürr" (PDF) (in German). Bärenreiter. 2014. p. 3. Archived from the original (PDF) on 15 October 2014.

Books

- Butler, Gregory (2008). J. S. Bach's Concerted Ensemble Music, the Concerto (in Bach perspectives). Vol. 7. University of Illinois Press. p. 53. ISBN 0-252-03165-2.
- Cantagrel, Gilles (2011). J.-S. Bach : Passions, messes, motets (in French). Fayard. p. 260. ISBN 978-2-213-66547-4.
- Glöckner, Andreas (2003). Bachs Es-Dur-Magnificat BWV 243a – eine genuine Weihnachtsmusik? (in German). Vol. 89. Bach-Jahrbuch. pp. 37–45. Archived from the original on 2019-06-02.
- Jones, Richard D. P. (2013). The Creative Development of Johann Sebastian Bach, Volume II: 1717–1750: Music to Delight the Spirit. Oxford University Press. ISBN 978-0-19-969628-4.
- Schröder, Dorothea (2012). Johann Sebastian Bach. C.H. Beck. ISBN 978-0-19-969628-4.
- Schweitzer, Albert (1911). The Magnificat and the St. John, Chapter XXVI of J. S. Bach. Breitkopf & Härtel, Reprint: Dover, 1966. ISBN 0-486-21632-2.
- Spitta, Philipp (1899). Johann Sebastian Bach: his work and influence on the music of Germany, 1685–1750. Vol. 2. Novello. pp. 369–371.
- Steinberg, Michael (2005). Choral Masterworks: A Listener's Guide. Oxford University Press. pp. 31–34. ISBN 0-19-802921-7.
- Wolff, Christoph (1991). Bach: Essays on His Life and Music. Harvard University Press. ISBN 978-0-674-05926-9.
- Zenck, Martin (1986). Die Bach-Rezeption des späten Beethoven: zum Verhältnis von Musikhistoriographie und Rezeptionsgeschichtsschreibung der 'Klassik' (supplement to the Archiv für Musikwissenschaft) (in German). Franz Steiner Verlag. p. 234. ISBN 978-3-515-03312-1.

Online sources

- "Carl Philipp Emanuel Bach / Magnificat / BR-CPEB E 4 (Wq 215), 1749". Carus-Verlag.
- Dellal, Pamela (2021). "BWV 243a – "Magnificat" (E-flat Major)". pameladellal.com.
- Grob, Jochen (2014). "BWV 243a, Magnificat Es-Dur / BC E 13" (in German). s-line.de. Archived from the original on 21 July 2015.
- Hogwood, Christopher (2011). "Keep it Short: J S Bach Magnificat". Gresham College.
- Oron, Aryeh (2013). "Magnificat in E flat major BWV 243a / Recordings". Bach Cantatas Website.
- "Magnificat BWV 243a / Conducted by Thomas Hengelbrock". Bach Cantatas Website. 2000.
- Prinz (2013). "Johann Sebastian und Carl Philipp Emanuel Bach / Magnificat-Vertonungen" (PDF). Archived from the original (PDF) on 10 December 2014.
- Rizzuti, Alberto (2013). "One Verse, Two Settings, and Three Strange Youths". ojs.unito.it.
- Vernier, David. "J. S. Bach: Leipzig Christmas cantatas; Magnificat/Herreweghe". classicstoday.com.
- Wolff, Christoph (1998). "From konzertmeister to thomaskantor: Bach's cantata production 1713–1723" (PDF). Bach Cantatas Website.
- Bach, Johann Sebastian. "Brich dem Hungrigen dein Brot BWV 39; BC A 96 / Cantata". Bach Digital. 1967.
- "Bach: Magnificat - Buxtehude: Magnificat anima mea. (Sleeve)". Amazon.
- "Bach: Magnificat, Kurt Thomas vs. Helmuth Rilling (Compare 2 Versions)". Amazon.
