= Magnificat (Bach) =

Musical composition by Johann Sebastian Bach

- BWV 243.2
- by J. S. Bach
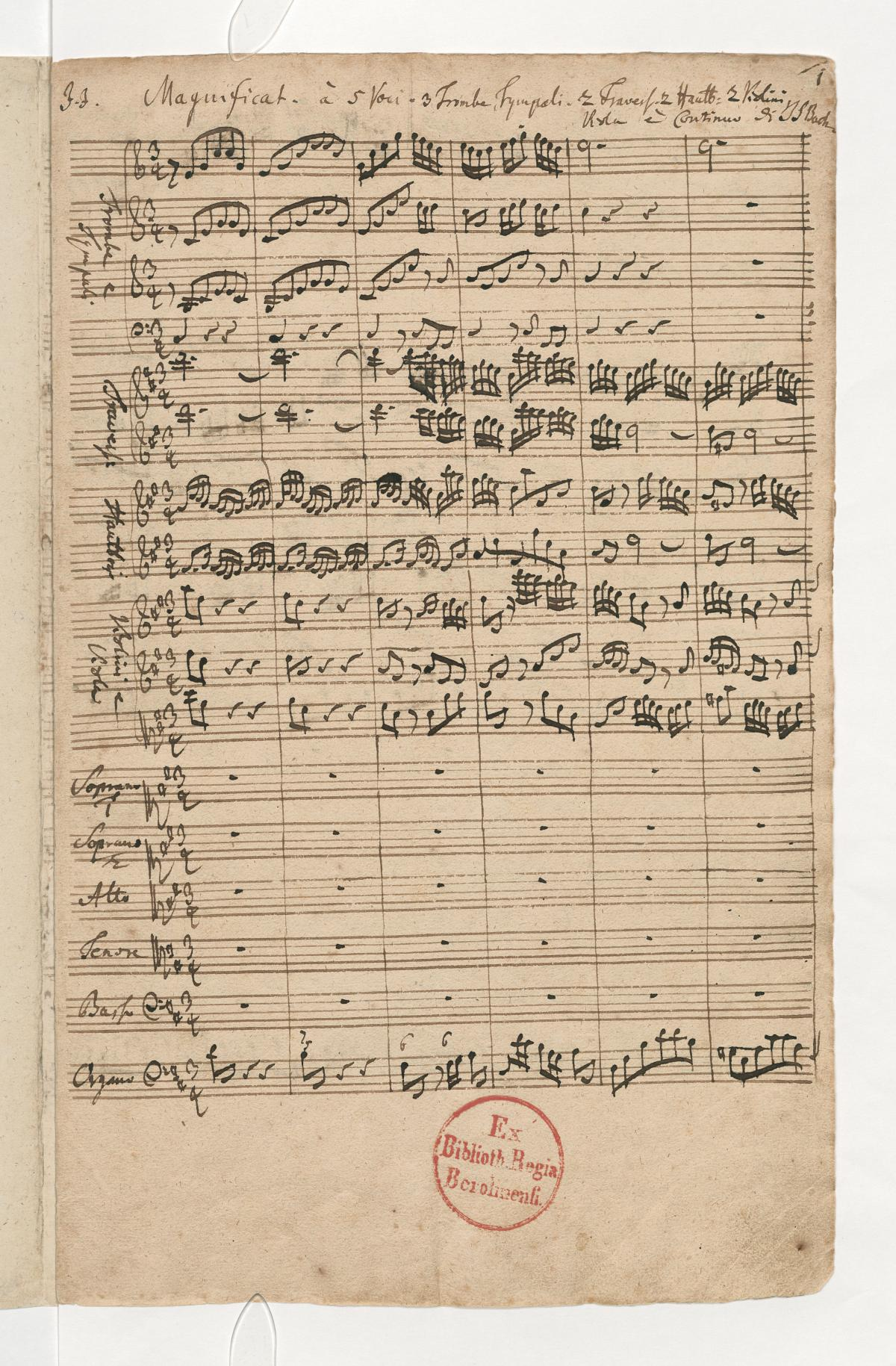
- First page of Bach's autograph score
- Key: D major
- Related: BWV 243.1 (1723)
- Occasion: Lutheran vespers on feast day
- Text: Luke 1:46–55; doxology
- Language: Latin
- Performed: Leipzig, c. 1733
- Movements: 12
- Vocal: SSATB choir and solo
- Instrumental: 3 trumpets; timpani; 2 traversos; 2 oboes; 2 oboes d'amore; strings; continuo

Johann Sebastian Bach's Magnificat, BWV 243, is a musical setting of the biblical canticle Magnificat. It is scored for five vocal parts (two sopranos, alto, tenor and bass), and a Baroque orchestra including trumpets and timpani. It is the first major liturgical composition on a Latin text by Bach.

In 1723, after taking up his post as Thomaskantor in Leipzig, Bach set the text of the Magnificat in a twelve movement composition in the key of E♭ major. For a performance at Christmas he inserted four hymns (laudes) related to that feast. This version, including the Christmas interpolations, was given the number 243.1 (previously 243a) in the catalogue of Bach's works.

Likely for the feast of Visitation of 1733, or another feast in or around that year, Bach produced a new version of his Latin Magnificat, without the Christmas hymns: instrumentation of some movements was altered or expanded, and the key changed from E♭ major to D major, for performance reasons of the trumpet parts. This version of Bach's Magnificat is known as BWV 243.2 (previously BWV 243).

After publication of both versions in the 19th century, the second became the standard for performance. It is one of Bach's most popular vocal works.

== History ==
In Leipzig, the Magnificat was regularly part of Sunday services, sung in German on ordinary Sundays but more elaborately and in Latin on the high holidays (Christmas, Easter and Pentecost) and on the three Marian feasts Annunciation, Visitation and Purification.

=== Bach's tenure as Thomaskantor in Leipzig ===
Apart from an early setting of the Kyrie, on a mixed Greek and German text (BWV 233a), all of Bach's known liturgical compositions in Latin were composed during his tenure as Thomaskantor in Leipzig, from 1723 until his death in 1750. Compared to Lutheran practice elsewhere, an uncharacteristic amount of Latin was used in church services in Leipzig. An early account of Bach showing interest in liturgical practices in Leipzig dates from 1714, when he noted down the order of the service on the first Sunday in Advent during a visit to the town. At the time Johann Kuhnau was the Cantor in Leipzig. When Kuhnau died in 1722, one of the candidates applying for the post of Thomaskantor was Christoph Graupner, a former pupil of Kuhnau, who reused a Magnificat he had composed for Christmas 1722 as an audition piece in January 1723, three weeks before Bach presented his audition cantatas Jesus nahm zu sich die Zwölfe, BWV 22 and Du wahrer Gott und Davids Sohn, BWV 23. Bach assumed the position of Thomaskantor on 30 May 1723, the first Sunday after Trinity, performing an ambitious cantata in 14 movements, Die Elenden sollen essen, BWV 75, followed by a comparable cantata, Die Himmel erzählen die Ehre Gottes, BWV 76 the next Sunday.

=== Traditional setting of the German Magnificat ===
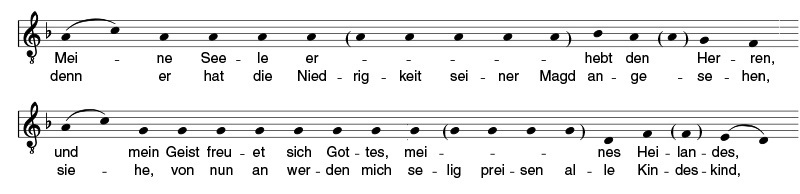
Traditional D minor setting of Luther's German Magnificat, which is a particular German version of the ninth tone or tonus peregrinus

The traditional setting of Luther's German translation of the Magnificat ("Meine Seele erhebt den Herren") is a German variant of the tonus peregrinus, a rather exceptional psalm tone in Gregorian chant. The tonus peregrinus (or ninth tone) is associated with the ninth mode or Aeolian mode. For the traditional setting of Luther's German Magnificat that is the minor mode for which the last note of the melodic formula is the tonic, a fifth below its opening note.

The tonus peregrinus variant that is associated with Luther's German Magnificat appears in compositions by, among others, Johann Hermann Schein, Heinrich Schütz, Johann Pachelbel and Dietrich Buxtehude. Bach uses the melodic formula as an instrumental cantus firmus in movement 10 (Suscepit Israel) of his Latin Magnificat. He uses it again in his "German Magnificat", i.e. the cantata Meine Seel erhebt den Herren BWV 10 composed for Visitation of 1724, in the chorale harmonisations BWV 323 and 324, and in the fourth Schübler Chorale BWV 648. Also in BWV 733, Fuga sopra il Magnificat, the melodic formula is used as a theme: this chorale prelude may however be the work of Bach pupil Johann Ludwig Krebs.

=== Extended settings of the Magnificat ===
Being a quintessential part of vespers, evensong or matins, the Magnificat was, already for over a century before Bach's composition, the liturgical text that was most often set to music apart from the Mass ordinary. In Protestantism there was no Latin text more often set to music than the Magnificat. Also settings of the German text of the Magnificat were current from the early 17th century, without one form suppressing the other.

Extended settings of the Magnificat, also indicated as settings in a concertato sectional construction, that is in several movements with chorus, orchestra and vocal soloists, and a non-linear treatment of the text (parts of the text repeated multiple times by the singers), go back to the old Italian school of music. Such an example can be found in Claudio Monteverdi's Magnificat a 7 voci, one of two alternative Magnificat settings included in his Vespro della Beata Vergine. In a Lutheran tradition there is for example Schütz' Latin Magnificat, SWV 468. Magnificat composers like Johann Levini, Antonio Lotti and Francesco Durante are cited as possible inspirations for Bach. Around Bach's time there are also examples by Heinichen and by Vivaldi.

In many of these settings a single verse of the Magnificat can be sung by one or more soloists alternating with choral singing, as Bach does in his treatment of the third Magnificat verse: the soprano sings the first words of the verse, while the chorus concludes it. This particular split of the third verse, leaving only the last two words (omnes generationes) to the chorus, had been practised before by Ruggiero Fedeli, and in a Magnificat in G minor from 1720 which Bach probably knew (that Magnificat in G minor used to be attributed to Tomaso Albinoni). Also Graupner's 1722 Magnificat had this split.

Another characteristic of Bach's Magnificat is that it is set for a five-part chorus. Extending a standard SATB choir with more voice parts was however no novelty for Magnificat compositions: for example Johann Pachelbel, the teacher of Johann Sebastian's eldest brother, had composed half a dozen Magnificats for SSATB choir, and one for soli, SSATB double choir and orchestra. Kuhnau's Magnificat setting also used a SSATB choir. Bach had already composed for a SSATB choir in Weimar (Der Himmel lacht! Die Erde jubilieret, BWV 31, an Easter cantata from 1715). He did the same in his funeral motet Jesu, meine Freude. Around the time when the D major version of the Magnificat originated, he composed for the same extended chorus in his Mass for the Dresden court. Other extended choral settings by Bach include his Sanctus for six vocal parts (SSSATB) for Christmas 1724, and compositions for double choir like the St Matthew Passion (1727) and the secular cantata Preise dein Glücke, gesegnetes Sachsen, BWV 215 (1734). Such compositions with an extended choir are however outside Bach's usual routine for liturgical music.

Bach was not the first to include mixed German/Latin Christmas interpolations in a Magnificat sung in Latin: Hieronymus Praetorius published a Magnificat with such interpolations in 1622. Samuel Scheidt's Geistliche Konzerte III (1635) contained three Magnificats with interpolations, the first of these (SSWV 299 for SSATTB and basso continuo) with the first stanza of "Vom Himmel hoch da komm ich her" as first interpolation.

=== The Visitation version(s) ===
In the Gospel of Luke the words of the Magnificat are spoken by Mary when she visits her cousin Elizabeth, both being pregnant, Mary with Jesus and Elizabeth with John the Baptist. In Christianity, the feast commemorating that visit is called Visitation. It is a chosen opportunity to give more than ordinary attention to the Magnificat canticle in liturgy, while the feast celebrates the event tied to its origin.

In Bach's time the feast day of Visitation fell on 2 July. The D major version of Bach's Magnificat (BWV 243.2) may have been performed on 2 July 1733, as part of the church service in the St. Thomas Church (Thomaskirche) in Leipzig. That year there had been a period of mourning after the death of the sovereign, Augustus the Strong. During that mourning period, which ran from Sexagesima Sunday (15 February) to the fourth Sunday after Trinity (28 June), no concerted music was allowed in the churches. During that period Bach had been composing a Kyrie-Gloria mass in B minor which he dedicated to the successor, Frederick Augustus II, in a letter signed 27 July 1733.

The first occasion after the mourning period that re-allowed concerted church music was the feast of Visitation, Thursday 2 July 1733. It is possible that Bach produced his new version of the Magnificat for this occasion, although Christmas of the same year as first performance date for the new version is possible too: it can not be determined with certainty on which day around 1732–1735 the D major version of the Magnificat was first performed, and until when Bach amended the score to its final state. Around 1733 Bach filed two cantatas by Gottfried Heinrich Stölzel, for the fifth and the sixth Sunday after Trinity (5 and 12 July in 1733): Bach may have relied on church music by other composers for the services in Leipzig in July 1733, while composing and copying out the performance parts of the extensive first part of the Mass in B minor.

Magnificat
- BWV 243.1
- by J. S. Bach
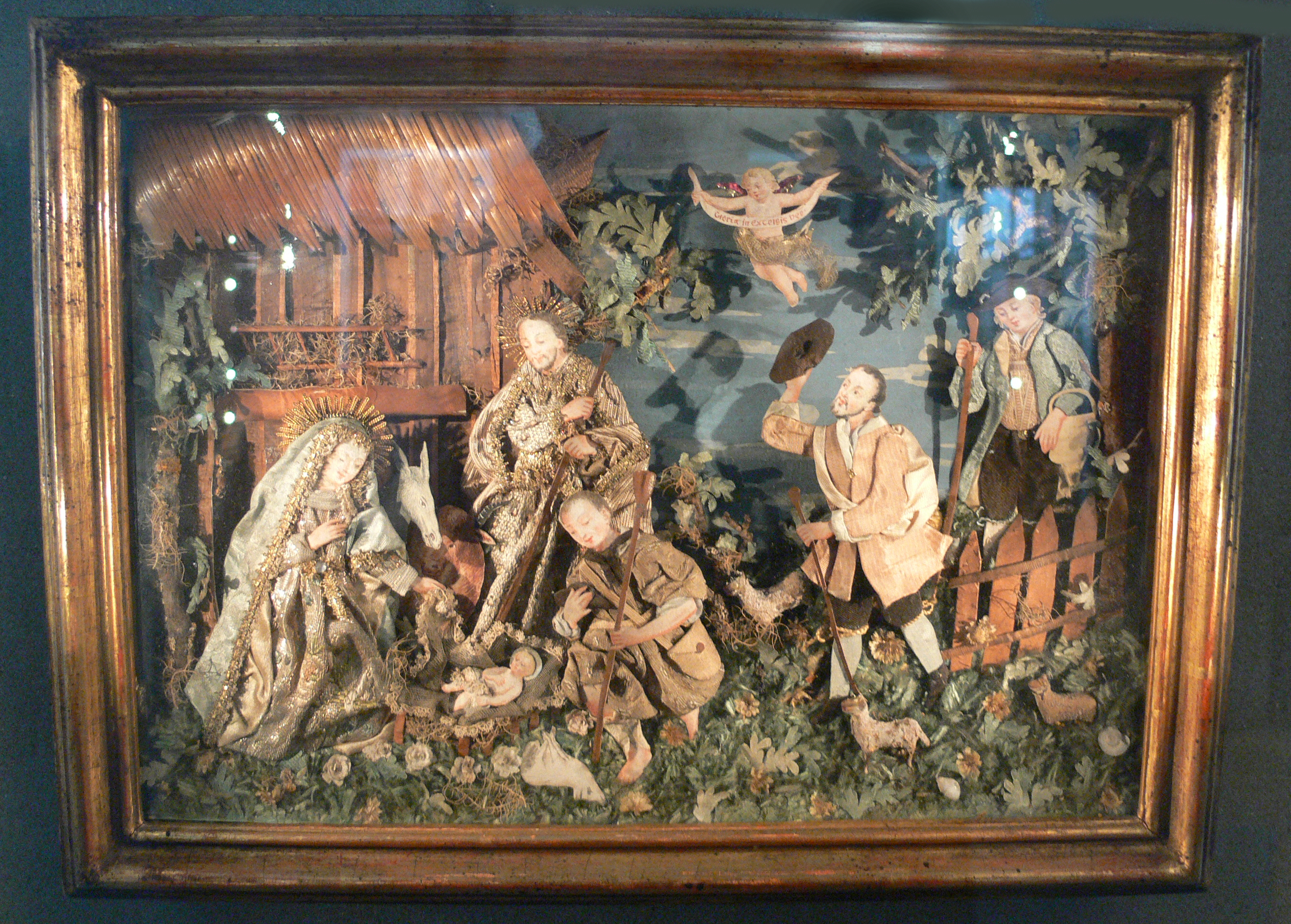
- Adoration of the Shepherds, Augsburg, around 1730
- Key: E♭ major
- Related: BWV 243.2 (c. 1733)
- Occasion: Lutheran vespers on feast day
- Text: Luke 1:46–55; doxology; Christmas interpolations: traditional German/Latin texts
- Language: Latin; German
- Performed: Leipzig, 1723
- Movements: 12 (+ 4 for Christmas)
- Vocal: SSATB choir and solo
- Instrumental: 3 trumpets; timpani; 2 recorders; 2 oboes; strings; continuo

In 2003 Bach scholar Andreas Glöckner argued that the very first version of Bach's Magnificat, that is the E♭ major version before the four Christmas interpolations were added to the autograph, was first performed on 2 July 1723. That would have been exactly ten years before the transposed version, and composed for the same Marian feast. Bach had taken up his post as Thomaskantor in Leipzig on 30 May, the first Sunday after Trinity in 1723. Visitation was the first feast day of his tenure, which called for exceptionally festive music.

=== The Christmas interpolations ===
Before Glöckner's 2003 article on the origin of the Magnificat, and for some authors still after that, it was generally assumed that Bach had composed his Magnificat in the quiet time of Advent 1723 for a first performance at the Christmas vespers. For that performance Bach composed four laudes, songs of praise partly in German, partly in Latin to be inserted at certain points in the E♭ major version of the Magnificat. The E♭ major version of the Magnificat including these interpolations is known as BWV 243.1 (previously BWV 243a).

The text of these laudes had been used in Leipzig in a Christmas cantata by Bach's predecessor Kuhnau. Possibly those settings in C major of the same four texts as the laudes Bach had included in his Christmas Magnificat were not a self-contained cantata, but laudes Kuhnau had composed for insertion in his C major Magnificat when it was to be performed at Christmas. These laudes illustrate what the Gospels describe as the circumstances around Christ's birth, and were embedded in an old tradition named Kindleinwiegen (rocking of the cradle).

As these laudes were to be performed with a very limited accompaniment of instruments, they were supposedly performed from the small loft in the high choir of the Thomaskirche, opposite to the large organ loft where the other movements of the Magnificat were performed. The autograph of the E♭ major version of the Magnificat (BWV 243.1) suggests that Bach intended to perform the first version of his Magnificat also without the laudes, depending on circumstances, for example on other feasts than Christmas.

=== Other Magnificats by Bach? ===
Bach's Nekrolog, the 1754 obituary written by Johann Friedrich Agricola and the composer's son Carl Philipp Emanuel, mentions that the composer wrote several Magnificats. Apart from the extant copies of the Latin Magnificat BWV 243, of the German Magnificat BWV 10 and of the chorale harmonisation BWV 324, a Magnificat for soprano solo was considered lost in the 19th century. The score of that so-called "little" Magnificat (Kleine Magnificat) was rediscovered in the 20th century, and listed as BWV Anh. 21; however, its authenticity was doubted. In 1982 Melchior Hoffmann was identified as the composer of this German Magnificat Meine Seel erhebt den Herren. A similar cantata on a German paraphrase of the Magnificat, Meine Seele rühmt und preist, BWV 189 for tenor solo and composed for Visitation, has also been attributed to Hoffmann.

Another German libretto paraphrasing the Magnificat, published by Picander in his 1728–29 cantata cycle for performance on 2 July 1728, may have been set by Bach. Similarly, a Meine Seele erhebet den Herrn cantata by an unknown librettist for Visitation 1725. Further, Bach copied Latin Magnificats by other composers:

- in the early 1740s Bach copied Antonio Caldara's Magnificat in C major, arranging its Suscepit Israel movement (BWV 1082).
- BWV Anh. 30 is a Magnificat in C major for double SATB choir and orchestra, copied by Bach around 1742. The manuscript score indicates no composer, but in 2012 it was discovered that it is Bach's arrangement (by adding parts for timpani and for a third trumpet) of a late 17th-century composition by Pietro Torri. An earlier attribution of the work had been to Antonio Lotti.

== Structure and movements ==
Bach's Magnificat consists of eleven movements for the text of Luke 1:46–55, concluded by a twelfth doxology movement. Each verse of the canticle is assigned to one movement, except verse 48 (the third verse of the Magnificat) which begins with a soprano solo in the third movement and is concluded by the chorus in the fourth movement. The traditional division of the Magnificat, as used by composers since the late Middle Ages, was in 12 verses: it differs from Bach's 12 movements in that Luke's verse 48 is one verse in the traditional division, while the doxology is divided into two verses.

| Traditional verse division | | Text source | Bach's Magnificat |
|---|---|---|---|
| 1. | Magnificat anima mea Dominum. | Luke 1:46 | movement 1 |
| 2. | Et exultavit spiritus meus in Deo salutari meo. | Luke 1:47 | movement 2 |
| 3. | Quia respexit humilitatem ancillae suae ecce enim ex hoc beatam me dicent omnes generationes. | Luke 1:48 | movement 3 and 4 |
| 4. | Quia fecit mihi magna qui potens est et sanctum nomen ejus. | Luke 1:49 | movement 5 |
| 5. | Et misericordia ejus a progenie in progenies timentibus eum. | Luke 1:50 | movement 6 |
| 6. | Fecit potentiam in brachio suo dispersit superbos mente cordis sui. | Luke 1:51 | movement 7 |
| 7. | Deposuit potentes de sede et exaltavit humiles. | Luke 1:52 | movement 8 |
| 8. | Esurientes implevit bonis et divites dimisit inanes. | Luke 1:53 | movement 9 |
| 9. | Suscepit Israel puerum suum recordatus misericordiae suae. | Luke 1:54 | movement 10 |
| 10. | Sicut locutus est ad patres nostros Abraham et semini ejus in saecula. | Luke 1:55 | movement 11 |
| 11. | Gloria Patri, et Filio et Spiritui Sancto. | Doxology | movement 12, time part |
| 12. | Sicut erat in principio, et nunc, et semper et in saecula saeculorum. Amen. | Doxology | movement 12, 3/4 time part |

There is however no numbering of movements in Bach's autographs, nor is there a caesura between the third and the fourth movement: the 25th measure of the Quia respexit (where the soprano soloist sings their last note) is the first measure of the Omnes generationes movement. The four Christmas interpolations are placed after the second, the fifth, the seventh and the ninth movement on the Magnificat text. These four laudes movements are usually indicated by the letters A to D, with these text sources:

- A: Hymn by Martin Luther
- B: Verse attributed to Sethus Calvisius
- C: Luke 2:14
- D: Fragment of a Christmas hymn

Performance time of the Magnificat lies typically between 25 and 30 minutes, with an additional five minutes for the Christmas interpolations. The duration of the version without Christmas hymns is comparable with that of an average Bach cantata. However, there are many differences: the Magnificat contains about twice as many movements as an average cantata, keeping it short by avoiding da capos in the arias, and altogether no recitatives. Also the text is in Latin (not the usual language for a Bach cantata), the architecture of the movements is fairly complex, as opposed to the fairly simple structure of an average cantata, and the choral writing is in five parts, "outside the normal routine of Bach's sacred vocal works".

=== Scoring and key signature ===
The movements 1 (Magnificat), 7 (Fecit potentiam) and 12 (Gloria patri) are the cornerstones of the composition: they are in the tonic key (E♭ major for BWV 243.1, D major for BWV 243.2), and are the only movements that feature a five-part chorus as well as a tutti orchestra. The chorus also sings in movement 4 (Omnes generationes), accompanied by an orchestra without trumpets and timpani, and in movement 11 (Sicut locutus est), there only accompanied by the continuo. The first three choral movements are, in the version without the Christmas hymns, followed by two movements for a vocal soloist, the second one often with richer scoring. In the movements for vocal soloists the instrumentation is as usual in Bach's cantata's: the soloists are accompanied by an obbligato instrument, only strings and/or continuo. Movement A (Vom Himmel hoch) is the only a cappella movement.

As natural trumpets were usually tuned in D in Saxony, this is given as a reason why Bach transposed the initial E♭ major version to D major.

==== Voices ====
Bach set the Magnificat for SSATB choir and soloists. In movement 10 (Suscepit Israel) both sopranos sing together with the alto.

==== Orchestra ====
The Baroque orchestra for BWV 243.1 consists of "due violini, due oboe, tre trombi, tamburi, basson, viola e basso continuo", i.e. two violins (Vl), two oboes (Ob), three trumpets (Tr, tonic), timpani (Ti, tonic and dominant), bassoon, viola (Va) and basso continuo (Bc). Two recorders (flauto dolce, Fl) are required for aria No. 9 Esurientes, but are not part of the tutti.

For the 1733 version, Bach used a somewhat more extended orchestra: the recorders are replaced by traversos (Fl) and they get separate parts in all four choral movements. In movements three and four the oboes are replaced by oboes d'amore (Oa). In the 10th movement (Suscepit Israel) the oboes replace the trumpet for the obbligato instrumental part.

The continuo part is played by organ, bassoon, cello and violone in most movements. In the 1723 version movement 10 (Suscepit Israel) has a bassett (Ba) part played exclusively by violins and viola in unisono. In the 1733 version this continuo line is given to a continuo that includes cello, but not bassoon and violone.

=== Symmetrical structure ===
Bach's Magnificat is built symmetrically around the 7th movement (Fecit potentiam): Between the first and the 7th movement there are four verses of the Magnificat, between the 7th and the last there are also four. First, seventh and last movement are in the tonic key, with full orchestra and choir. The second and 11th movement are in the same major key, the third and the 10th movement are in the relative minor key. The movement preceding, and the one following, the central 7th movement are also in a minor key. The fifth and the ninth are in a major key, different from the tonic. The Christmas additions are separated by two Magnificat verses, the first addition being after the second verse. The Christmas hymns are always in the same key as the preceding movement. By verse, this is what the harmonic structure looks like:

- Verse 1 and 2 (movements 1 and 2, followed by movement A in the Christmas version): tonic key (major)
  - Verse 3: starts in relative minor key (movement 3), moving to another minor key (movement 4)
    - Verse 4 (movement 5, followed by movement B in the Christmas version): major key different from tonic
      - Verse 5 (movement 6): minor key
        - Verse 6 (movement 7, followed by movement C in the Christmas version): tonic key
      - Verse 7 (movement 8): minor key
    - Verse 8 (movement 9, followed by movement D in the Christmas version): major key different from tonic
  - Verse 9 (movement 10): relative minor key
- Verse 10 and doxology (movements 11 and 12): tonic key

Regarding voices and orchestration the four Magnificat verses between the first and the seventh movement, and those between the seventh and the last, have a less symmetrical build-up: here the idea is rather that after a tutti movement there are two or three arias building up to the next choral movement:

- movements two and three, both for solo soprano, build up to the Omnes generationes choral movement No. 4
- movements five (solo) and six (duet), build up to the 7th tutti movement
- movements eight and nine (both solo movements), followed by an aria for vocal trio, build up to the final two choral movements

The last aria in each of these sets of arias is first a solo, then a duet, then a terzet (trio). When inserting the Christmas hymns, building up to the seventh movement alternates arias with choral movements, while in the second half of the composition the choral movements at the outer ends are separated by a set of four arias: solo → solo → duet → trio. In such sixteen-movement performance there is however another symmetry: the third section (movement A), and the third counting down from the last (movement 10) both use a Lutheran chorale melody as cantus firmus: soprano voices in the first case ("Vom Himmel hoch, da komm ich her"), instrumental in the second ("Meine Seele erhebt den Herren"). The symmetry of the Christmas version can be pictured as follows:

"Vom Himmel hoch da komm' ich her", the melody of the cantus firmus of the "A" Christmas interpolation

- Two movements (1, 2) in tonic key → "cantus firmus" movement (A)
  - Verse in minor key (mvt. 3, 4) → two movements in the same major key (5, B)
    - Verse in minor key (mvt. 6) → two movements in tonic key (7, C)
  - Verse in minor key (mvt. 8) → two movements in the same major key (9, D)
- Two movements in tonic key (11, 12) ← "cantus firmus" movement (10)

This is also 5 times two verses of the Magnificat followed by a movement with a text that comes from elsewhere, the only bible quote of these other texts (movement C, also a doxology like the last movement) being coupled with the central 7th movement.

| Magnificat by Johann Sebastian Bach | | | BWV 243.1 (243a) Christmas 1723 version | | | BWV 243.2 (243) Visitation 1733 version | | |
| No. and title | Time | Voices | Instruments | Key | Autogr. p. | Instruments | Key | Autogr. p. |
|---|---|---|---|---|---|---|---|---|
| 1. Magnificat | 3/4 | SSATB | tutti | E♭ | 1–9 | tutti | D | 1–15 |
| 2. Et exultavit | 3/8 | sII | 2Vl Va Bc | E♭ | 3–7 | 2Vl Va Bc | D | 16–18 |
| A. Vom Himmel hoch | cut time | SATB | | E♭ | 23, 25–27 | | | |
| 3. Quia respexit | common time | sI | Ob Bc | c | 8–9 | OaI Bc | b | 18–19 |
| 4. Omnes generationes | common time | SSATB | 2Ob 2Vl Va Bc | g | 10–12 | 2Fl 2Oa 2Vl Va Bc | f♯ | 20–25 |
| 5. Quia fecit | common time | b | Bc | B♭ | 12–13 | Bc | A | 20–23 |
| B. Freut euch und jubiliert | common time | SSAT | Bc | B♭ | 28–30 | | | |
| 6. Et misericordia | 12/8 | a t | 2Vl Va Bc | f | 13–15 | 2Fl 2Vl Va Bc | e | 24–28 |
| 7. Fecit potentiam | common time | SSATB | tutti | E♭ | 15–19 | tutti | D | 28–34 |
| C. Gloria in excelsis | common time | SSATB | Vl Bc | E♭ | 30–31 | | | |
| 8. Deposuit potentes | 3/4 | t | 2Vl Va Bc | g | 17–20 | 2Vl Bc | f♯ | 34–36 |
| 9. Esurientes | common time | a | 2Fl Bc | F | 20–21 | 2Fl Bc | E | 36–38 |
| D. Virga Jesse floruit | 12/8 | sI b | Bc | F | 32 | | | |
| 10. Suscepit Israel | common time | sI sII a | TrI Ba | c | 22 | Ob Bc | b | 38–40 |
| 11. Sicut locutus est | common time | SSATB | Bc | E♭ | 23–24 | Bc | D | 40–42 |
| 12. Gloria Patri; Sicut erat in principio | 3/4 | SSATB | tutti | E♭ | 24–27 27–29 | tutti | D | 42–45 45–48 |

The structure of Bach's Magnificat has been compared with that of Kuhnau's, which he probably knew, and with that of Johann Philipp Krieger's Magnificat of 1685, which Kuhnau probably knew. Kuhnau's Magnificat, his largest extant vocal work, has a similar orchestration as the first version of Bach's Magnificat (differences: Kuhnau's has a second viola, Bach's has two recorders in one movement), and it has the same "expandability" with settings of the same laudes for a Christmas performance. Kuhnau's Magnificat has standard SATB soloists, but like Bach's, a SSATB choir. All three Magnificats set verses 1, 6, 10 and 12 of the Magnificat text for chorus. Kuhnau's has five choral movements, like Bach's, but his second is verse 4 (instead of 3b for Bach), and his last is only verse 12, where for Bach that final chorus sets both verse 11 and 12. In all three Magnificats the other verses are set for soloists, as a single voice or combined into duets and trios.

=== The twelve movements of the Magnificat canticle ===
==== 1. Magnificat ====
Magnificat anima mea Dominum ("My spirit gives great praise to the Lord", Luke 1:46) is the text used for the opening chorus. The movement consists of 6 blocks of 15 measures, totalling 90 bars of music, exactly half of them with choral singing:

- Measure 1–30: the orchestra presents itself with what looks like a ritornello, but is in fact rather a concerto tutti. The movement has the form of an Italian aria, modelled after the concerto style Bach had developed in Köthen: in that style the material is presented in an instrumental tutti.
  - Measure 1–15: the motive played by oboe I in the first measure sets the jubilant tone of the tutti. It is the first of two main motives.
  - Measure 16–30: in measure 16, almost imperceptible in the whirling movement of other instruments, violin I presents a new motive: it is the second main motive. The last measures before the entrance of the choir that motive is repeated by multiple instruments.

First motive (as sung by sopranos I in measure 31):
Second motive (as sung by the tenors in measure 35):

- Measure 31–75: accompanied by the continuo, the chorus enters as a concerto soloist, imitating the opening material.
  - Measure 31–45: The sopranos enter first, with the first main motive, and from measure 32 alto and tenor imitate the same. The basses enter from measure 33 while the full orchestra plays a short intervention for two measures. In measures 35–36 the chorus sings the second main motive from the opening tutti. After that the orchestra dominates again, with the chorus following or giving contrasting melodies. From the end of measure 37 voices one after another start singing "anima mea", until in the last three measures of this block all singers take the text Dominum (the Lord) once, all of them with the last syllable of that word on the first beat of the 45th measure, after which the orchestra, apart from the continuo, is silent till the beginning of measure 47: the singers bridge the central barline between measures 45 and 46 with the first main motive sung by altos, sopranos I and sopranos II consecutively.
  - Measure 46–60: after the sopranos recapitulate the start of the movement with their voices, and a brief intervention by the orchestra in measures 47–48, the second main motive is sung again, first by the highest voices in measure 49, followed by the lower voices in measure 50. In this block the chorus takes a leading role, limited groups of instruments accompanying with short ideas taken from the opening tutti, until in the last two measures all instruments join, ending with the second main motive played by trumpet I in measure 60. In this second of three blocks for the singers, the only text they sing is a repetition of the word "magnificat".
  - Measure 61–75: in the first measure of this block the altos sing the first main motive while all instruments halt for at least a few beats. The singers keep the leading role, while groups of instruments play additional motives. Later the orchestral writing thickens, returning from the subdominant to the tonic. The text remains magnificat for most of this block, the conclusion "anima mea" (my soul) is heard by the alto for the first time, in measure 67, embedded in the other voices' Magnificat. All parts sing "Dominum" once again, soprano II beginning with a long note continued by a melisma in measure 73, the others in 74.
- Measure 76–90: after 45 measures of choral singing follow fifteen measures of instrumental postlude, with material condensed from the opening tutti.

==== 2. Et exultavit ====
Et exultavit spiritus meus ("And my spirit has rejoiced [in God my Saviour]") is an aria sung by soprano II, accompanied by the strings. The aria continues the feelings of joy from the first movement, but in a less extroverted way. In the Christmas 1723 version, this movement is followed by the first interpolation, the hymn "Vom Himmel hoch da komm ich her".

==== 3. Quia respexit ====
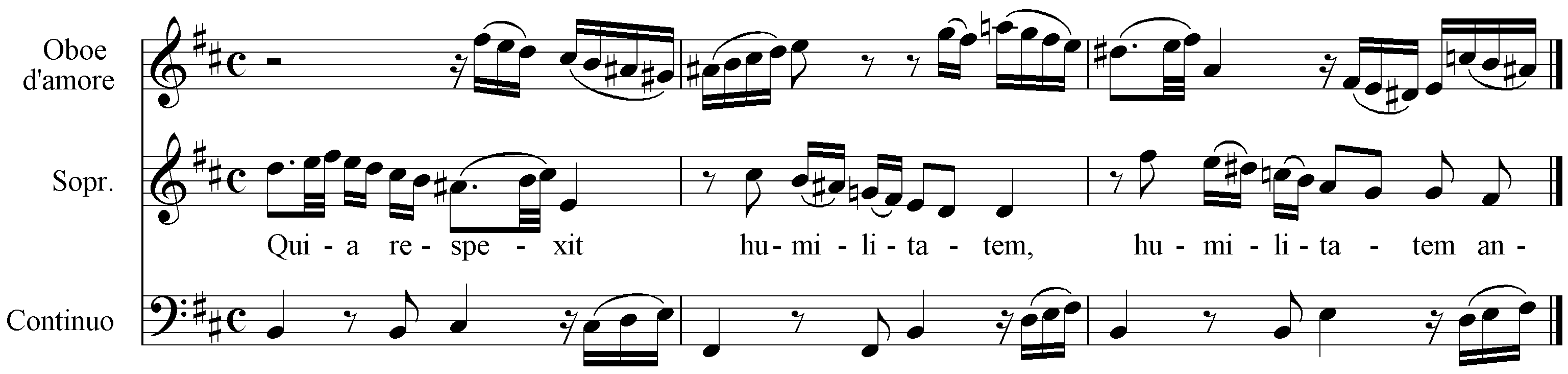
First measures of Quia respexit (B minor version)

Quia respexit humilitatem (Because he has looked upon the humility) is an aria sung by soprano I with an obbligato oboe (oboe d'amore in the D major version). It is the only movement for which Bach marked the tempo at the beginning: Adagio (only the D major version). Steinberg notes that voice and instrument first share the material in a "contemplative duet", but on ecce enim ex hoc beatam (from henceforth shall call me blessed) the voice changes to a "simpler, more declamatory style". Spitta notes: "Scarcely ever has the idea of virgin purity, simplicity, and humble happiness found more perfect expression than in this German picture of the Madonna, translated, as it were, into musical language."

==== 4. Omnes generationes ====
The continuation of the verse and completion of the sentence, Omnes generationes (all generations), is given to the chorus. The setting has been likened to a turba chorus as used by Bach in his Passions. Some commentators see an atmosphere close to aggression, others rather an evocation of multitude. The sound in the E♭ major version is somewhat harsher than in the D major version, for example the bass line in measure three, and in measure 24 where the first version has a dissonant dominant ninth which was changed to a less dissonant harmony in the later version.

==== 5. Quia fecit ====
Quia fecit mihi magna (Because he did great things for me) is an aria sung by the bass, accompanied only by the continuo. The motif, again beginning with repeated notes, is introduced by four measures of the continuo, then repeated by the voice.

==== 6. Et misericordia ====
Et misericordia (And mercy), a duet for alto and tenor, begins with an undulating movement in 12/8 time, played by violins and violas. In the D major version these strings play con sordino, flutes doubling the violins.

==== 7. Fecit potentiam ====
Fecit potentiam (He shows strength) shares its key and scoring with the first movement. The tenor is the first voice to enter, followed by alto, SII, bass and SI, leading to two calls without melismas near the middle of the movement. Dispersit appears in various voices, but then isolated, in a sequence from the highest voice to the lowest. The conclusion, mente cordis sui, is marked Adagio and illustrates the text in long chords, with accents by the trumpets.

==== 8. Deposuit ====
Deposuit potentes (He hath put down the mighty) is an aria for tenor, accompanied by continuo and unisono violins, presenting material in a 14 measure ritornello. The second thought of the verse, beginning with et exaltavit humiles (and exalted the humble), is sung without introduction. After a shorter ritornello, the tenor sings the complete text again, the first part in a slightly modified version, but the exaltation is considerably expanded after which the ritornello is repeated at the end in full.

==== 9. Esurientes ====
Opening measures of Esurientes movement (LilyPond source code by Libre art.net project)

Esurientes (The hungry) is sung by the alto, accompanied by two flutes. The ritornello of eight measures introduces a motiv moving up, on a continuo of steady quarter notes, for four measures, later sung on Esurientes implevit bonis (He hath filled the hungry with good things), while downward lines and a continuo moving in eighth notes later go with et divites dimisit (and the rich he hath sent away). In Latin, the last word is inanes (empty-handed).

==== 10. Suscepit Israel ====
Suscepit Israel (He hath holpen his servant Israel) is scored for an unusual combination of the three highest voices and two oboes in unison (a single trumpet in the E♭ major version). The wind instrument(s) cite the tonus peregrinus as a cantus firmus, on a continuo line that most of the time only changes every measure, moving one step down or up. The voices imitate each other, in gentle movement. Almost the only leaps in the whole measure occur on the word recordatus, with a downward fourth on each syllable.

==== 11. Sicut locutus est ====
Sicut locutus est (As he spake [to our fathers, to Abraham, and to his seed for ever]), the last line of the Magnificat has a theme in four distinct measures: the first repeated notes, the second flowing eighth notes, the third quarter notes in leaps, the fourth half notes leaping up a sixth. When the theme is developed the first time, four voices enter from bottom to top. In the second development, soprano I begins, followed by alto, tenor and bass. The movement ends with a more homophonic section in which the bass has the theme once more, while soprano I sings long suspended notes in a descending scale covering almost an octave.

==== 12. Gloria patri ====
Gloria Patri part of BWV 243.2
Performed by the Tudor Consort (2006)

The work is concluded by the doxology, Gloria Patri (Glory to the father), performed by the complete ensemble. The first part of the text ends in a long cadenza. After changing the time signature from common time to triple metre, the second part of the text, Sicut erat in principio (as it was in the beginning), repeats material from the beginning of the work.

=== The hymns added in the Christmas 1723 version ===
The first time the Christmas hymns of the E♭ major version of Bach's Magnificat were printed was in the same volume as the D major version of the Magnificat, in the 1862 Bach Gesellschaft XI/1 publication, which presented the hymns in an annex. In that publication the hymns were however not transposed to fit in the D major setting of the Magnificat. More recently publishers offer such transposed (and completed) versions of the hymns, so that they can be performed as part of the D major version of the Magnificat, for instance Novello in 2000 (Neil Jenkins) and Bärenreiter in 2014.

==== A. Vom Himmel hoch ====
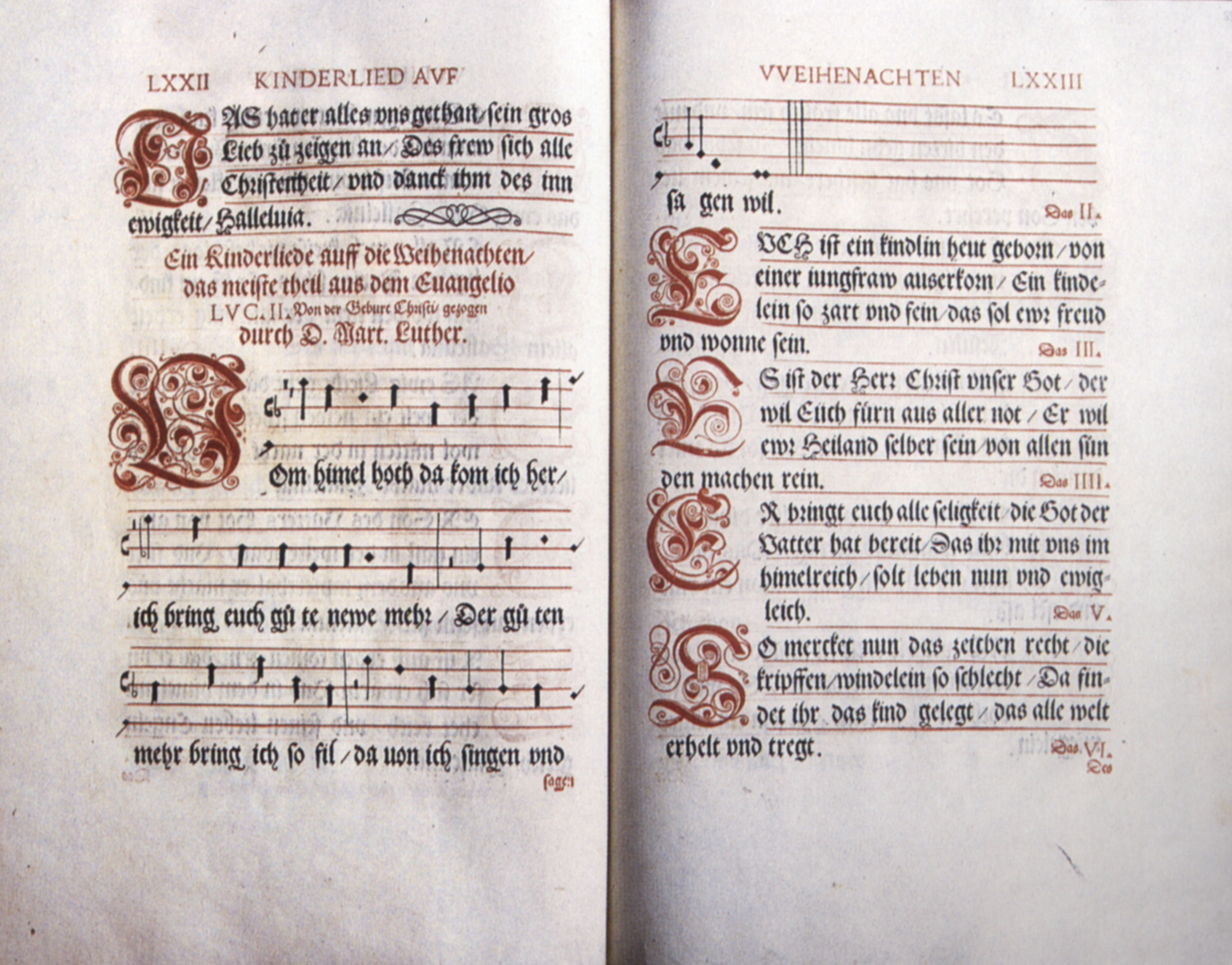
"Vom Himmel hoch", Luther's hymn in a 1541 songbook

The text is the first stanza of "Vom Himmel hoch da komm ich her", a hymn by Martin Luther paraphrasing the annunciation to and adoration of the shepherds from Luke 2:8–18. Bach sets this first laudes a cappella in four parts, and, like the two preceding movements, in the tonic key. The form is a chorale fantasia, with all sopranos singing the 1539 chorale melody attributed to Luther as a cantus firmus, while the lower voices make the counterpoint by imitating sections of the melody line in diminished time. Where the Latin of the preceding movements may have been largely incomprehensible for the congregation in Bach's time, here is a first movement that was not only recognizable for the words, but also for the melody: the Vom Himmel hoch chorale would have been sung by the congregation the preceding evening during the Christmas Eve service.

Quarter of a century later Bach returned to the chorale melody of "Vom Himmel hoch da komm' ich her", writing a set of five canonic variations on that theme (BWV 769), one of a few compositions printed during the composer's lifetime. Bach also included three settings of the chorale melody in his Christmas Oratorio. BWV 606 (in the Orgelbüchlein), 700, 701, 738 and 738a are chorale preludes based on the "Vom Himmel hoch" theme.

==== B. Freut euch und jubiliert ====
The text of this movement is "Freut euch und jubilirt, Zu Bethlehem gefunden wird Das herzeliebe Jesulein, Das soll euer Freud und Wonne sein" (Rejoice with pious mind, To Bethlehem go now and find The fair and holy new-born Boy, Who is your comfort peace, and joy), a verse by Sethus Calvisius.

For SSAT, [[B♭ major]],.

==== C. Gloria in excelsis ====
The text, "Gloria in excelsis Deo et in terra pax homínibus bona voluntas", is a variant of the opening verse of the Gloria. The better known version from the Vulgate, ending on "... bonae voluntatis", is an incorrect rendering of the original Greek version of Luke 2:14, there said by angels in the Christmas night. The Vulgate version translates as "Glory to God in the highest, and on earth peace to people of good will", while the end of the Greek version is rendered more correctly as "Peace on earth, and good will towards men", as it was understood by Luther ("Friede auf Erden und den Menschen ein Wohlgefallen"). Lutheran theologians thus rejected the Vulgate version (they would have the verse end on "... bonae voluntes" in Latin), while composers were attached to the classic formula for its melodious rhythm. This Magnificat interpolation is the only place where Bach uses a version of the Gloria text that differs from the Vulgate, more or less catching the spirit of the theologian-approved version.

For SSATB and violins, E♭ major,.

==== D. Virga Jesse floruit ====
The text is "Virga Jesse floruit, Emanuel noster apparuit, Induit carnem Hominis, Fit puer delectabilis. Alleluja." (The stem of Jesse hath flourished, Our Emanuel hath appeared, And hath put on human flesh, And become a lovely child, Alleluja!) and is a fragment of a longer Christmas hymn that was printed in Gottfried Vopelius' Neu Leipziger Gesangbuch.

For S B, F major, 12/8.

== Reception history ==
After the composer's death the autographs of both the E♭ major and the D major version of the Magnificat were owned by his son Carl Philipp Emanuel. Publication followed in the 19th century, including the Christmas hymns of the E♭ major version, and a variety of vocal and instrumental scores adapted to contemporary performance practice for the D major version. By the end of that century "The Magnificat in D (was) considered one of the grandest illustrations of Bach's genius." Generally it was also the D major version without the Christmas hymns that was chosen for performance.

A new critical edition of both BWV 243.2 and 243.1 was published in 1955 as Series 2, Volume 3 of the New Bach Edition. Although the D major version remained the standard for life performance and studio recordings, half a century later also the E♭ major version had been published in new editions adapted to performance, it had been recorded several times, and its composition history had been further unravelled.

=== 18th century ===
In 1749, a year before his father's death, Carl Philipp Emanuel Bach's Magnificat in D major had been performed in Leipzig, like his father's an extended setting. When Johann Sebastian had died, Carl Philipp Emanuel owned the autograph of both versions of his father's Magnificat, and staged the composition in Hamburg in 1786.

Laudes A and B (transposed to fit in a D major composition) were combined with a movement of a cantate by Graun (probably Carl Heinrich Graun) to form a Christmas motet, Kündlich groß ist das gottselige Geheimnis, BWV Anh. 161.

=== 19th century ===
The score of the E♭ major version of Bach's Magnificat was first published by Simrock in 1811, edited by Georg Pölchau, however with printing errors, and without the Christmas hymns. It was the first composition of Bach for vocal soloists, chorus and orchestra that was printed in orchestral score, but at the time this publication had little success in sales. When in 1822 young Felix Mendelssohn composed a Magnificat in D major he showed that he knew Bach's version.

The D major version of Bach's Magnificat did not appear in print before the Bach-revival that followed Mendelssohn's 1829 performance of the St Matthew Passion. In the 1840s a piano reduction by Robert Franz of Bach's D major version of the Magnificat appeared. In 1862 the orchestral and vocal score was published in Volume 11/1 of the Bach-Gesellschaft edition. The same edition printed the Christmas interpolations for the first time. A year later Robert Franz complained the composition had still received too little attention from music critics and so remained virtually unknown to the general public. A year later he published the D major version of the Magnificat with an orchestral score in line with 19th century performance practice, for example expanding the "organ and continuo" single stave with annotated bass from the autograph and the Bach-edition into several separate staves for organ, bassoon and celli.

Novello printed an Octavo edition of the D major Magnificat in 1874, using a translation to English which John Troutbeck based on the text in The Book of Common Prayer. In 1880, when Bach's autographs of the composition were already kept in the Royal Library (later State Library) of Berlin, Philipp Spitta devoted many pages to the Magnificat in his Bach-biography, considering it recognized as one of the greatest achievements of the composer's genius. Bach's Magnificat was performed several times in the last quarter of the 19th century, for instance in Germany and the Netherlands.

=== 20th century ===
In 1924 Arnold Schering edited the full orchestral score of the D major version of Bach's Magnificat for publication by Ernst Eulenburg and Edition Peters. Performances of the Magnificat by, among others, Serge Koussevitzky and the Boston Symphony Orchestra were recorded in the 1940s and appeared on 78 rpm records. LP recordings of the early 1950s included live performances of the Magnificat directed by Otto Klemperer and by Herbert von Karajan, the last one with Elisabeth Schwarzkopf as soprano.

The Neue Bach Ausgabe published Bach's Magnificat (both BWV 243.1 and BWV 243.2) in 1955, edited by Alfred Dürr. This Urtext score was reused in several ensuing publications by Bärenreiter, among which were several with an English translation. More recordings of the Magnificat became available, for instance directed by Kurt Redel, Leonard Bernstein, Karl Richter and Karl Ristenpart. The second half of the 1960s saw the first recordings of the Christmas version of the Magnificat BWV 243.1 including the laudes, and new recordings of the D major version by von Karajan, Karl Münchinger and Daniel Barenboim.

The earliest LP-releases that contained the Christmas laudes of BWV 243.1 inserted them, transposed, in the D major version BWV 243.2 of the Magnificat. In this form Helmuth Rilling's recording with the Bach-Collegium Stuttgart and the Figuralchor der Gedächtniskirche Stuttgart appeared in 1967 with a performance time of 40:06. Wolfgang Gönnenwein's Bach: Magnificat in D (Including Christmas Interpolations), with the Deutsche Bachsolisten and the Süddeutscher Madrigalchor appeared in the 1970s.

Bruno Maderna recorded BWV 243.1, with the choir and orchestra of the Südwestdeutscher Rundfunk, and Hedy Graf, Hildegard Laurich, Adalbert Kraus and Michael Schopper as vocal soloists, in 1971. Its CD-release as volume 8 of the Maderna Edition by Arkadia was in 1991. The first recording on period instruments of Bach's Magnificat, with the four choral Christmas interpolations (BWV 243.1), was released by Simon Preston and the Academy of Ancient Music in 1978 (L'Oiseau Lyre / Decca), coupled with Vivaldi's Gloria. Nicolaus Harnoncourt's first recording of the D major version followed in 1984. Also Helmuth Rilling and John Eliot Gardiner had by then recorded the D major version of the Magnificat.

20th century Magnificat composers often refer to Bach's composition in their new setting: Vaughan Williams (1932) and Rutter(1990) include hymns and songs outside the liturgical text in their extended settings, like Bach's Christmas version; Penderecki's extended setting (1973–74) makes musical associations to Bach's D major setting; Pärt uses na SSATB choir in his a cappella setting (1989).

Before the end of the century CD recordings of the D major version of Bach's Magnificat by Sigiswald Kuijken, Robert Shaw, Andrew Parrott, Philippe Herreweghe, Neville Marriner, Peter Schreier, Harry Christophers, Ton Koopman, and by the Bach Collegium Japan had been released. Philip Pickett's 1995 recording of the E♭ major version appeared on L'Oiseau Lyre. Other CD releases with BWV 243.1 that became available before the end of the century include a recording by Rilling and the Gächinger Kantorei, one with the Regensburger Domspatzen, and one with Rolf Schweizer, the Motettenchor Pforzheim and L'arpa festante playing on period instruments.

Novello published both the E♭ major and the D major version of the Magnificat in a single publication in 2000, edited by Neil Jenkins. This edition also offered a transposed version of the Christmas 1723 laudes so that they could be fitted in performances of the D major version of the Magnificat. The last measures of the Virga Jesse, missing from the autograph score, were in this edition completed on the basis of a similar composition by Bach.

=== 21st century ===
Philippe Herreweghe's 2002 recording of BWV 243.1 with Collegium Vocale Gent was released by Harmonia Mundi in 2003. In 2003 Ton Koopman recorded the Christmas version of Bach's Magnificat with Amsterdam Baroque in the St. Thomas church in Leipzig. A DVD of the recording, which included a performance of Kuhnau's Magnificat with his four Christmas interpolations, and of Bach's German Magnificat BWV 10, was released in 2004. Thomas Hengelbrock's recording of BWV 243.1, with the Balthasar-Neumann-Chor and Ensemble, was released by Deutsche Harmonia Mundi in 2008. In 2009 Philippe Pierlot performed the D major version of the Magnificat with the Ricercar Consort, with five vocal soloists without choir.

Facsimiles of Bach's autographs of both versions of the Magnificat became available on-line. Bärenreiter published a critical edition of all score versions, based on Dürr's 1955 edition, again in 2014/15. The "synthetic" D major version, that is the D major version of the Magnificat with the Christmas laudes transposed to fit in that version, now published both by Novello and Bärenreiter, found performers and audiences.

That the composition ranges among Bach's most popular vocal works is illustrated by its regular appearance in classical music polls like Klara's Top 75/Top 100. In December 2016, Bach's autograph of the D major version of his Magnificat was among the top three most visited scores at the Bach Digital website.
