= Es reißet euch ein schrecklich Ende, BWV 90 =

1723 church cantata by J S Bach

Es reißet euch ein schrecklich Ende
- BWV 90
- Church cantata by J. S. Bach
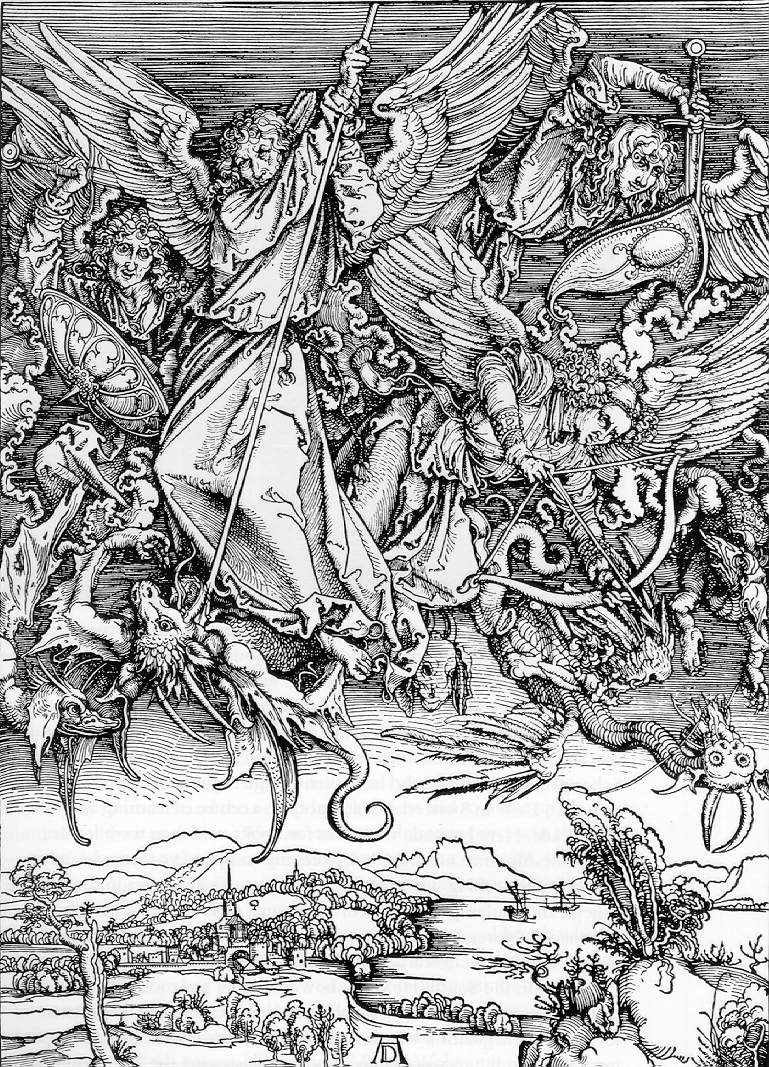
- Woodcut by Albrecht Dürer, depicting Tribulation, the topic of the gospel
- Occasion: 25th Sunday after Trinity
- Chorale: by Martin Moller
- Performed: 14 November 1723: Leipzig
- Movements: 5
- Vocal: alto, tenor and bass soloists; SATB choir
- Instrumental: trumpet; 2 violins; viola; continuo

Johann Sebastian Bach composed the church cantata Es reißet euch ein schrecklich Ende (A horrible end will carry you off), BWV 90, in Leipzig for the 25th Sunday after Trinity and first performed it on 14 November 1723.

== History and words ==
Bach composed the cantata in his first year in Leipzig for the 25th Sunday after Trinity. The prescribed readings for the Sunday were from the First Epistle to the Thessalonians, the coming of the Lord (1 Thessalonians 4:13–18), and from the Gospel of Matthew, the Tribulation (Matthew 24:25–28). The closing chorale is the seventh stanza of Martin Moller's hymn "Nimm von uns, Herr, du treuer Gott" (1584), sung to the melody of "Vater unser im Himmelreich".

Bach first performed the cantata on 14 November 1723.

== Scoring and structure ==
The cantata in five movements is scored for three vocal soloists—alto, tenor and bass—a four-part choir only in the closing chorale, trumpet, two violins, viola, and basso continuo.

1. Aria (tenor): Es reißet euch ein schrecklich Ende
2. Recitative (alto): Des Höchsten Güte wird von Tag zu Tage neu
3. Aria (bass): So löschet im Eifer der rächende Richter
4. Recitative (tenor): Doch Gottes Auge sieht auf uns
5. Chorale: Leit uns mit deiner rechten Hand

== Music ==
The cantata's two arias "paint a dismal picture", as Klaus Hofmann remarks. The opening tenor aria is "expressively highly intense" for both the singer and the violins, illustrating "reißet" (tears). John Eliot Gardiner, who calls the cantata "magnificently theatrical and terse", notes: "Bach seems, in fact, to be taking on his entire generation of Italian opera composers and beating them at their own game. The unflagging energy of his melodic invention and rhythmic propulsion is always directed towards giving truthful expression to the text, and here it is as matchless as it is exciting". The following recitative first states in great contrast that "God's goodness is renewed every day", but then reflects "despair at human failings". The second aria, "So löschet im Eifer der rächende Richter" (Extinguish with haste will the judge in his vengeance) is sung by the bass, with "added emphasis by the presence of the trumpet." The instrument is meant to be the one calling for the Last Judgement, as mentioned in the epistle reading. The last recitative finally turns to the thought that "God's eye looks upon us as the chosen ones". The closing chorale is a four-part setting.

== Recordings ==
- Les Grandes Cantates de J. S. Bach Vol. 15, Fritz Werner, Heinrich-Schütz-Chor Heilbronn, Pforzheim Chamber Orchestra, Claudia Hellmann, Helmut Krebs, Erich Wenk, Erato 1963
- J. S. Bach: Kantaten · Cantatas Nr. 89, Nr. 90, Nr. 161, Jaap Schröder, Monteverdi-Chor, Concerto Amsterdam, Helen Watts, Kurt Equiluz, Max van Egmond, Telefunken 1965
- Die Bach Kantate Vol. 59, Helmuth Rilling, Gächinger Kantorei, Bach-Collegium Stuttgart, Helen Watts, Adalbert Kraus, Siegmund Nimsgern, Hänssler 1978
- J. S. Bach: Das Kantatenwerk · Complete Cantatas · Les Cantates, Folge / Vol. 22 – BWV 84-90, Gustav Leonhardt, Knabenchor Hannover, Collegium Vocale Gent, Leonhardt-Consort, Paul Esswood, Kurt Equiluz, Max van Egmond, Telefunken 1978
- J. S. Bach: Complete Cantatas Vol. 8, Ton Koopman, Amsterdam Baroque Orchestra & Choir, Bogna Bartosz, Jörg Dürmüller, Klaus Mertens, Antoine Marchand 1998
- Bach Edition Vol. 8 – Cantatas Vol. 3, Pieter Jan Leusink, Holland Boys Choir, Netherlands Bach Collegium, Sytse Buwalda, Knut Schoch, Bas Ramselaar, Brilliant Classics 1999
- J. S. Bach: Cantatas Vol. 15 – Cantatas from Leipzig 1723 – BWV 40, 60, 70, 90, Masaaki Suzuki, Bach Collegium Japan, Robin Blaze, Gerd Türk, Peter Kooy, BIS 2000
- Bach Cantatas Vol. 10: Potsdam / Wittenberg / For the 19th Sunday after Trinity, John Eliot Gardiner, Monteverdi Choir, English Baroque Soloists, William Towers, James Gilchrist, Peter Harvey, Soli Deo Gloria 2000
- J. S. Bach: Kantate BWV 90 "Es reisset euch ein schrecklich Ende", Rudolf Lutz, Schola Seconda Pratica, Leonie Gloor, Antonia Frey, Bernhard Berchthold, Klaus Häger, Gallus Media 2010

== Sources ==
- Es reißet euch ein schrecklich Ende, BWV 90: Scores at the International Music Score Library Project
- Cantata BWV 90 Es reißet euch ein schrecklich Ende history, scoring, sources for text and music, translations to various languages, discography, discussion, Bach Cantatas Website
- BWV 90 Es reißet euch ein schrecklich Ende English translation, University of Vermont
- BWV 90 Es reißet euch ein schrecklich Ende text, scoring, University of Alberta (in German)
- Luke Dahn: BWV 90.5 bach-chorales.com
