= Hermann Weißenborn =

German baritone and singing teacher (1876–1959)

Hermann Weißenborn (10 September 1876 – 20 November 1959) was a German operatic baritone and voice teacher.

Born in Berlin, Weißenborn was trained musically mostly by Raimund von Zur Mühlen. He began a career as a concert and oratorio singer. He turned early to music education. He became one of the most sought-after singing teachers of his generation in Germany. From 1920 he taught at the Musikhochschule Berlin. Since 1922 he was head of the singing department of this university. Among his many well-known students were Joseph Schmidt, Dietrich Fischer-Dieskau, Elisabeth Höngen, Marga Höffgen, Hildegard Rütgers and Petre Munteanu.

Weißenborn died in Berlin at age 83.
