= Francesco Lambardi =

Italian composer

Francesco Lambardi (1587–1642) was a Neapolitan Baroque composer who participated in the staging of feste a ballo with Giovanni Maria Trabaci. He was born in Naples.

== Recordings ==
- Canto d'Amore on Festa teatrale, Thomas Hengelbrock, DHM.
