= Hermann Oswald =

German tenor in opera and concert

Hermann Oswald is a German tenor in opera and concert.

Oswald received his first musical training as a member of the Tölzer Knabenchor. Among his operatic roles were Monostatos in Mozart's Zauberflöte under Achim Freyer in Schwetzingen and Strasbourg and Monteverdi's L'Orfeo under Ivor Bolton at the Bavarian State Opera. In 1997–98 he performed with the Bach Kantorei, singing Handel's Messiah. He recorded Bach's Mass in B minor with Thomas Hengelbrock.
