= Hildegard Rütgers =

German singer

- Born: 1930; Germany
- Education: Folkwangschule; University of Cologne; Free University of Berlin
- Occupation: Classical contralto

Hildegard Rütgers (born 1930) is a German classical contralto singer in opera and concert.

== Biography ==
Rütgers began her training with Hermann Weißenborn in Berlin, then studied briefly in Italy and then with Hilde Wesselmann at the Folkwangschule in Essen. At the university level, she took courses in music science at both the University of Cologne and the Free University of Berlin.

Rütgers joined the Städtische Oper Berlin as a contralto from 1957 to 1959, specializing also in oratorio performances, and then worked with the Hamburg State Opera and at the Opera house of Essen until 1963. Between 1963 and 1965 she performed at the Salzburg Festival, the part of Die Vertraute (Her confidante) in a production of Elektra by Richard Strauss, conducted by Herbert von Karajan, alongside Astrid Varnay in the title role, and Martha Mödl, Hildegard Hillebrecht, James King and Eberhard Waechter in leading parts. The production of Mozart's Die Zauberflöte at the Salzburg Festival, with Rütgers as the Third Boy, was filmed and released as a made-for-television-movie in 1964. She appeared alongside Walter Kreppel as Sarastro, Roberta Peters as the Queen of the Night, Pilar Lorengar and Waldemar Kmentt as Pamina and Tamino, and Renate Holm and Walter Berry as Papagena and Papageno, in the production staged by Otto Schenk and conducted by Istvan Kertesz.

In 1965, Rütgers toured North America and performed works by Handel and Bach. She recorded the first version of Bach's Magnificat with Helmuth Rilling in 1967.

In the 1970s, she no longer accepted long engagements but selected individual appearances. She performed in 1974 in Anton Bruckner's Mass No. 3 and Te Deum with the choir Philharmonischer Chor Schwäbisch Gmünd, featuring Günter Reich, Kari Løvaas and Kurt Huber with the Nuremberg Symphony Orchestra.
