= Hedy Graf =

- Born: 12 October 1926; Barcelona, Spain
- Died: 31 January 1997 (aged 70); Benken, Zürich, Switzerland
- Occupation: Classical soprano
- Spouse: Werner Esser

Hedy Graf (12 October 1926 – 31 January 1997) was a Spanish-born Swiss classically trained soprano. She traveled widely throughout Switzerland and Germany. Her concert repertory focused on both Baroque and contemporary music, including premières of oratorios.

== Career ==
Hedy Graf was born on 12 October 1926 in Barcelona. From 1949 to 1952, she studied both privately with Regine Salomon of Zürich and at the Conservatory of Zürich. In 1952, she studied in London with Roy Henderson and completed her training with Sylvia Gaehwiller in Zürich.

Beginning in 1955, Graf performed in Switzerland and Germany a broad repertory of oratorios and sacred vocal works. She sang compositions by Bach, Beethoven, Bruckner, Handel, Haydn, and Mozart, as well as contemporary music by composers such as Willy Burkhard, Paul Hindemith, Frank Martin, Othmar Schoeck, Arnold Schoenberg, and Igor Stravinsky.

Graf participated in the première of works including in 1965 presentations in Zürich and Basel of Cantico di frate brine di San Francesco d’Assisi by Rudolf Moser, in 1966 the oratorio Jeremia by Ernst Hess, and a 1977 broadcast on Radio Zürich of Tenebrae by Martin Schlumpf. In 1972 she appeared in a broadcast by the BBC of Alessandro Scarlatti’s cantata Arianna. She also toured in Antwerp, Scheveningen, Strasbourg, Vienna, Tel Aviv, and Jerusalem.

Graf was married to the violist Werner Esser. When she retired from singing, she worked as a teacher at the canton schools in Küsnacht and Zürich. She was a resident of Benken, Zürich, until her death on 31 January 1997.

== Recordings ==
Graf appeared as a soloist in several Bach cantatas in the series conducted by Fritz Werner, and also in 1966 Bach's Ascension Oratorio alongside Barbara Scherler, Kurt Huber and Jakob Stämpfli. She recorded Bach's first version of the Magnificat with Bruno Maderna in 1971, alongside Hildegard Laurich, Adalbert Kraus and Michael Schopper. She recorded Handel's Messias for the label Cantate and Mozart's Requiem for Pallas.
