= Klaus Häger =

German bass singer

Klaus Häger (born 1965 in Wuppertal) is a German bass singer. He studied under Franz Müller-Heuser, Ingeborg Most and Jürgen Glauß in Köln and Freiburg, before attending master-classes with Ernst Haefliger and Dietrich Fischer-Dieskau. From 1991 he was a member of the Hamburg State Opera, and the Staatsoper Unter den Linden in Berlin from 1997. He is noted in particular for his recordings of J. S. Bach, including BWV 244, 205, 213, 248, 26, 36, 90, 129, 135, 140, 173a, 207, and BWV 243a. Häger has sung in Lieder recitals and made numerous recordings for German television, and has also performed at festivals such as Salzburg Festival, Schwetzingen Festival, Schleswig-Holstein Musik Festival and Ludwigsburg Festival.
