= Sebastian Noack =

German baritone

Sebastian Noack (born 1969 in Berlin) is a German baritone. After attending master classes with Dietrich Fischer-Dieskau and Aribert Reimann, he won 1st prize at the Bundeswettbewerb Gesang in Berlin 1996 and was awarded 2nd prize at the International Song Competition at Wigmore Hall the following year. He is noted for his recitals of J.S. Bach, including BWV 245, 63, 133 and BWV 243a. A 2004 Gramophone article wrote of his performance as King Cosroe in Hasse's Siroe: "Sebastian Noack provides a full and warm baritone in Cosroe's music and makes a good deal of the sombre 'Gelido, in ogni vena' ".
