= Claudia Darius =

German singer

- Born: Cologne, Germany
- Occupation: Classical mezzo-soprano
- Years active: 1959–present
- Website: www.claudia-darius-mezzo.de

Claudia Darius is a classically trained, German mezzo-soprano. She studied both German literature and history before turning to singing, beginning her musical training at the Bergischen Gesangsinstitut (Bergischen Singing Institute) and then in 1993 began studying with Christoph Scheeben. As a specialist in lieder, she has pursued master classes with Ingeborg Danz, Diane Forlano, Benjamin Luxon, Barbara Pearson, and Anthony Rolfe-Johnson.

She performs all musical styles from contemporary to baroque and has sung in Germany and abroad completing tours in Austria, Czech Republic, Guatemala, Italy, Poland and Spain. Her repertoire includes Brahms' Alto Rhapsody, Monteverdi's complaint about Bach's oratorios, and premiers with both Peter Michael Hamel and Manos Tsangaris. She has appeared at such venues as the Frankfurter Festival of Frankfurt and the New Music Days Festival in Witten and has worked with renowned conductors including such as Alicja Mounck, Peter Neumann, Helmuth Rilling, and Gothard Stierl. In 1993 she won the singing competition of the Verband Deutscher Konzertchöre (VDKC).
