= Gundula Bernàt-Klein =

German soprano

Gundula Bernàt-Klein is a German soprano. She is noted for her Bach recordings, such as BWV 243a and BWV 95. In 1967 she recorded with Harrad Wehruyng and Wilhelm Pommerien under conductor Wilhelm Ehmann at Petrikirche in Herford, Germany.
