= Ruth Sandhoff =

German classically trained mezzo-soprano

- Born: Aachen, Germany
- Education: Hochschule für Musik und Tanz Köln; Hochschule für Musik Freiburg
- Occupation: Classical mezzo-soprano

Ruth Sandhoff is a German classically trained mezzo-soprano. Her concert repertory ranges from early Baroque to contemporary music, with a special fondness for lieder.

== Biography ==
Ruth Sandhoff was born in Aachen, Germany. She studied singing at the Hochschule für Musik und Tanz Köln and then studied with Ingeborg Most at the Hochschule für Musik Freiburg, graduating in 1993. Sandhoff has continued training in master classes with Elisabeth Glauser, Sena Jurinac, Cornelia Kallisch and Anna Reynolds.

In 1996 and 1997 Sandhoff sang at notable music festivals in both Europe and the United States, including: the Oregon Bach Festival, Internationale Maifestspiele Wiesbaden, Musique en Picardie, Festival of Flanders, Bach Festival of Philadelphia and European Musikfest Stuttgart. Recent festival appearances include the Melbourne International Arts Festival, the La Folle Journée in Nantes and Folles Journées de Lisbon.

Sandhoff has sung as a soloist with Oper Leipzig, Hessisches Staatstheater Wiesbaden, Oper Köln, and Stadttheater Aachen. With Rilling, she performed in the United States with Bach's Mass in B minor and Matthäus-Passion. She has also performed with the conductors Jos van Immerseel and Volker Hempfling. She sang Schubert's lieder for choreographer Sasha Waltz in performances in Barcelona, Berlin, Lyon, Rome, Stockholm, among others.

Her repertoire ranges from early Baroque to contemporary music and has included many television, radio and recording performances. She recorded the first version of Bach's Magnificat, singing the soprano II part, with Helmuth Rilling in 2000, Ezio with Michael Hofstetter, and Carl Philipp Emanuel Bach's Magnificat with Michael Schneider, singing the alto part.
