= Jürgen Banholzer =

German singer

- Born: Germany
- Genres: Baroque music
- Occupations: Counter-tenor, musicologist

Jürgen Banholzer is a German counter-tenor and musicologist. He studied at the Conservatoire national supérieur de musique et de danse de Lyon and the Schola Cantorum Basiliensis, and was taught by Michael Chance and Gérard Lesne. He is particularly known for his interpretations of J.S. Bach and Handel, and other Baroque chamber works. He has performed with the Concerto Köln, Freiburger Barockorchester, Balthasar-Neumann-Ensemble, La Fenice, Clemencic Consort, and Il Seminario Musicale ensembles.
