= Verband Deutscher Konzertchöre =

The Verband Deutscher KonzertChöre (VDKC, Association of German Concert Choirs) is a national association with seven state organisations. It represents more than 550 member choirs with more than 30,400 singers. It is a non-profit organisation, which based in Neuss.

The members are concert choirs, oratorio choirs and chamber choirs who perform concerts of high quality, in genres such as Gregorian Chant, Baroque cantata, romantic period motet, contemporary oratorio and choral gospel music.

== History ==
The association was founded in 1921 as Schutzverband Deutscher Konzertgebender Vereine. It was renamed in 1925 as Reichsverband der gemischten Chöre Deutschlands. It was newly founded after World War II as Verband gemischter Chöre Deutschlands, renamed in 1956 as Verband Deutscher Oratorien- und Kammerchöre. After the reunification of German, a common national organisation was formed, labelled Verband Deutscher KonzertChöre. The national office is in Weimar, led from 2000 by general secretary Ralf Schöne. In 2013, Ekkehard Klemm was elected president of the VDKC.

The organisation offers their members contracts with GEMA and provides advice in artistic, organisational and legal matters. Facts and news around choral concert singing are published in the trade paper Chor und Konzert, once a year. The festival Deutsches Chorfestival is held irregularly, around four years apart. The association represents the members in the Deutscher Musikrat (German Music Council).
