= Matthias Horn =

German baritone

- Born: Germany
- Occupation: Baritone singer
- Style: Classical

Matthias Horn is a German baritone. He studied in church music in Heidelberg with Wolfgang Neumann, Eva Marguerre and Gisela Rühmert. He is particularly noted for his interpretations of J. S. Bach, including St John Passion, BWV 245, at the Nicolai Church of Leipzig, BWV 232 At Freiburg Concert Hall and BWV 244 at St. Petersburg Philharmonic Concert Hall. He has sung with ensembles such as the Orlando di Lasso-Ensemble, the Weser Renaissance and Musica Fiata, and with conductors such as Thomas Hengelbrock, Frieder Bernius and Hermann Max.
