= Susanne Rydén =

Swedish soprano (born 1962)

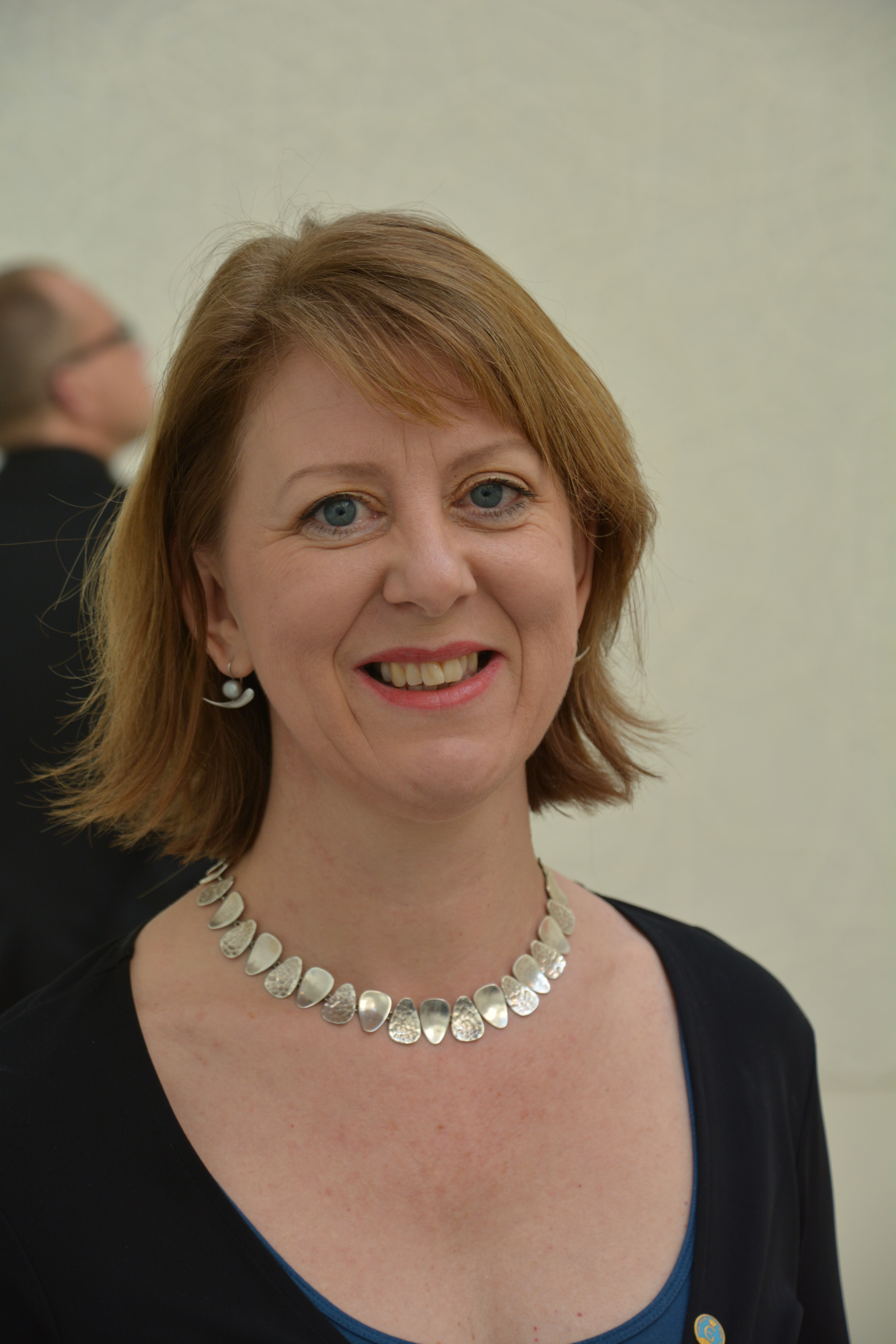
- Born: Susanne Ingegerd Rydén; 2 October 1962 (age 63); Hjärtlanda, Jönköping County, Sweden
- Occupation: Classical soprano
- Years active: 1990–present

Susanne Ingegerd Rydén (born 2 October 1962) is a Swedish soprano who has been called "Sweden's most renowned singer specialising in early and classical music". She has performed across Europe and abroad. She is currently the preses (chairman) of the Royal Swedish Academy of Music.

== Career ==
Rydén was born in Hjärtlanda, Jönköping County, Sweden. She studied Renaissance to Classical music and singing with Berit Hallqvist at the Royal College of Music, Stockholm; with René Jacobs at the Schola Cantorum Basiliensis in Basel, Switzerland; and with Jessica Cash in London. In 1990, Ryden released her first solo album, Bella Madre de 'Fiori for Prophone' , which featured Italian music from the 1500s to the 1700s and was recorded in Petruskyrkan, Stocksund, Sweden. Rydén made her debut in 1991, and has focused on early music.

In 1995, she made her debut at the Drottningholm Palace Theatre with Soler's Una cosa rara which was conducted by Nicholas McGegan. In 1996, she toured worldwide with the European Union Baroque Orchestra under the direction of Roy Goodman. She performed a concert in Australia at the Perth International Arts Festival, sang Bach's Wedding cantata O holder Tag, erwünschte Zeit, BWV 210, with the Academy of Ancient Music in Italy and produced a recording with the Swedish trumpeter, Niklas Eklund, in 1997. Rydén's 1998 appearances included performances at the Regensburg festival Tage Alter Musik with Lars Ulrik Mortensen, L'Amfiparnaso by Orazio Vecchi with the Stockholm Baroque Soloists (a group she helped found), and the role of "Angelica" in Handel's Orlando conducted by Goodman at the NorrlandsOperan. During 1999, she sang with counter-tenor Mikael Bellini in three concerts at the Drottningholm Theatre with Roy Goodman; toured with Gustav Leonhardt giving concerts in Boston and New York; and performed the part of "Dido" in Purcell's Dido and Aeneas in St. Gallen, Switzerland.

In 2004, Rydén performed a music drama "Christina's Journey" based on the life of Christina, Queen of Sweden, which she had researched. The music is a combination of instrumental works, arias and dances by several Baroque composers including Marco Marazzoli, Luigi Rossi and Giacomo Carissimi. Rydén sang the soprano parts, and performed recitations and dance. It was staged in London, Rome, Stockholm and Uppsala. The production was honored with several prizes and broadcast on Swedish television. That same year, Hans-Ola Ericsson wrote an opera Song of Songs for her, and she performed the soprano part. In 2005, she played the role of "Meleagro" in Handel's Atalanta with the Philharmonia Baroque Orchestra in Berkeley and in 2006, she appeared as Titania in Purcell's Fairy Queen performed at the Festwochen Herrenhausen. Rydén worked with Mark Tatlow, who plays fortepiano in 2007 on chamber music recordings of Joseph Haydn. In 2008, she sang "Dorinda" in Orlando by Handel at the Deutschen Theater in Göttingen and in 2009 she performed in Japan with the Bach Collegium Japan under Masaaki Suzuki.

Rydén was made a member of the Royal Swedish Academy of Music in 2007. Since 2015 she is the Preses (chairman) of the Academy. She has been called "Sweden's most renowned singer specialising in early and classical music". She has performed as a soloist at concerts and music festivals across Europe and toured worldwide including performances in Australia, Japan, Russia, South Africa, and the United States. In addition she has made numerous award-winning recordings for various labels including Avie, BIS, Caprice, CPO Germany, and Harmonia Mundi, among others. She also teaches singing, having taught Baroque singing at the Royal College of Music in Stockholm and the Scandinavian Bach Academy in Örebro.

In 1988 she married Hans Bjerhag (born 1959). She has recently (2018) taken the post of managing director of Musik i Syd, a music institution in southern Sweden, with office in Malmö.
