= Romy Kalb-Gundermann =

German soprano (1934–2019)

Romy Gundermann
- Born: 2 April 1934; Aschaffenburg, Germany
- Died: 20 October 2019 (aged 85); Aschaffenburg, Germany
- Other name: Romy Kalb-Gundermann
- Occupation: Classical soprano
- Years active: 1959–1990s
- Spouse: Alfred Kalb

Romy Kalb-Gundermann (2 April 1934 – 20 October 2019) was a German soprano who performed from 1959 to the early 1990s throughout Germany and its neighboring countries. After her retirement from the concert stage, she worked as a concert promoter and charity event organizer.

== Life ==
Romy Gundermann was born in 1934 in Aschaffenburg to a family that encouraged her musical talent. At 13, she began appearing in productions, including a opera on the fairy tale Hänsel und Gretel.

Romy Gundermann married shortly after graduating from high school and had two children. Her husband, Alfred Kalb, was a pianist, but gave up his music career to run his family's shirt company. He encouraged his wife to pursue her desire to sing, and she began performing in Frankfurt and Munich. Her official debut was in 1959 at the Stadttheater Aschaffenburg (municipal theatre), where "critics praised her unique timbre, the softness of her singing and her high luminosity".

She performed throughout Germany and neighboring countries; and as a representative of the Goethe-Institut, toured India and Egypt. She appeared in the Berliner Philharmonie over 30 times, and sang in Mozart's Coronation Mass at the Salzburg Festival. She won many competitions and made many recordings.

In the 1980s, Romy Kalb-Gundermann began organizing charity concerts, including the "ECCO - Help through Art" project, an innovative program promoting local talent which uses its concert revenues to complete public works projects.

Romy Kalb-Gundermann retired from the concert stage in the early 1990s, but continued as a concert organizer, with such events as the Advent concert series for Aschaffenburg, and spring concerts which included Wenn die Magnolien blüh'n.

In 2014, Romy Kalb-Gundermann and her husband Alfred Klab received a Public Service Medal of Aschaffenburg (de) for their commitment to expanding music awareness and their contributions to the town's cultural heritage.

Romy Kalb-Gundermann died on October 20, 2019, shortly after the death of her husband, Alfred Kalb, on September 1.
