= Wolfgang Gönnenwein =

German conductor (1933–2015)

- Born: 29 January 1933; Schwäbisch Hall, Baden-Württemberg, Germany
- Died: 26 July 2015 (aged 82)
- Education: University of Heidelberg; University of Tübingen
- Occupations: Conductor; Academic teacher
- Organizations: Staatstheater Stuttgart; Ludwigsburger Schlossfestspiele; Musikhochschule Stuttgart

Wolfgang Gönnenwein (29 January 1933 – 26 July 2015) was a German conductor and an academic teacher.

== Biography ==
Born in Schwäbisch Hall, Wolfgang Gönnenwein studied music and German studies at the University of Heidelberg and the University of Tübingen. In 1959 he became the conductor of the choir Süddeutscher Madrigalchor (South German Madrigal Chorus). He also conducted the choir of the Bach-Verein Köln from 1969 until 1973.

In 1968 he was appointed Professor for choral conducting at the Staatliche Hochschule für Musik und Darstellende Kunst Stuttgart. In 1973 he was elected Rektor (president), serving until 1982. He also directed the Ludwigsburger Schlossfestspiele until 2004.

He was Generalintendant (General Manager) of the Staatstheater Stuttgart from 1985 to 1992.

For EMI, Gönnenwein recorded many of Bach's sacred works, including the St Matthew Passion, as well as Haydn's oratorios and Mozart's Requiem.

Gönnenwein died on 26 July 2015 at the age of 82.
