= Michael Schopper =

German opera singer

- Born: 28 May 1942 (age 83); Germany
- Education: Regensburger Domspatzen
- Occupations: Classical bass-baritone; Academic teacher
- Organizations: Richard Strauss Conservatory; Hochschule für Musik und Darstellende Kunst Frankfurt am Main
- Awards: ARD International Music Competition

Michael Schopper (born 28 May 1942) is a German bass-baritone in opera and concert, and an academic teacher.

Michael Schopper was educated with the Regensburger Domspatzen and studied on a scholarship of the Studienstiftung des deutschen Volkes church music and voice at the Hochschule für Musik und Theater München. He won a first prize of the ARD International Music Competition in 1968, which resulted in an international career. His operatic parts have included Osmin in Mozart's Die Entführung aus dem Serail, Ochs in Der Rosenkavalier by Richard Strauss, and the Wagner parts Sachs in Die Meistersinger von Nürnberg, Daland in Der fliegende Holländer, and Wotan in Der Ring des Nibelungen.

He turned more to Lied and oratorio, with a focus on historically informed performances conducted by Philippe Herreweghe, Ton Koopman and Gustav Leonhardt, among others.

On 23 June 1990 he was a soloist in the premiere of Wilfried Hiller's oratorio Schulamit at the festival Landshuter Hofmusiktage. In 2002 Schopper performed the part of Haman in a concert version of Handel's Esther at the Halle Handel Festival, with the Collegium Vocale Gent and La Stagione Frankfurt conducted by Michael Schneider.

Schopper was a bass soloist in the first recording with period instruments of Bach's St Matthew Passion, conducted in 1970 by Nikolaus Harnoncourt, singing the chorus II parts. He recorded with the Salzburger Hofmusik Carl Philipp Emanuel Bach's oratorio Die Israeliten in der Wüste. He recorded the part of Seneca in Monteverdi's L'incoronazione di Poppea with René Jacobs in 1990.

Schopper is a professor of voice at the Richard Strauss Conservatory in Munich and at the Hochschule für Musik und Darstellende Kunst Frankfurt am Main.
