= Thomas Hengelbrock =

German violinist, musicologist, stage director and conductor

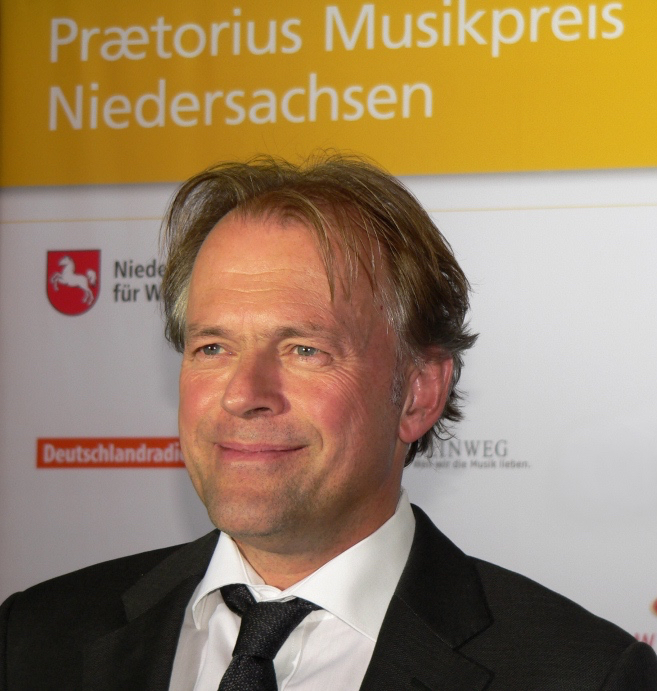
- Hengelbrock in 2012
- Born: Hans Thomas Hengelbrock; 9 June 1958 (age 68); Wilhelmshaven, West Germany
- Education: Hochschule für Musik Würzburg; Hochschule für Musik Freiburg
- Occupations: Violinist; Musicologist; Stage director; Conductor
- Organizations: Balthasar-Neumann-Chor; Balthasar-Neumann-Ensemble; NDR Elbphilharmonie Orchestra; Freiburger Barockorchester
- Spouse: Johanna Wokalek (m. 2012)
- Parent(s): Günther Hengelbrock, Dorothea Elisabeth (Schliefert) Hengelbrock

Hans Thomas Hengelbrock (born 9 June 1958) is a German violinist, musicologist, stage director and conductor.

== Biography ==
Hengelbrock was born in Wilhelmshaven, the son of teachers Günther and Dorothea Elisabeth (Schliefert) Hengelbrock. He studied the violin with Rainer Kussmaul. He started his career in Würzburg and Freiburg im Breisgau. He worked as an assistant to Witold Lutosławski, Mauricio Kagel and Antal Doráti and played with ensembles such as the Concentus Musicus Wien. In 1985, he cofounded the Freiburger Barockorchester, where he worked as a violinist and a leader of the ensemble.

In 1991, Hengelbrock founded the Balthasar Neumann Chor in Freiburg. Subsequently, in 1995, he established the Balthasar Neumann Ensemble as a parallel orchestra with its namesake choir, to perform works from Baroque to contemporary music in Historically informed performances. He continues to work both Balthasar Neumann ensembles regularly. From 1995 to 1999, he was the first artistic director of the Deutsche Kammerphilharmonie Bremen. He was music director of the Volksoper Wien from 2000 to 2003. In 2001, he founded the "Feldkirch Festival" in Feldkirch, Vorarlberg, and served as its artistic director until 2006.

In 2011, Hengelbrock became chief conductor of the NDR Symphony Orchestra in 2011. During his tenure, the orchestra took up new residence at the new Elbphilharmonie concert hall in Hamburg, and changed its name to the NDR Elbphilharmonie Orchestra. In June 2017, the orchestra announced that Hengelbrock is to conclude his tenure with the ensemble at the close of the 2018–2019 season. In December 2017, Hengelbrock expressed his displeasure with the timing of the announcement of his designated successor, Alan Gilbert, within the same month as the original announcement of the previously scheduled conclusion of his tenure. Hengelbrock thus announced his intention to stand down as chief conductor of the NDR Elbphilharmonie Orchestra at the end of the 2017–2018 season, one season earlier than originally planned.

In January 2024, the Orchestre de chambre de Paris announced the appointment of Hengelbrock as its next music director, effective with the 2024-2025 season.

== Selected recordings ==
- Festa teatrale : carnival in Venice & Florence – Pietro Antonio Giramo, Giovanni Legrenzi, Claudio Monteverdi, Francesco Lambardi, Diego Ortiz, Orazio Vecchi, Salamone Rossi, Tarquinio Merula, Giovanni Giacomo Gastoldi – Balthasar-Neumann-Chor, Balthasar-Neumann-Ensemble, Deutsche Harmonia Mundi 2000
- Music For San Marco In Venice – Claudio Monteverdi, Giovanni Gabrieli, Francesco Cavalli, Giovanni Croce, Alessandro Grandi, Biagio Marini, Claudio Merulo – Balthasar-Neumann-Ensemble, Balthasar-Neumann-Choir
- Aus der Notenbibliothek von Johann Sebastian Bach Vol. 1 (From the music library of Johann Sebastian Bach) – Tomaso Albinoni, Francesco Conti, Pietro Locatelli, George Frideric Handel, Johann Sebastian Bach – Sibylla Rubens, Balthasar-Neumann-Ensemble, Hänssler Classic, 2002
- From The Music Library Of Johann Sebastian Bach Vol. 2: Pachelbel, J. S. Bach, J. C. Kerll CD 2005
- Mozart: Il re pastore – Annette Dasch, Marlis Petersen, Krešimir Špicer, Arpiné Rahdjian, Andreas Karasiak, Balthasar-Neumann-Ensemble, Deutsche Grammophon, DVD 2006

Cultural offices
Preceded by (no predecessor)	Artistic Director, Deutsche Kammerphilharmonie Bremen; 1995–1998	Succeeded by Daniel Harding (music director)
Preceded by Christoph von Dohnányi	Chief Conductor, NDR Elbphilharmonie Orchestra; 2011–2018	Succeeded by Alan Gilbert
