= Kurt Gudewill =

German musicologist

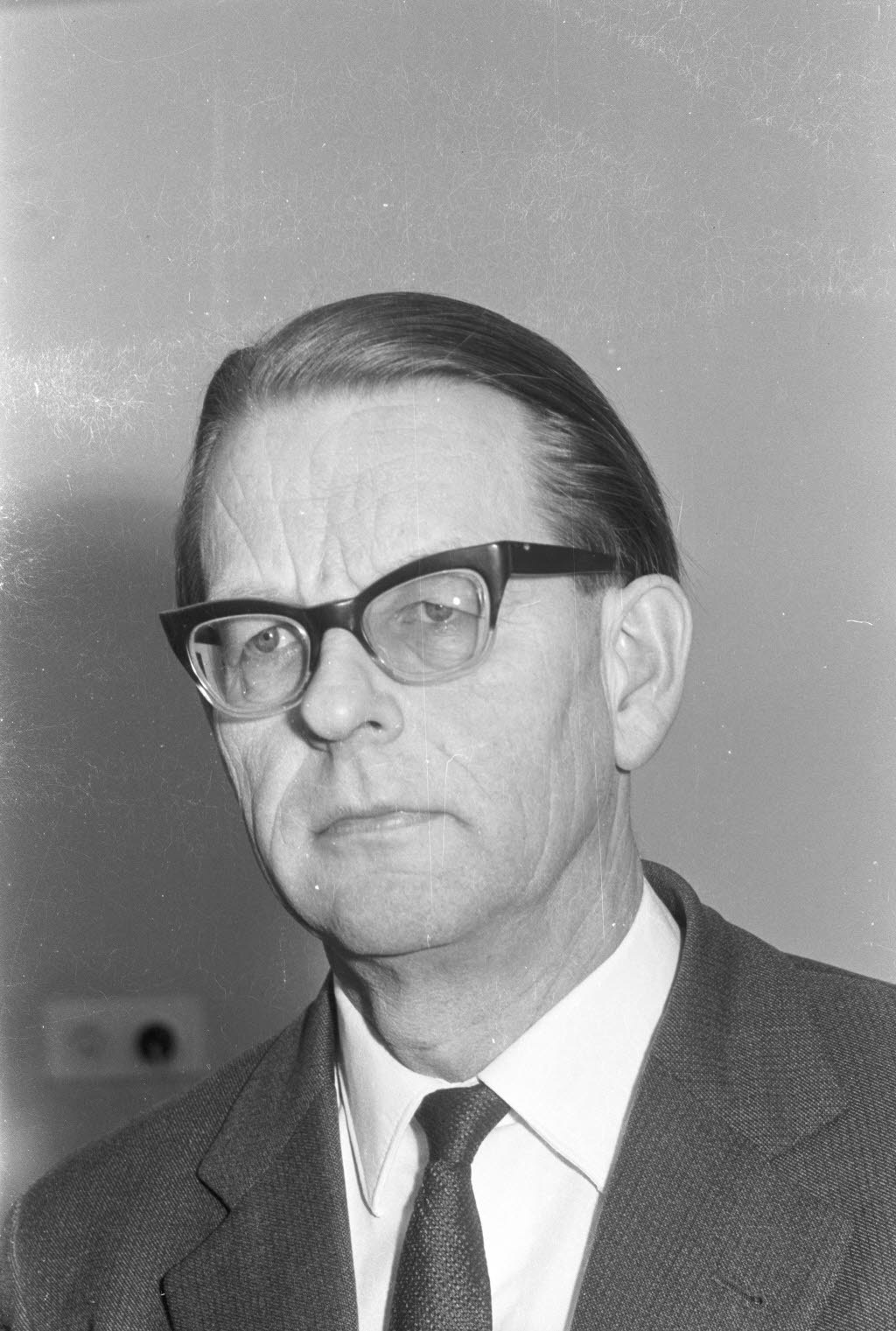
Kurt Gudewill (1966)

Kurt Gudewill (3 February 1911 – 29 July 1995) was a German musicologist and University lecturer. From 1952 to 1976 he was professor at the musicological institute of the Christian-Albrechts-University of Kiel. He rendered outstanding services to Heinrich Schütz and Lied research.

== Life ==
=== Birth and youth in Itzehoe ===
Born in Itzehoe, Gudewill came from a Prussian officer family. So was his uncle, Corvette Captain Hans Gudewill (1866–1904), commander of the German gunboat SMS Habicht and temporary commander of the Schutztruppen in German East Africa. Pictorial material and an overview of the military career of his elder corvette captain, Lieutenant Colonel Max Hans August Gudewill (born in 1865) are handed down in the photo collection of the officers of the XIV Corps (German Empire) of the department Generallandesarchiv Karlsruhe of the Landesarchiv Baden-Württemberg.

As the son of Major Curt Caspar Adolf Gudewill (1868–1914), who was a departmental commander of the field artillery regiment during the first month of World War I and was wounded in the battle of Tienen in Belgium and died four days later, and his wife Margaretha Louise Auguste (1875–1953), née Luther, 1911 in Itzehoe, Province of Schleswig-Holstein, he became the "Luther Side relatives" counted.

Gudewill received his first musical and practical lessons and passed a state private music teacher examination in music theory and musical composition in Itzehoe. As his first music teacher he named Thiel's and Richard Hage's student Heinrich Laubach, who was the founder of the Itzehoe Concert Choir. Furthermore, according to his own statement, his successor, Otto Spreckelsen, exerted musical influence on him. Gudewill attended the Kaiser-Karl-Schule, a reform Realgymnasium in his home town until the Abitur 1929

=== Study and Lectureship in National Socialism ===
From 1929 to 1935 Gudewill studied musicology as well as philosophy and phonetics at the University of Hamburg (among others with Walther Vetter and Wilhelm Heinitz) and 1930/31 at the Humboldt University of Berlin (among others with Arnold Schering, Friedrich Blume and Hans Joachim Moser). In 1935 he was appointed by Walther Vetter in (historical) musicology at the University of Hamburg with a dissertation entitled Das sprachliche Urbild bei Heinrich Schütz und seine Abwandlung nach textbestimmten und musikalischen Gestaltungsgrundsätzen in den Werken bis 1650 to Dr. phil. promoted. The second opinion of the work took over Georg Anschütz. The work was published in 1936 at Bärenreiter-Verlag in Kassel.

In the same year he became a research assistant by Friedrich Blume and a regular lecturer for music at the Musicological Institute in Kiel. In 1944 he habilitated and applied to the Musicological Institute of the Philosophical Faculty of the Christian-Albrechts-Universität zu Kiel on the topic Die Formstrukturen der deutschen Liedtenores des 15. und 16. Jahrhunderts. (The Form Structures of German Lied Tenors of the 15th and 16th Century). Excerpts from his work were presented in the first volume (1948) of the journal Die Musikforschung under the title Zur Frage der Formstrukturen deutscher Liedtenores. Even before the end of the war, in January 1945, he received a Privatdozent (a lecture catalogue did not appear in the summer semester 1945 though).

Gudewill war member Nr. 166.492 of the NSDAP from November 1, 1929, to October 1, 1930 (see Alter Kämpfer) and again from May 1, 1937 (No. 4,782,103). He belonged to the SA (from 1933), the Hitler Youth (from 1940) and the NS-Dozentenbund (from 1942). Through the mediation of a musician colleague of the Semler Chapel in Itzehoe, the military music enthusiastic Gudewill successfully applied around 1933/34 on the place of the second tenor horn in the music course of the Heider SA standard 85 "Dithmarschen". During the Kristallnacht (1938) his was decisively involved in the destruction of the synagogue in Friedrichstadt. Das Machwerk Lexikon der Juden in der Musik, a publication of the Institute for Study of the Jewish Question of 1940, Gudewill commented favourably in a review. After the war, he justified his entry into the SA by saying that it was necessary for his professional advancement. The musicologist Fred K. Prieberg (2009) questioned Gudewill's self-assessment and criticized his silence about re-entering the party.

=== Professor at the University of Kiel after 1945 ===
From the summer semester 1946 Gudewill was again listed as part of the Kiel teaching staff in the "Personal- und Vorlesungsverzeichnis". In 1948/49 he was a scholarship holder of the British Council. Guest lecturer at the University of Birmingham in England. In 1952 he received an extraordinary professorship in Kiel while retaining his music lecturing position, and from 1960 to 1976 he was scientific counselor and Professor of musicology. He supervised several doctoral projects (Wulf Konold, Karl-Heinz Reinfandt, Bernd Sponheuer among others) and a music-making circle for early music. The main focus of his work was historical research on 17th century Lutheran church music, especially on the composers Heinrich Schütz and Melchior Franck, as well as on 16th century German Lied. Thus he had a significant part in the fact that the musical genre "tenor song" could assert itself as term techicus.

In 1957 Gutewill reactivated the Arbeitskreis für Neue Musik, which he led until 1991. In 1959 he was accepted into the student working groups of the Studentenwerk Schleswig-Holstein. The working group continued the "Working Group for New Music" initiated by Hans Hoffmann in 1929, which saw itself as alternative to the absence of a local group of the International Society for New Music. 2003/07 Friedrich Wedell at the Musicological Institute of the University of Kiel revived the network as Forum for Contemporary Music.

Gudewill gave several lectures at the Schleswig-Holsteinische Universitäts-Gesellschaft, the support association of the University of Kiel.

=== Music journalist and Schütz researcher ===
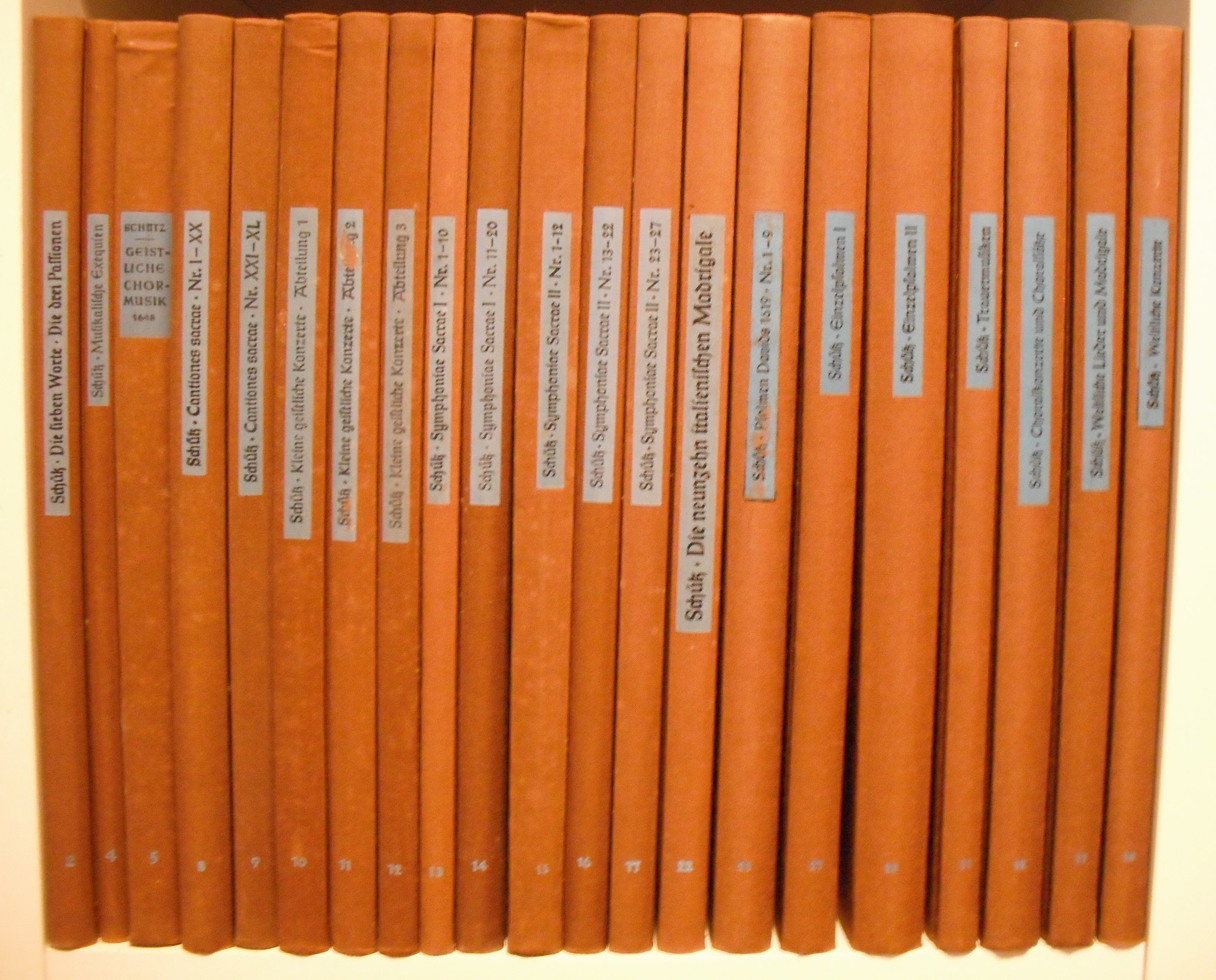
Volumes of the New Schütz Edition

As a reviewer, he published from the 1940s onwards in Deutsche Musikkultur, in Zeitschrift für Musikwissenschaft and in Die Musikforschung. In 1942 he began publishing the five-part anthology Frische teutsche Liedlein by the Renaissance composer Georg Forster. From 1948 on, he contributed to the first edition of the music encyclopaedia Die Musik in Geschichte und Gegenwart (MGG) published by his teacher Blume. Gudewill wrote person and material entries. Among others he contributed the first summarizing essay on the music history of Gottdorf (1965). He was also the author of personal articles in the Neue Deutsche Biographie (NDB) and in the Grove Dictionary of Music and Musicians (New Grove). Together with Blume he founded in 1956 the edition series Das Chorwerk. After Blume's death in 1975 he took over the sole editorship of the series. In 1956 he was commissioned by the Neue Schützgesellschaft to become the editor of the Neue Schütz-Ausgabe (NSA; Heinrich Schütz: Neue Ausgabe sämtlicher Werke). In 1979 he was also significantly involved in the foundation of the Schütz-Jahrbuch.

From 1956 he was vice president and from 1975 to 1988 he succeeded Karl Vötterle. President of the International Heinrich Schütz Society in Kassel. From 1968 to 1981 he was director of the Musikfreunde Kiel

=== Family and estate ===
Gudewill, a Protestant, was married to a pianist and father of three daughters. Alfred Zimmermann, professor of medicine in Kiel, was his father-in-law. His Nachlass can be found in the music collection of the Schleswig-Holsteinische Landesbibliothek in Kiel.

Gudewill died in Kiel at the age of 84.

== Writings ==
- Das sprachliche Urbild bei Heinrich Schütz und seine Abwandlung nach textbestimmten und musikalischen Gestaltungsgrundsätzen in den Werken bis 1650. Bärenreiter-Verlag, Kassel 1936.
- Bekenntnis zu Heinrich Schütz. Bärenreiter-Verlag, Kassel among others 1954 (with Adam Adrio, Wilhelm Ehmann, Hans Joachim Moser and Karl Vötterle).
- Franz Tunder und die nordelbingische Musikkultur seiner Zeit. Kultusverwaltung der Hansestadt Lübeck, Lübeck 1967.
- Geschichte der Christian-Albrechts-Universität, Kiel, 1665–1965. Vol 5: Geschichte der Philosophischen Fakultät. Teilband 1. Wachholtz, Neumünster 1969 (with Peter Rohs, Meinhart Volkamer, Hans-Georg Herrlitz, Wilhelm Kraiker and Hans Tintelnot) – Behandlung der Fächer Musikpflege und Musikwissenschaft.
- Michael Praetorius Creutzbergensis: 1571(?)–1621. Zwei Beiträge zu seinem und seiner Kapelle Jubiläumsjahr. Möseler, Wolfenbüttel among others. 1971 (with Hans Haase).
- Sprachkritik, Sprachmusik, Sprachsalat: Lyrik. (Edition Fischer). R. G. Fischer, Frankfurt 1991, ISBN 3-89406-304-1 (2nd edition 1992).

Editions

- Georg Forster: Frische teutsche Liedlein (1539–1556) (Das Erbe deutscher Musik. Volumes 20 and 60–63). Text author: Wilhelm Heiske (1st part), Hinrich Siuts (2nd part) and Horst Brunner (3.–5. Teil). 5 parts, Möseler, Wolfenbüttel among others 1942, 1969, 1976, 1987 and 1997.
- Melchior Franck: Drei Quodlibets (Das Chorwerk. 53th Issue). Möseler, Wolfenbüttel 1956.
- Zehn weltliche Lieder aus Georg Forster: Frische teutsche Liedlein (Teil 3–5) zu 4, 5 und 8 Stimmen (Das Chorwerk. Issue 63). Möseler, Wolfenbüttel 1957.

Autobiographical works

- Gudewill, Kurt. In Friedrich Blume (ed.): Die Musik in Geschichte und Gegenwart (MGG). First edition, volume 5 (Gesellschaften – Hayne). Bärenreiter/Metzler, Kassel among others 1956, Literature by and about Kurt Gudewill in the German National Library catalogue, p. 1012
- Erinnerungen an die Semlersche Kapelle in Itzehoe und an Musiker aus dem Umkreis der Stadt. In Steinburger Jahrbuch 31 (1987), pp. 286–296.

== Literature ==
- Carl Dahlhaus, Hans Heinrich Eggebrecht (ed.): Riemann Musiklexikon. In vier Bänden und einem Ergänzungsband (Serie Musik Atlantis, Schott. Vol. 8397). Vol. 2: E–K. 3rd edition, Atlantis-Musikbuch-Verlag, Zürich among others 2001, ISBN 3-254-08397-0, p. 156.
- Hans Heinrich Eggebrecht: Gudewill, Kurt. In Stanley Sadie (ed.): The new Grove dictionary of music and musicians. Volume 10: Glinka to Harp. 2nd edition, Macmillan, London among others 2001, ISBN 1-56159-239-0, p. 493.

- Eggebrecht, Hans Heinrich (2001). "Gudewill, Kurt". Grove Music Online (8th ed.). Oxford University Press. doi:10.1093/gmo/9781561592630.article.11914. ISBN 978-1-56159-263-0. (subscription, Wikilibrary access, or UK public library membership required)

- Paul Frank, Wilhelm Altmann, fortgeführt von Burchard Bulling, Florian Noetzel, Helmut Rösner: Kurzgefaßtes Tonkünstlerlexikon. Second part: Ergänzungen und Erweiterungen seit 1937. Volume 1: A–K. 15. Auflage, Heinrichshofen, Wilhelmshaven 1974, ISBN 3-7959-0087-5, p. 257.
- Fred K. Prieberg: Handbuch Deutsche Musiker 1933–1945. 2nd edition, Kopf, Kiel 2009, ISBN 978-3-00-037705-1, p. 2727f. and 8958.
- Heinrich W. Schwab: Kurt Gudewill (1911–1995). In Die Musikforschung 49 (1996) 1, S. 1f.
- Friedrich Volbehr, Richard Weyl: Professoren und Dozenten der Christian-Albrechts-Universität zu Kiel: 1665–1954. Mit Angaben über die sonstigen Lehrkräfte und die Universitäts-Bibliothekare und einem Verzeichnis der Rektoren (Veröffentlichungen der schleswig-holsteinischen Universitätsgesellschaft. N.F., Nr. 7). Edited by Rudolf Bülck, completed by Hans-Joachim Newiger. 4th edition, Hirt, Kiel 1956, p. 201.

Festschrift

- Uwe Haensel (ed.): Beiträge zur Musikgeschichte Nordeuropas: Kurt Gudewill zum 65. Geburtstag. Möseler, Wolfenbüttel among others 1978 (enthält Bibliographie, p. 342–348).
