= Walther Vetter =

German musicologist and music historian

Walther Hermann Vetter (10 May 1891 – 1 April 1967) was a German musicologist. From 1946 to 1958, he was professor at the Humboldt University of Berlin.

== Life ==
Born in Berlin, Vetter, Lutheran, was the son of the Kapellmeister Johannes Vetter (1860–1928), a founding member of the Berlin Philharmonic. In 1897 the family moved to Greiz in the Principality of Reuss-Greiz (today: Thuringia), where the father founded an orchestra. Vetter first attended the Ulf-Merbold-Gymnasium Greiz and then, until the Abitur, the Latina (Old school) of the Francke Foundations in Halle an der Saale. From 1910, he studied musicology, art history and philosophy at the Martin Luther University of Halle-Wittenberg and conducting at the Leipzig Conservatory (with Hans Sitt, Stephan Krehl and Richard Hofmann). In 1914 he passed the conducting examination. During World War I, he served in an army music corps (1914/15) and as an army soldier among others at Hartmannswillerkopf and before Verdun on the Western Front (1915–1918).

He then continued his studies of musicology at the University of Halle. He also studied art history (with Wilhelm Waetzoldt) as well as philosophy and psychology (with Theodor Ziehen and Felix Krueger). From his academic teacher Hermann Abert, he received inspiration for his later research work, which ranged from music of ancient Greece to the composers of the 19th century. In 1920 he was awarded a Dr. phil. at the University of Leipzig with the dissertation Die Arie bei Christoph Willibald Gluck. After his studies, Vetter worked briefly as a music critic for the Hallische Zeitung, in 1921 he changed to a teacher at an adult education centre, music editor of the Danziger Neueste Nachrichten and music advisor to the Senate of the Free City of Danzig. In 1927, he received his habilitation from Max Schneider with the thesis Über Ausgewählte Kapitel aus der Entwicklungsgeschichte und Ästhetik des ein- und mehrstimmigen deutschen Kunstliedes im 17. Jahrhundert at the University of Breslau for Musicology and then received a private lectureship there. In 1928 he was appointed professor and provisional director of the musicological institute in Halle. From 1929, he was lecturer at the University of Hamburg.

Although he initially continued to work after the Machtergreifung by the Nazis, his re-habilitation attempt to Hamburg in 1934 was unsuccessful. In mid-1934, Vetter was offered a non-permanent extraordinary professorship at the University of Breslau, where Arnold Schmitz held the chair at the time. In 1936, Vetter succeeded Hans Engel as head of the musicology department and in 1939 he was appointed as a regular director at the Ernst-Moritz-Arndt-Universität Greifswald. In the course of the appointment process in Berlin, in which he was named third after Friedrich Blume and Rudolf Gerber, the local Gaudozentenbundsführer Willi Willing described him as a "musicologist of medium format". In April 1941 he went to the newly founded occupied Poland and National Socialist-oriented Reichsuniversität Posen, where he received a civil servant extraordinary ordinariate and became director of the Musicological Institute. He probably owed this position to Herman-Walther Frey, speaker on university matters in the Reich Ministry of Science, Education and Culture. For Frey's denazification proceedings in 1947, Vetter then issued his acquaintance with a Persil Certificate. Only at the end of the Second World War, in January 1945, Vetter became the Volkssturm (banns I) have been called up. Most recently he served as clerk of a supply regiment in the Wehrmacht.

Already in December 1933 he publicly admitted his leaning to the Nazis, although he never became a NSDAP party member. The musicologist Hans Huchzermeyer (2012) criticised Vetter for his "National Socialist and anti-Jewish statements" during the Nazi era. His lecture on Folk characteristics in Mozart's operas from 1938 can be taken as an example. Vetter was a member of the National Socialist Teachers League (1 May 1936 to 15 October 1937), in National Socialist Motor Corps. (1939 to 1941) and in National Socialist People's Welfare. Furthermore, until 1941 he was the municipal music commissioner for Greifswald. In 1942 he found himself in the NS-Dozentenbund.

After the end of the war in May 1945, Vetter took up residence in the Soviet Occupation Zone, later the GDR, and in March 1946, after a year-long appointment procedure, was offered the full chair of musicology at the Humboldt University of Berlin, which had been vacant since the death of Arnold Schering in 1941. Vetter's research focused on various genres and epochs of historical musicology. He wrote studies and systematic manuals on ancient music, on Johann Sebastian Bach, Franz Schubert and Christoph Willibald Gluck. He also published encyclopedia articles for the Pauly-Wissowa (from 1927), the Die Musik in Geschichte und Gegenwart (from 1949) and the Neue Deutsche Biographie From 1948 to 1961, he was co-editor of Die Musikforschung, from 1956 to 1966, together with Rudolf Eller. Editor of the German Yearbook of Musicology. From 1948 to 1958, he was vice president and from 1961 honorary member of the Gesellschaft für Musikforschung, from 1950 to 1960, board member of the Verband Deutscher Komponisten und Musikwissenschaftler. He became a member of the German Bach Committee, which was constituted in 1949. In 1950, he took over the direction of the scientific Bach conference in Leipzig. From 1952, he was then a member of the editorial board of the New Bach Edition, remaining until his death. He was also an advisory board for musicology at the Ministry of Higher and Technical Education (East Germany). He retired emeritus in 1958. His academic students included among others Kurt Gudewill (PhD, Hamburg 1935) and Herbert Kelletat (Habilitation, Poznan 1944). From 1949 to 1951 Hans Heinrich Eggebrecht was p. 155. Assistant Vetters in Berlin.

Vetter, who was a member of the Liberal-Democratic Party of Germany, was highly esteemed in his field in the GDR. He thus received the National Prize of the GDR in 1957 III. class for science and technology

In 1950 he caused a controversy with his book Der Kapellmeister Bach. Contrary to the state of the art, he declared Bach's Köthen years to be central to his career. In keeping with the State ideology, he emphasized the secular work of the composer and Thomaskantor at the expense of his Protestant church music. While the party press gave the book a positive reception, Georg Knepler, himself a colleague of Vetter's in Berlin, was certainly critical. In 1952, the West German Bach researcher Friedrich Smend set his work Bach in Köthen against Vetter. Vetter's earlier contribution to the life and work of Johann Sebastian Bach in 1938 was already ideologically exaggerated. At that time, his writing supported those values that were supported by Blood and soil. Eduard Mutschelknauss attested him decidedly ethnic nationalism Elements. Like the monograph of 1950, his Forkel edition Über Johann Sebastian Bachs Leben, Kunst und Kunstwerke (1966ff. ), respectively the afterword, is considered tendentious, which is why research tends to fall back on the original edition of 1802 or the reprint of 2000 published by Claudia Maria Knispel.

Vetter was married and died in 1967 in Berlin-Niederschönhausen at the age of 75. His estate is located in the music department of the Berlin State Library.

== Publications ==
- Die Arie bei Gluck. Leipzig 1920 (Dissertation; printed only in extracts).
- Das frühdeutsche Lied. Ausgewählte Kapitel aus der Entwicklungsgeschichte und Aesthetik des ein- und mehrstimmigen deutschen Kunstliedes im 17. Jahrhundert. 2 volumes. Helios-Verlag, Münster 1928.
- Der humanistische Bildungsgedanke in Musik und Musikwissenschaft. H. Beyer & Söhne, Langensalza 1928.
- Hermann Abert und die Musikwissenschaft an der Universität Halle. Helios-Verlag, Münster 1929 (Vortrag).
- Franz Schubert. Athenaion, Potsdam 1934.
- Antike Musik. Heimeran, Munich 1935.
- Johann Sebastian Bach: Leben und Werk. Breitkopf & Härtel, Leipzig 1938.
- Beethoven und die militärisch-politischen Ereignisse seiner Zeit. Kluge & Ströhm, Posen 1943 (Vortrag).
- Der Kapellmeister Bach. Versuch einer Deutung Bachs auf Grund seines Wirkens als Kapellmeister in Köthen. Athenaion, Potsdam 1950.
- Bericht über die wissenschaftliche Bachtagung der Gesellschaft für Musikforschung: Leipzig 23. bis 26. Juli 1950. Edition Peters, Leipzig 1951 (edited with Ernst Hermann Meyer).
- Der Klassiker Schubert. 2 volume. Peters, Leipzig 1953.
- Festschrift Max Schneider zum achzigsten Geburtstage. Deutscher Verlag für Musik, Leipzig 1955 (ed.).
- Richard Wagner: Pariser Novellen: Ein deutscher Musiker in Paris. 2nd edition, Koehler & Amelang, Leipzig 1961 (ed.).
- Mythos – Melos – Musica. Ausgewählte Aufsätze zur Musikgeschichte. 2 volumes. Leipzig 1957–1961.
- Christoph Willibald Gluck. Ein Essay. VEB Deutscher Verlag für Musik, Leipzig 1964.
- Johann Nikolaus Forkel: Über Johann Sebastian Bachs Leben, Kunst und Kunstwerke. Hoffmeister und Kühnel, Leipzig 1802. [Hg. des Faksmile-Neudrucks: 2nd edition, Henschel, Berlin 1970].

== Literature ==
- Heinz Wegener: Im Dienst der Musikwissenschaft. Walter Vetter 70 Jahre alt. In Der Kirchenmusiker 12 (1961), S. 58f.
- Günter Hausswald: Walther Vetter 70 Jahre. In Musica 15 (1961), p. 393.
- Eberhard Otto: Walther Vetter 75 Jahre. In Musica 20 (1966), p. 137 (with pic.).
- Hansjürgen Schaefer: Walther Vetter 75 Jahre. In Musik und Gesellschaft 16 (1966), S. 330f.
- Heinz Becker: Walther Vetter in memoriam. In Die Musikforschung 20 (1967) 3, pp. 245–247.
- Wolfram Schwinger: Zum Tode von Walther Vetter. In Musica 21 (1967), pp. 129f.
- Friedrich Blume: Walther Vetter in Memoriam. In Acta Musicologica 40 (1968) 1, pp. 3–5.
- Ernst Hermann Meyer: Zum Gedenken Walther Vetters. In Beiträge zur Musikwissenschaft 10 (1968), pp. 209f.
- Institut für Musikwissenschaft der Humboldt-Universität zu Berlin (ed.): Musa, mens, musici: im Gedenken an Walther Vetter. Deutscher Verlag für Musik, VEB, Leipzig 1969 (with a glossed over typeface.)
- Gabriele Baumgartner: Vetter, Walther. In Gabriele Baumgartner, Dieter Hebig (ed.): Biographisches Handbuch der SBZ / DDR 1945–1990. Volume 2: Maassen – Zylla. Saur, Munich among others 1997, ISBN 3-598-11177-0, p. 959.
- Carl Dahlhaus, Hans Heinrich Eggebrecht (ed.): Riemann Musiklexikon. In vier Bänden und einem Ergänzungsband (Serie Musik Atlantis, Schott. vol. 8397). Volume 4 R–Z. 3rd edition, Atlantis-Musikbuch-Verlag, Zürich among others 2001, ISBN 3-254-08399-7, p. 302.
- Burkhard Meischein: "Der erste musikwissenschaftliche Lehrstuhl Deutschlands". Vorgänge um die Nachfolge Arnold Scherings 1941–1946. In Rüdiger vom Bruch (ed.): Die Berliner Universität in der NS-Zeit. Volume 2: Fachbereiche und Fakultäten. Steiner, Stuttgart 2005, ISBN 3-515-08658-7, pp. 165–178.
- Fred K. Prieberg: Handbuch Deutsche Musiker 1933–1945. 2nd edition, Kopf, Kiel 2009, ISBN 978-3-00-037705-1, pp. 7856–7858 and 9841.
- Ernst Klee: Das Kulturlexikon zum Dritten Reich. Wer war was vor und nach 1945 (Die Zeit des Nationalsozialismus. Vol. 17153). Vollständig überarbeitete Ausgabe. Fischer-Taschenbuch-Verlag, Frankfurt 2009, ISBN 978-3-596-17153-8, p. 568.
- Henrik Eberle: Ein wertvolles Instrument. Die Universität Greifswald im Nationalsozialismus. Böhlau Verlag, Köln among others 2015, ISBN 978-3-412-22397-7, p. 22.
- Markus Rathey: A Divided Country–A Divided Bach: The Cantor-Kapellmeister Controversy and The Cold War. In Bach 47 (2016) 2, pp. 1–26.
