= Hans Albrecht (musicologist) =

German musicologist and university lecturer

Joachim Hans Albrecht (31 March 1902 – 20 January 1961) was a German musicologist and university lecturer. He was professor at the Christian-Albrechts-Universität zu Kiel.

== Life ==
Born in Magdeburg, Albrecht was son of Theodor Albrecht (chief engineer) and Klara Emmy Brandt in Magdeburg, Province of Saxony. He spent his childhood and youth in Essen, where he already prepared himself for the music teacher examination during his Gymnasium Borbeck period at the Essener Konservatorium (1911–1921) and completed this in 1921 in the main subject piano. In 1921 he began studying musicology. After one semester at the Westfälische Wilhelms-Universität he moved to the Humboldt-Universität zu Berlin, where he was a student of Johannes Wolf, Hermann Abert, Curt Sachs and Erich Moritz von Hornbostel. In 1925 Albrecht was awarded the title of Dr. phil. "composer" by Johannes Wolf at the Philosophical Faculty in Berlin with a dissertation on the performance practice of Italian music of the 14th century.

After the Seizure of control of National Socialism, he joined the National Socialist German Workers' Party on 1 April 1933. (No. 1,691,130). From 1 June 1933 to 1 January 1934 he was Blockleiter and local group culture warden. 1934 he became leader of the Landesmusikerschaft Rheinland of the Reichsmusikkammer. From November 1935 to 1937 he was regional director of the Reichsmusikkammer im Gau Köln-Aachen. Heinz Drewes, whom he knew from his time as a student in Berlin, brought him to the Reichsministerium für Volksaufklärung und Propaganda in 1937, where he was a consultant in Department X (music) until 1939. Still mentioned in 2007 in the Kulturlexikon zum Dritten Reich, Ernst Klee waived Albrecht's inclusion in the completely revised edition of 2009.

Until 1937 Albrecht held several teaching positions at music schools, among other at the Witte Conservatory Essen (1925–1933), at the Sievert Conservatory Wuppertal (1925–1935) and at the Folkwang School Food (1933–1937). He was also a member of the Deutsche Bühnenkorrespondenz. He also organized music festivals in Bremen (1929), Essen (1931) and Aachen (1933). For the Reichsverband Deutscher Tonkünstler he co-designed the Rheinische Musikfeste.

A habilitation was initially not possible for him, since the musicological institutes in University of Cologne and the Rheinische Friedrich-Wilhelms-Universität Bonn had no free chair. In 1939 he joined the State Institute for Music Research in Berlin as a research assistant (until 1941). On 1 October 1940 he was appointed professor there despite being barred from the title. On 4 June 1942 he was habilitated at the Christian-Albrechts-Universität zu Kiel with a thesis on the life and work of Caspar Othmayr. The habilitation thesis was published in 1950 by Bärenreiter-Verlag in Kassel. He followed Max Seiffert in 1941, after his emeritus, as provisional director of the State Institute for German Music Research. In 1942/43 he was also a representative of musicology in the Senate of the Prussian Academy of Arts in Berlin. When the institute was closed at the end of 1944, Albrecht retired from this position. He took care of the inventory of subdivision 3 (instrument museum) at Seifertdorf castle near Liegnitz in Silesia. In February 1945 he was called up for military service.

After 1945 he was classified as "exonerated" within the framework of the denazification. In 1947 he joined the musicological institute of the Christian-Albrechts-University Kiel as private lecturer in Kiel, where he taught until his death. He worked as an expert for the Deutsche Forschungsgemeinschaft. His research interests included the late 15th and early 16th century (Renaissance music).

From 1954 to 1959 he worked as a research assistant at the German Music Historical Archive in Kassel, which was supervised by the Music Historical Commission. From 1953 to 1959 he was the director of Das Erbe deutscher Musik series. In 1946 he co-founded the Gesellschaft für Musikforschung. From 1948 to 1960 he was editor of the organ Die Musikforschung and from 1958 to 1961 the Acta Musicologica of the International Musicological Society. He was also chairman of the reaction committee of the facsimile series Documenta Musicologia. He headed the Kiel State Institute for Music Research from 1947 to 1961. In 1953 he re-founded the Institute's series of publications. From 1949 he continued Max Seiffert's collection Organum. From 1951 to 1961 he also worked as director of the Johann-Sebastian-Bach-Institut at the Georg-August-Universität Göttingen. He was a close advisor Friedrich Blume and from 1947 to 1958 belonged to the editors of the encyclopaedia Die Musik in Geschichte und Gegenwart.

Albrecht, a Protestant, was married and father of two children. His son Gerd Albrecht (1935–2014) was conductor. He died in Kiel at age 58.

== Publications ==
- Caspar Othmayr: Leben und Werk. Bärenreiter-Verlag, Kassel/Basel 1950.
- Die Bedeutung der Zeichen Keil, Strich und Punkt bei Mozart: 5 Lösungen einer Preisfrage (Musikwissenschaftliche Arbeiten. No. 10). Bärenreiter-Verlag, Kassel/Basel/London 1957 (hg. im Auftrag der Gesellschaft für Musikforschung).

Autobiography:

- Friedrich Blume: Die Musik in Geschichte und Gegenwart on MGG1
