= Arno Forchert =

German musicologist (1925–2011)

Arno Forchert (29 December 1925 – 11 March 2011) was a German musicologist.

== Life ==
=== Research career ===
Born in Berlin, Forchert studied music (majoring in piano) and then musicology at the Free University of Berlin from 1947 to 1950, where he gained his doctorate in 1957 with a thesis on the late work of Michael Praetorius. From 1956 to 1960, he directed the music teachers' seminar at the John Petersen Conservatory in Berlin-Zehlendorf, and from 1960 he worked as a lecturer for historical musicology at the Spandauer Kirchenmusikschule. From 1959 Forchert was a research assistant at the musicological institute of the Free University of Berlin, where he habilitated in 1967 and taught until 1978. In 1971 he followed a call to the Hochschule für Musik Detmold for a position as full professor of musicology. There he founded the Musikwissenschaftliches Seminar Detmold/Paderborn in 1977, which he directed until his retirement in 1991. In 1981 he moved to the Paderborn University to transform the Musicology Department in Detmold into a joint institution of the University of Paderborn and the Hochschule für Musik Detmold. From 1988 to 1997 he was president of the International Heinrich Schütz Society, which appointed him an honorary member. On his 60th birthday a commemorative publication edited by Gerhard Allroggen and Detlef Altenburg was published. Forchert died on 11 March 2011 at his home in Detmold at age 85.

=== Other activities ===
- 1950–1970 Freier Mitarbeiter am Rundfunk im amerikanischen Sektor Berlin.
- 1958–1963 Programmeinführung for the concerts of the Berlin Philharmonic.
- 1964–1972 employee of the magazine "Phono-Forum" and member of the jury of the Deutscher Schallplattenpreis.
- 1976–1981 Chairman of the section musicology and music education of the Gesellschaft für Musikforschung.
- 1981–1988 Advisory at the board music of the Goethe-Institut Munich.
- 1983–1985 dean and vice dean of department 4 of the Paderborn University
- 1984–1988 Reviewer for musicology and deputy chairman of the expert committee for art studies of the Deutsche Forschungsgemeinschaft.
- 1985–1989 Member of the board of the Gesellschaft für Musikforschung.
- 1994–1998 advisory board for music of the 17th century of the Musiklexikon Musik in Geschichte und Gegenwart.

=== Private life ===
Forchert was married twice. His first marriage produced two sons. His first wife died before him. His second marriage lasted until his death.

== Writings ==
=== Books ===
- Das Spätwerk des Michael Praetorius. Italienische und deutsche Stilbegegnung. (Berliner Studien zur Musikwissenschaft vol. 1), Berlin 1959.
- Studien zum Musikverständnis im frühen 19. Jahrhundert. Voraussetzungen und Aspekte der zeitgenössischen Deutung instr. Musikwerke, Habilitationsschrift Berlin 1967.
- Johann Sebastian Bach und seine Zeit, Laaber 2000.

=== Essays ===
==== Michael Praetorius ====
- Michael Praetorius – Werk und Wirkung, Sagittarius 4, Kassel 1973, pp. 98–110.
- Michael Praetorius und die Musik am Hof von Wolfenbüttel; Daphnis 10, 1981, pp. 625–642.
- Musik zwischen Religion und Politik. Bemerkungen zur Biographie des Michael Praetorius; Festschrift for Martin Ruhnke, Neuhausen-Stuttgart 1985, pp. 104–125.

==== Heinrich Schütz ====
- Heinrich Schütz als Komponist evangelischer Kirchenliedtexte; Schütz-Jahrbuch 1982/83, pp. 57–67.
- Heinrich Schütz und die musica poetica, Schütz-Jahrbuch 1993, pp. 7–23.
- Zur Geschichte der Heinrich-Schütz-Gesellschaft; Schütz-Jahrbuch 1996, pp. 7–24.
- Überlegungen zum Einfluss Italiens auf die deutsche Musik um 1600: Voraussetzungen und Bedingungen; Aneignung durch Verwandlung. Aufsätze zur deutschen Musik und Architektur des 16. und 17. Jahrhunderts, ed. by W. Steude, Regensburg 1998, pp. 135–147.
- Zwischen Schütz und Bach: Theaterstil und Kirchenmusik; Europäische Musikgeschichte, ed. by S. Ehrmann, L. Finscher, G. Schubert, Kassel 2002, vol. 1, pp. 377–405.

==== Johann Sebastian Bach ====
- Johann Sebastian Bachs Verhältnis zur Tradition; 51. Bachfest der Neuen Bachgesellschaft, Berlin (West) from 25 to 30 August 1976. Programme book, pp. 15–16.
- Von Bach zu Mendelssohn; Bachtage Berlin, ed. by G. Wagner, Neuhausen-Stuttgart 1985, pp. 211–223.
- Bach und die Tradition der Rhetorik; Alte Musik als ästhetische Gegenwart, Kongressbericht Stuttgart 1985, ed. by Dietrich Berke and D. Hahnemann, vol. 1, Kassel 1987, pp. 169–178.
- "Die Hauptstadt von Sebastian Bach". Berliner Bach-Traditionen zwischen Klassik und Romantik; JbSIMPK 1995, pp. 9–28.
- Bachs Textbehandlung und ihr Verhältnis zur Kompositionslehre seiner Zeit; Wege zu Bach, II. Folge, Societas Bach internationalis, Stuttgart 1995, pp. 24–32.

==== Ludwig van Beethoven ====
- Scherings Beethovendeutung und ihre methodischen Voraussetzungen; Beiträge zur musikalischen Hermeneutik, ed. by Carl Dahlhaus, Regensburg 1975, pp. 41–52; reprinted in Ludwig van Beethoven, ed. by Ludwig Finscher, Darmstadt 1983, p. 19–35.
- Zur Satztechnik von Beethovens Streichquartetten; Festschrift for Heinrich Hüschen, ed. by Detlef Altenburg, Cologne 1980, pp. 151–158.
- Die Darstellung der Melancholie in Beethovens op. 18, 6; Ludwig van Beethoven, ed. by Ludwig Finscher, Darmstadt 1983, pp. 212–239.
- Beethoven, 2. Klavierkonzert B-Dur op. 19, Symphonie C-Dur op. 21; Beethoven. Interpretationen seiner Werke, ed. by Albrecht Riethmüller, C. Dahlhaus, A. L. Ringer, vol. 1, Regensburg 1994, pp. 151–160 and pp. 170–184.
- Beethovens "Pathetique". Vorgänger und Nachfolger; Festschrift for Friedhelm Krummacher, ed. by Siegfried Oechsle, Bernd Sponheuer, Helmut Well, Kassel 2001, pp. 169–180.

==== Gustav Mahler and Richard Strauss ====
- Zur Auflösung traditioneller Formkategorien in der Musik um 1900: Probleme formaler Organisation bei Mahler und Strauss. In Archiv für Musikwissenschaft. 32, 1975, pp. 85–98; Translation into Spanish: Quodlibet 9, 1997, pp. 24–37.
- Techniken motivisch-thematischer Arbeit in Werken von Strauss und Mahler. In C. Floros, H. J. Marx, P. Petersen (ed.): Zur Musikgeschichte des 19. Jahrhunderts. Hamburg 1977, pp. 187–200.
- R. Stephan (ed.): Mahler und Schumann. Mahler-Interpretationen. Mainz 1985, pp. 45–61.

==== Writings on music theory ====
- Ein Traktat über die Modi musici vom Jahre 1652; Festschrift für Bruno Stäblein, ed. by Martin Ruhnke, Kassel 1967, pp. 57–63.
- Französische Autoren in den Schriften Johann Matthesons; Festschrift for Heinz Becker, ed. by J. Schläder and R. Quandt, Regensburg 1982, pp. 382–391.
- Mattheson und die Kirchenmusik; Gattung und Werk in der Musikgeschichte Norddeutschlands und Skandinaviens, ed. by F. Krummacher and H.W. Schwab, Kassel 1982, pp. 114–122.
- Polemik als Erkenntnisform: Bemerkungen zu den Schriften Matthesons; New Mattheson Studies, ed. by G.J. Buelow und H.J. Marx, Cambridge 1983, pp. 199–212.
- Musik und Rhetorik im Barock; Schütz-Jahrbuch 1985/86, pp. 5–21.
- Vom Ausdruck der Empfindung in der Musik; Festschrift for Carl Dahlhaus, ed. by H. Danuser, H. de la Motte-Haber, S. Leopold, N. Miller, Regensburg 1988, pp. 39–50.
- Madrigalismus und musikalisch-rhetorische Figur; in Festschrift for Klaus Wolfgang Niemöller, ed. by J.P. Fricke, Regensburg 1989, pp. 151–169.
- "Ästhetischer" Eindruck und kompositionstechnische Analyse. Zwei Ebenen musikalischer Rezeption in der ersten Hälfte des 19. Jahrhunderts; Rezeptionsästhetik und Rezeptionsgeschichte in der Musikwissenschaft, ed. by H. Danuser and F. Krummacher, Regensburg 1991, pp. 193–203.
- Die italienische Motette am Anfang des 17. Jahrhunderts; Die Motette. Beiträge zu ihrer Gattungsgeschichte, ed. by H. Schneider, Mainz 1991, pp. 205–215.

==== Other ====
- Bemerkungen zum Schaffen Alexander Skrjabins. Ordnung und Ausdruck an den Grenzen der Tonalität; Festschrift for Pepping, ed. by H. Poos, Berlin 1971.
- Textanlage und Darstellungsprinzipien in Mendelssohns Elias; Das Problem Mendelssohn, ed. by Carl Dahlhaus, Regensburg 1974, pp. 61–77.
- "Klassisch" und "romantisch" in der Musikliteratur des frühen 19. Jahrhunderts; Musikforschung 31, 1978, pp. 405–425.
- Adolf Bernhard Marx und seine Berliner Allgemeine musikalische Zeitung; Studien zur Musikgeschichte Berlins im frühen 19. Jahrhundert, ed. by Carl Dahlhaus, Regensburg 1980, pp. 381–404.
- Moderne Züge in der Kammermusik aus Regers Wiesbadener Zeit; Reger-Studien 3, Analysen und Quellenstudien, Wiesbaden 1988, pp. 11–24.
- Droysen und Wagner. Zum Konzept des musikalischen Dramas; Festschrift for Rudolf Stephan, ed. by Josef Kuckertz, H. de la Motte-Haber, C.M. Schmidt, W. Seidel, Regensburg 1990, pp. 251–257.
- Schumanns Spätwerk in der wissenschaftlichen Diskussion; Schumann in Düsseldorf, hrsg. von B.R. Appel, Mainz 1993, pp. 7–23.

=== Publisher ===
- Neue Ausgabe sämtlicher Werke von Johann Hermann Schein.
- Detmold-Paderborner Beiträge zur Musikwissenschaft (since 1989).
- Neuausgabe des Faksimile-Reprints des Syntagma musicum von Michael Praetorius (Kassel 2001).
