= Richard Baum (musicologist) =

German musicologist and music historian

Richard Hellmuth Baum (8 April 1902 – 6 September 2000) was a German musicologist and music historian.

== Life ==
=== Family and education ===
Born in Esslingen am Neckar, Baum, son of the trader Wilhelm Baum and his wife Klara, née Schweitzer, was baptized Protestant and passed his Abitur at the Realgymnasium in Esslingen am Neckar in 1920. He then devoted himself to the study of literary criticism at the University of Tübingen, in 1921, he transferred to the Ludwig-Maximilians-Universität München, where he studied musicology with Adolf Sandberger, literature and education, and in 1926, he received his Dr. phil. doctorate.

Baum married to Margarete née Burrey in 1936. One child was born of this union. He died in September 2000 at the age of 98 in Kassel.

=== Career ===
Immediately after his doctorate, Baum took up the post as the first editor at the Augsburg Bärenreiter-Verlag, which moved to Kassel in 1927. He later became a literary editor and worked for this publishing house until his ceremonial retirement in 1971. From 1933 to 1977, Baum served as the first chairman of the Arbeitskreis für Hausmusik (AfH), since 1969 the International Arbeitskreis für Musik (IAM). In this function, he was responsible for the Kasseler Musiktage, which took place annually from 1933 to 1937 and since 1950. Baum was editor-in-chief of the magazines Musik und Kirche (1929-1941) and Hausmusik (since 1933, later Practica). From 1962 to 1977, he was co-editor of the magazine Musica.

Baum, whose commitment was directed towards several committees of musical youth and adult education, also served as treasurer of the Gesellschaft für Musikforschung from 1947 to 1977 and as first chairman of the Landgraf Moritz Foundation from 1955 to 1975. In recognition of his special services to music research, he was awarded the Plaque of Honour of the City of Kassel in 1962 and the Goethe-Plakette des Landes Hessen in 1976.

== Publications ==
Author

- Joseph Wölfl (1773-1812); Leben, Klavierwerke, Klavierkammermusik und Klavierkonzerte. Dissertation, Ludwig-Maximilians-Universität München 1926, Bärenreiter-Verlag, Kassel, 1928

Editor

- Geselliges Chorbuch. Lieder und Singradel in einfachen Sätzen für gemischten Chor.. Bärenreiter-Verlag, Kassel, 1938
- Johann Erasmus Kindermann (Author): Tanzstücke für Klavier "(Cembalo, Clavichord oder andere Tasteninstrumente)". in Hortus Musicus, 61, Bärenreiter-Verlag, Kassel, 1950
- Alte Weihnachtsmusik für Klavier, Orgel und andere Tasteninstrumente. Choralvorspiele alter Meister, von Advent bis Neujahr. Bärenreiter-Verlag, Kassel, 1953.
- together with Hermann Peter Gericke: Bruder Singer : Lieder unseres Volkes. Bärenreiter-Verlag, Kassel, 1954
- together with Wilhelm Ehmann: Carmina nova; zeitgenössische Chormusik für gemischte Stimmen. Bärenreiter-Verlag, Kassel, 1961
- Das Quempas-Buch: Hausmusikausgabe : Lieder für den Weihnachtsfestkreis. Bärenreiter-Verlag, Kassel, 1966
- together with Wolfgang Rehm: Musik und Verlag. Karl Vötterle zum 65. Geburtstag am 12. April 1968. Bärenreiter-Verlag, Kassel, New York, 1968

== Literature ==
- August Ludwig Degener, Walter Habel: Wer ist wer? the German Who's Who, Band 16., Arani, Berlin, 1970 ISBN 3-7605-2007-3, p. 51.
- Friedrich Blume (ed.): Die Musik in Geschichte und Gegenwart: allgemeine Enzyklopädie der Musik, volume 15. Bärenreiter-Verlag, Kassel, 1973 ISBN 3-7618-0410-5, p. 569.
- Lutz Hagestedt (ed.): Deutsches Literatur-Lexikon. Das 20. Jahrhundert. Band 2 Bauer-Ose – Björnson. Bern, Munich, 2001 (2nd edition) ISBN 3-908255-02-3, p. 1963.
- Rudolf Vierhaus (ed.) Deutsche Biographische Enzyklopädie (DBE): Volume 1: Aachen – Braniß. De Gruyter, Munich, 2005 ISBN 3-1118-4343-2, p. 419.
