= Daniel Friderici =

German cantor, conductor, and composer

Daniel Friderici (1584 – 23 September 1638) was a German cantor, conductor, and composer.

== Life ==
Friderici was born in Eichstaedt (today Querfurt) to a poor family and had been a choirboy in his younger years. He was trained by Valentin Haussmann and Frederick Weissensee. In 1612 he enrolled at the University of Rostock. Two years later he was appointed as a cantor for Oldenburg by Count Anton Günther and later moved in 1618 to the same position at the St. Mary's Church in Rostock. After he had finished his training, he was appointed conductor of all churches in Rostock. There he worked until he died there in 1638 from the plague.

== Works ==
He wrote many high quality secular and sacred polyphonic vocal works, which became widely known in his lifetime and afterwards. He wrote Musica figuralis which taught techniques of singing.

=== Sacred works ===
- Sertum Musicale primum oder Erstes Musicalisches Kräntzlein. 1614
- Sertum musicale alterum oder Anderes Musicalisches Kräntzlein. 1619
- Psalmus Regii Prophetae Davidis. 1622
- Bicinia sacra. 1623
- Viridarium Musicum Sacrum. 1625
- Selige Grab- und Himmels Leiter von sieben Spalten. 1628
- Deliciae iuveniles. 1630

=== Secular works ===
- Servia musicalis prima. 1614
- Servia musicalis altera. 1617
- Newes gantz lustiges und kurtzweiliges Quodlibet. 1622
- Newe Avisen 1635
- Amores musicales oder newe gantz lustige und anmutige weltl. Liedlein. 1624
- Honores musicales oder newe gantz lustige Ehrenliedlein. 1624
- Amuletum musicum contra melancholiam. 1627
- Hilarodicon das ist: Gantz artige und sehr lustige newe Vinetten oder Wein Liederlein. 1632
- Amores musicales oder newe gantz lustige Amorosische Liedlein. 1633.

=== Writings ===
- Musica figuralis oder newe Unterweisung der Singe Kunst. Rostock 1618.

== Bibliography ==
=== Modern editions ===
- Florian Grampp (Hrsg.): Deutsche Gesangstraktate des 17. Jahrhunderts. Bärenreiter, Kassel 2006, ISBN 3-7618-1754-1. (Faksimile von Fridericis Musica figuralis zusammen mit Johann Andreas Herbst: Musica Moderna Prattica und Johann Crüger: Musicae practicae praecepta brevia.)

=== Further reading ===
- Martin Ruhnke Friderici, Daniel. In: Friedrich Blume (ed.): Die Musik in Geschichte und Gegenwart. 1. Ausgabe. Band 4. Bärenreiter, Kassel 1955, Sp. 937–942.
- Andreas Waczkat: Friderici, Friedrich, Fridrich, Daniel. In: Ludwig Finscher (ed.): Die Musik in Geschichte und Gegenwart. 2. Ausgabe. Personenteil. Band 7: Fra - Gre. Bärenreiter, Kassel/Metzler, Stuttgart 2002, ISBN 3-7618-1117-9, Sp. 120–122.
