= New Bach Edition =

Complete edition of Bach's music, published by Bärenreiter

Neue Bach-Ausgabe New Bach Edition
- Edited by: Johann Sebastian Bach Institute, Göttingen; Bach Archive, Leipzig
- Original title: Johann Sebastian Bach: Neue Ausgabe sämtlicher Werke
- Language: German
- Discipline: Critical music edition
- Publisher: Bärenreiter
- Published: 1954–2007
- No. of books: 69
- Website: www.baerenreiter.com/en/catalogue/complete-editions/bach-johann-sebastian/nba/

The New Bach Edition (NBE) (German: Neue Bach-Ausgabe; NBA), is the second complete edition of the music of Johann Sebastian Bach, published by Bärenreiter. The name is short for Johann Sebastian Bach (1685–1750): New Edition of the Complete Works (Johann Sebastian Bach (1685–1750): Neue Ausgabe sämtlicher Werke). It is a historical-critical edition (German: historisch-kritische Ausgabe) of Bach's complete works by the Johann Sebastian Bach Institute (Johann-Sebastian-Bach-Institut) in Göttingen and the Bach Archive (Bach-Archiv) in Leipzig,

When Bach died most of his work was unpublished. The first complete edition of Bach's music was published in the second half of the nineteenth century by the Bach Gesellschaft (Bach-Gesellschaft Ausgabe, BGA). The second complete edition includes some discoveries made since 1900, but there are relatively few such scores. The significance of the NBE lies more in its incorporation of the latest scholarship. Although the NBE is an urtext edition rather than a facsimile edition, it includes many facsimiles of Bach manuscripts.

== History ==
In 1950, the commemorations of the bicentennial of Bach's death in Göttingen and Leipzig led to the initiative to publish his complete works in a critical scientific edition. Musicologists such as Friedrich Blume, Max Schneider, Friedrich Smend and Heinrich Besseler, and sponsors such as Bernhard Sprengel and Otto Benecke made the project possible, supported by the editor Karl Vötterle.

The Neue Bachgesellschaft recommended to pursue the project as a joint venture of musicologists in Göttingen, then West Germany, and Leipzig, then East Germany, in order to stress that the common cultural heritage was indivisible. The Bach Archive and the Johann Sebastian Bach Institute collaborated, their directors Werner Neumann and Alfred Dürr made the new edition their life's project. The publishers were Bärenreiter in Kassel, chosen in 1951 by the Federal Government, and from 1954 the Deutscher Verlag für Musik, a new publisher in Leipzig which was involved until the unification of Germany.

Initially the duration of the edition was estimated as 15 to 20 years, but the scientific work with the sources required much more time than anticipated. The first volumes appeared in 1954. The director in Göttingen, from 1962 to 1963, was Georg von Dadelsen. The edition was completed in June 2007.

== Content ==
The edition contains in eight series over 100 volumes of scores (Notenbände), each Score (Partitur) volume complemented with a Critical Commentary (Kritischer Bericht) volume. The ninth series contains Addenda (7 volumes), and furthermore there is a Supplement of 9 volumes (Supplementbände):

1. Cantatas (47 volumes)
2. Masses, Passions, Oratorios (12 volumes)
3. Motets, Chorales, Lieder (4 volumes)
4. Organ Works (11 volumes)
5. Keyboard and Lute Works (14 volumes)
6. Chamber Music (5 volumes)
7. Orchestral Works (7 volumes)
8. Canons, Musical Offering, Art of Fugue (3 volumes)
9. Addenda (approximately 7 volumes)

Supplement: Bach Documents (9 volumes)

Each Score volume contains a preface and a selection of facsimiles of its sources. In the Score volumes variants and fragments of compositions are published along with complete works. The Critical Commentary volumes describe the history and sources (manuscript sources, early editions), and their interdependence, for each composition, and discuss editorial issues.

== Relevance ==
The New Bach Edition presents a reliable version of Bach's music for both scholars and performers. Its strict philological methods were exemplary for critical scientific editions in the second half of the 20th century.

In preparation for the NBE, lost compositions were found, whereas some known compositions proved to be not Bach's works. The examination of the sources corrected the chronology of his compositions.

The second revised edition of the Bach-Werke-Verzeichnis, and the Bach-Digital website refer to the NBE volume and page number for every listed composition by Bach. In addition to listing the page number of the score, the Bach Digital website also mentions the page number where the composition is discussed in the corresponding Critical Commentary volume.

== Revision ==
In February 2010 the Bach Archive and the publisher announced a revision of single volumes, in order to include new sources and findings. The first in this series of revisions was the Mass in B minor (updating the second volume of the NBE). Approximately 15 more volumes are planned, including Weimar cantatas (five works), the St John Passion, the motets, the violin sonatas, the cello suites and others.

== Awards ==
In 2001 the German Association of Music Publishers (Deutscher Musikverlegerverband) awarded a special prize to the New Bach Edition in recognition of editorial achievement.

== Sources ==
- Uwe Wolf (editor); Contributions by Georg von Dadelsen, Alfred Dürr, Hans-Joachim Schulze, Frieder Zschoch and others. Die Neue Bach-Ausgabe 1954–2007: Eine Dokumentation. Bärenreiter, 2007.
