= Anna Amalia =

Anna Amalia or Amalie may refer to:

- Anna Amalie of Baden-Durlach, Countess of Nassau-Saarbrücken (1595–1651), regent of Nassau-Saarbrücken, 1640–1651
- Anna Amalia, Abbess of Quedlinburg (1723–1787), Princess-Abbess of Quedlinburg and composer
- Duchess Anna Amalia of Brunswick-Wolfenbüttel (1739–1807), German composer and patron of the arts

== See also ==
- Duchess Anna Amalia Library, in Weimar
- Anna Amalie Abert (1906–1996), German musicologist
- Anna Amelia Obermeyer (1907–2001), South African botanist
