= Herbert Kelletat =

German classical organist

Herbert Kelletat (13 October 1907 – 25 May 2007) was a German musician, organist, author of musicological works and choir director. Since 1930, he published scholarly papers, especially on the history of the organ and on matters of musical tuning.

== Life ==
Born in Saalfeld, Kreis Mohrungen, Kelletat experienced his early childhood in Graudenz (West Prussia) and in Liebstadt (East Prussia). Later the family lived in Bromberg (1917-1921) and in Halle (1921-1930). Kelletat began studying German, English and musicology at Friedrichs-University Halle in 1926. Although his parents moved to Marienburg (West Prussia), he initially stayed in Halle and later changed to study at the Albertus-Universität Königsberg. There, from 1930 to 1934, he extended his studies of musicology with Joseph Müller-Blattau and organ playing with Adolf Wieber. On the occasion of a trip to the Baltic States in 1932 he met Monika Hunnius in Riga.

Kelletat received his doctorate in 1933 with the dissertation Zur Geschichte der deutschen Orgelmusik in der Frühklassik and became assistant to Müller-Blattau. From 1934 on, Kelletat continued his studies (organ playing and improvisation) at the Kirchenmusikschule in Berlin-Spandau with Gerhard Schwarz, Herbert Schulze and Ernst Pepping. In the same year, he married Margarete Nominikat. Kelletat also wrote music reviews for the Preußische Zeitung. He continued his organ studies with Karl Matthaei in Winterthur. From 1935 to 1944, he worked for almost ten years as cantor and organist at the Altstädtische Kirche.

In 1944, he completed his habilitation with Walther Vetter on the history of the organ in East and West Prussia and was awarded the title of professor. In 1946, he founded the Rostock Academy of Music, but fled to West Berlin in the same year and began teaching at the Academy of Music. From 1948 to 1951, Kelletat was cantor and organist in Soest and founded the Evangelische Studentenkantorei Deutschlands in 1948. For over 20 years, from 1951 to 1972, Kelletat was then organist and cantor of the church at Hohenzollernplatz in Wilmersdorf. During this time, he was the state church music director for Berlin from 1952 and founded the Berliner Kantorei in 1953.

In 1980, after the death of his wife Margarete, he moved to Bad Salzuflen and married Hedwig Bülow. In 2002, Kelletat moved to Flensburg to the Gotthard-und-Anna-Hansen-Stift of the DIAKO (Diakonische Anstalten). In 2004, he wrote his work Mein Weg zur Musica Sacra, which was published in Flensburg in 2005.

Kelletat last lived in Flensburg and was engaged in musicological work until his death there at the age of 99.

== Publications ==
- Zur musikalischen Temperatur insbesondere bei Johann Sebastian Bach. Oncken, Kassel 1960.
- Zur Geschichte der deutschen Orgelmusik in der Frühklassik. Bärenreiter, Kassel 1933.
- Zur musikalischen Temperatur, Band I, Johann Sebastian Bach uns seine Zeit. (1981, Merseburger ISBN 3-87537-156-9) Merseburger, Berlin
- Zur musikalischen Temperatur, Band II, Wiener Klassik. (1982, Merseburger ISBN 3-87537-187-9)
- Zur musikalischen Temperatur, Band III, Franz Schubert. (1994, Merseburger ISBN 3-87537-239-5)
- Improvisationslehre für Orgel. Merseburger, Berlin 1976.
