= Karl-Heinz Reinfandt =

German musicologist (1932–2023)

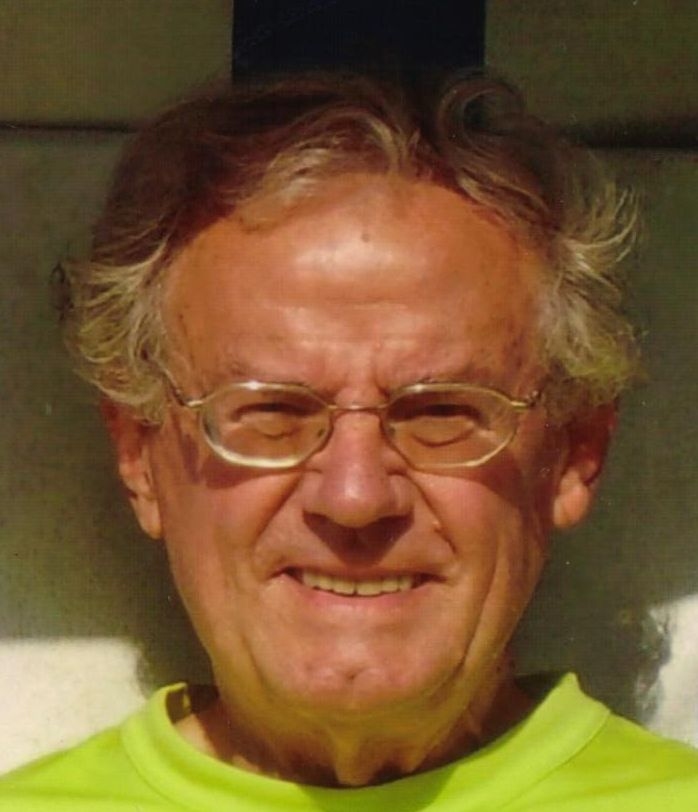

Karl-Heinz Reinfandt (7 July 1932 – 20 March 2023) was a German musicologist and music educator.

== Life ==
Born in Danzig, Reinfandt studied music and the German language from 1953 to 1955 at the University of Flensburg. He then worked at various primary and secondary schools as well as secondary modern schools in Schleswig-Holstein. In 1958 he began studying again, this time school and church music at the Hamburg Academy of Music and the subjects musicology, literature and educational science at the universities in Hamburg and Kiel, which he completed in 1966 with a doctorate (Das Verhältnis von Text und Stimmgattung in der deutschen evangelischen Kirchenmusik der Barockzeit (The Relationship between Text and Voice Genre in German Protestant Church Music of the Baroque Period) Supervisor: Kurt Gudewill). From 1963 to 1968, he again served as a student councilor in the teaching profession at various grammar schools in Kiel and Wyk auf Föhr.

At the same time Reinfandt remained closely connected with the Pädagogische Hochschule in Kiel: After he had already held a teaching position for singing from 1963 to 1966, he took up a lectureship for music and its didactics there from 1968 to 1971. In 1971 he was appointed to a professorship for music didactics and musicology at the Christian-Albrechts-Universität zu Kiel. In 1983 he was appointed director of the institute there. After the transition of the Pedagogical University to the Christian-Albrechts-Universität zu Kiel Reinfandt became director of the Institute for Aesthetic Education at the University of Kiel. From 1995 until his Emeritus in 1997, Reinfandt also held visiting scholarship at the Rostock University of Music and Theatre and at the University of Flensburg.

Reinfandt was the father of the Anglicist Christoph Reinfandt.

== Teaching and lecturing activities ==
In addition to teaching and research at the College of Education in Kiel and the University of Kiel, Reinfandt has also been active as a music educator since the 1970s. In the context of family and adult education, he has especially been active in continuing education for adults since his retirement in 1997.

Reinfandt was co-founder of the State Music Council in Schleswig-Holstein and board member of the Arbeitskreis Musik in der Jugend (AMJ). In addition, since the 1970s, he has distinguished himself through his intensive work as choir and orchestra conductor (German-Scandinavian Music Weeks in Schleswig-Holstein; Europa Cantat) as well as Kantor and organist. A particular focus in the 1980s was the annual Family Music Weeks in Leck (Schleswig-Holstein), which he initiated and directed.

== Main areas of research ==
- Curricular reform of music teaching
- Music education in the extracurricular area
- Didactics of Neue Musik
- Further training for adults

== Publications ==
- Gutachten zum Entwurf eines Ausbildungsmodells "Primarstufenlehrer mit zusätzlicher Fakultas für die Vorklasse bzw. für die Eingangsstufe im Fach Musik".
- Die Jugendmusikbewegung. Impulse und Wirkungen. (ed.), Wolfenbüttel 1987.
- Tätige Teilnahme an der Musik als erzieherischer Auftrag. Zum Praxis – Bezug und zur Verwirklichung von Jödes Reformkonzept im Musikunterricht, in Jugendbewegungen und Musikpädagogik, Sitzungsbericht der Wissenschaftlichen Sozietät Musikpädagogik, ed. by Sigrid Abel-Struth, Mainz 1987, pp. 111–133.
- Fritz Jödes Wirken während der Zeit des Dritten Reiches, in Fritz Jöde – Ein Beitrag zur Geschichte der Musikpädagogik des 20. Jahrhunderts, ed. by Hildegard Krützfeldt – Junker, (Musik im Diskurs 5), Regensburg 1988, pp. 115–130.
- Musik in der Eltern – und Familienbildung, am Beispiel Schleswig-Holstein, in Musikalische Erwachsenenbildung, Grundzüge – Entwicklungen, Perspektiven, ed. by Gerd Holtmeyer, Regensburg 1989, pp. 237–244.
- Warum singen wir im Unterricht ? Umrisse einer künftigen Singedidaktik, in Aspekte gegenwärtiger Musikpädagogik. Ein Fach im Umbruch, ed. by Wulf Dieter Lugert and Volker Schütz, Stuttgart 1991, pp. 149–158.
- Lebenswelt und Gesangsunterricht als Forschungsgegenstand, in Musikpädagogische Forschungsberichte 1994. ed. by Heiner Gembris among others, Augsburg 1995, (Forum Musikpädagogik 13), pp. 187–193.
- Verzweiflung und Hoffnung. Arnold Schönberg: "Ein Überlebender aus Warschau", in Musikvermittlung, ed. by Reinhard Schneider, (Musik im Diskurs 11), Regensburg 1995, pp. 117–126.
- Kunst und ästhetische Bildung in der modernen Welt – wir brauchen eine neue Ästhetik, in Ästhetik in der kulturellen Bildung, Remscheid 1997, (Schriftenreihe der Bundesvereinigung Kulturelle Jugendbildung 41), pp. 59–65.
- Zum Kunstanspruch atonaler Musik. in Systematische Musikpädagogik, ed. by Martin Pfeffer among others (Forum Musikpädagogik 34), Augsburg 1998, pp. 451–460.
- Verein der Musikfreunde. Ein Kieler Konzertleben. together with Selke Harten-Strehk and Oliver Kopf, ed. by Wolfgang Schmöe, Kiel 2001.
- "Nur durch Töne Sagbares": Zur Vermittlung der Wahrheit von Anton Weberns Sechs Stücke für Orchester op. 6, in Sachen Musikpädagogik. Aspekte und Positionen, ed. by Stephan Hörmann among others, Frankfurt 2003, pp. 317–327.
