= Bernd Sponheuer =

German musicologist

Bernd Sponheuer (born 6 February 1948) is a German musicologist.

== Career ==
Born in Herford, Sponheuer studied musicology from 1969 to 1976, from 1970 as a scholarship holder of the Studienstiftung des deutschen Volkes, (among others with Anna Amalie Abert, Kurt Gudewill and Walter Salmen), German Studies and philosophy at the Christian-Albrechts-Universität zu Kiel. In 1973 he completed his studies of German language and literature with the Magister Artium (subject: "Pragmatic and rhetorical elements in the language of city advertising"). In 1976 he received his doctorate in musicology under Kurt Gudewill with a study on the history of the genre and aesthetics of the symphony. In 1978 he published his dissertation under the title "Logik des Zerfall. Investigations on the Final Problem in the Symphonies of Gustav Mahler".

In 1984 he received his habilitation in musicology with a thesis on Musik als Kunst und Nicht-Kunst. Untersuchungen zur ästhetischen Dichotomie von 'hoher' and 'niederer' Musik im musikästhetischen Denken zwischen Kant und Hanslick“. From 1985 to 1987 he was visiting scholar at the Berlin University of the Arts. Afterwards Sponheur was a research assistant at the Musicological Institute of the University of Kiel. In 1990 he was appointed to the chair of musicology at the Folkwang University of the Arts in Essen. In the same year he became professor for historical musicology at the University of Kiel. His main areas of research are general music history of the 17th to 20th centuries, aesthetics of music and music during the National Socialist era.

From 1994 to 1997 he was editor of the journal Die Musikforschung and from 1996 to 1998 vice dean of the faculty of philosophy.

== Writings ==
- Logik des Zerfalls : Unters. zum Finalproblem in d. Symphonien Gustav Mahlers.
- Robert Schumann und die grosse Form : Referate des Bonner Symposions 2006.
- ZeitGenossen : 17 Lebensbilder von Kommunist/inn/en.
- Popmusik und Kunstreligion : theoretische Überlegungen.
- Vom Gehirn, vom Hut und von der Garderobe : Hanns Eislers musikalische "Spässe".
