= German Musicological Society =

- Formation: 1946
- Headquarters: Kassel
- Location: Germany
- Fields: Musicology
- Members: 1600 (2021)

The German Musicological Society (German: Gesellschaft für Musikforschung, abbreviated to GfM) is an academic society of musicologists and institutes active in study, research and teaching in Germany. It has over 1600 members. The association is based in Kassel, Hesse.

== History ==
The society was founded in 1946, continuing the work of a predecessor institution. It deals with questions of historical musicology, ethnomusicology and systematic musicology. The society also promotes musicological research in dialogue with other disciplines. In addition, it sees itself as an organ for communicating findings from the field of music to the public.

The society publishes the scholarly journal Die Musikforschung by Bärenreiter-Verlag and also collaborates with the publishers Breitkopf & Härtel, Henle, Laaber, Georg Olms, and Schott.

Every year a scientific conference with symposia, lectures and events of the specialist groups is organized; every four years another one is held as the "Internationaler Kongress der Gesellschaft für Musikforschung".

== Honorary members ==
- Anna Amalie Abert
- Richard Baum
- Hanspeter Bennwitz
- Georg von Dadelsen
- Rudolf Eller
- Ludwig Finscher
- Günther Henle
- Friedhelm Krummacher
- Helga de la Motte-Haber
- Christoph-Hellmut Mahling
- Klaus Wolfgang Niemöller
- Wolfgang Rehm
- Martin Ruhnke
- Barbara Scheuch-Vötterle
- Artur Simon
- Rudolf Stephan
- Walter Wiora
- Frieder Zschoch

== Literature ==
- Kurt Gudewill: Zwanzig Jahre Gesellschaft für Musikforschung. in Die Musikforschung 20 (1967), pp. 247–252.
