= Frieder Zschoch =

German musicologist

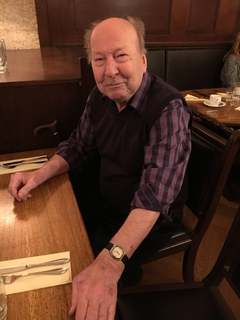
Frieder Zschoch in 2016

Frieder Zschoch (30 March 1932 – 3 March 2016) was a German musicologist.

== Life ==
Zschoch was born in Großenhain as the second son of the Lutheran pastor Reinhold Zschoch and his wife Hildegard. He grew up in a musical home and received piano and trumpet lessons. In the autumn semester of 1950, he enrolled at the University of Leipzig for the subject musicology.

His teachers there were Walter Serauky, Hellmuth Christian Wolff, Richard Petzoldt and Rudolf Eller. In addition, he studied Germanistics from 1950 to 1952 and was a guest student at the Humboldt University of Berlin with Hans-Heinz Dräger for the subject of systematic musicology. In May 1954, he passed the Staatsexamen for musicology in Leipzig.

He wrote his diploma thesis on the subject Die Verwendung der Trompete in Oper und Sinfonik des Barockzeitalters unter besonderer Berücksichtigung Georg Friedrich Händels (The use of the trumpet in opera and symphonic music of the baroque age with special reference to George Frideric Handel).

Following his studies, he worked for the VEB Friedrich Hofmeister Verlag Leipzig and for the Gewerkschaft Kunst, before becoming an assistant lecturer in September 1954 at the VEB, founded on 1 January 1954. German publisher for music (DVfM). This publishing house specialised in complete edition projects (Bach, Handel, Mozart) in cooperation with the Bärenreiter-Verlag in Kassel.

On 1 January 1955 Zschoch was hired as a permanent editor and was immediately responsible for the first volume of the Hallische Händel-Ausgabe (HHA).

Zschoch belongs to the group of thirteen Handelians who founded the Georg-Friedrich-Händel-Gesellschaft on 23 April 1955. Among the signatures on the foundation charter are those of Max Schneider, Rudolf Steglich, Karl Vötterle, Georg Engelmann, Walther Siegmund-Schultze, Wolfgang Rehm, Konrad Sasse and Arno Rammelt.

Zschoch remained firmly attached to the Georg-Friedrich-Händel-Gesellschaft and the Hallische Händel-Ausgabe. As an editor, he accompanied not only numerous volumes of the Bach, Handel and Telemann editions, but also the four-volume Handel Handbook. In GDR times, he was the link between the DVfM and the Bärenreiter-Verlag.

After the fall of the Wall, he moved to the Bärenreiter-Verlag in Kassel in 1990, until he retired in 2002.

Zschoch was a member of the board of the Handel Society for many years and became an honorary member in 2003.

He died in Leipzig at the age of 83.
