= Meinhart Volkamer =

German educator (born 1936)

Meinhart Volkamer (born 3 May 1936) is a German educator.

== Life ==
Born in Leipzig, Volkamer passed the first Staatsexamen in Freiburg im Breisgau in the topics sport and German language and passed the second Staatsexamen as a student assistant for these two subjects in Marburg. Afterwards he was a research assistant at the University of Kiel for six years. At the same time, he studied psychology, the subject in which he received his doctorate in 1969.

From 1969 to 2001 he was professor for sport pedagogy at the University of Osnabrück. Afterwards he became emeritus.

At the beginning of his professional career he was an educational thinking psychologist and later became a psychologically thinking psychologist. During his professional career he worked in all three areas essential for the training of sports teachers (sports theory, sports practice and in school practical studies) and accompanied the development of sport pedagogy in theory and practice in many lectures and essays in a critical and constructive way. His main research topics were: aggression in sports, mental training, measuring and censoring in physical education, problems of the role of the sports teacher, teacher behavior, sports in school/club and teacher language.

Volkamer became known mainly through the development of the standardized motoric test for four to six year old children (in cooperation with Renate Zimmer) and some of his books.

== Publications ==
- Erziehen als Aufgabe : sportpädagogische Reflexionen; Festschrift anlässlich der Emeritierung von Prof. Dr. Meinhart Volkamer. (2001)
- Messen und Zensieren im Sportunterricht.
- Vom Mut, trotzdem Lehrer zu sein : Überlegungen am Beispiel des Sportunterrichts.
- Von der Last mit der Lust im Schulsport : Probleme der Pädagogisierung des Sports.
- Zur Problematik motorischer Entwicklungstests.
- Sportpädagogisches Kaleidoskop : Texte, Episoden und Skizzen zu sportpädagogischen Problemen; ein Lesebuch.
