= Heiner Gembris =

German musicologist (born 1954)

Heiner Gembris (born 13 July 1954) is a German musicologist with a focus on music psychology.

== Life and career ==
Born in Paderborn, Gembris studied school music at the Hochschule für Musik Detmold as well as German Studies and musicology at the Free University Berlin and Technische Universität Berlin. After his doctorate in 1985 and several years of teaching at a Berlin grammar school, he worked as a research assistant at Technische Universität Berlin. From 1996 to 2001, he was an Academic Councilor in music education at the University of Augsburg. At the Westfälische Wilhelms-Universität (1991 to 1997) and the Martin-Luther-University Halle-Wittenberg (1996–2001), he held a professorship for systematic musicology. Since April 2001, Gembris has been professor of music, empirical music education and music psychology at the University of Paderborn and Director of the Institute for Research on Musical Ability (IBFM). His main areas of work include musical talent and development in a lifetime perspective, music reception and the effects of music.
