= Heinrich W. Schwab =

German musicologist and teacher (1938–2025)

Heinrich Wilhelm Schwab (8 May 1938 – 20 January 2025) was a German musicologist.

== Life and career ==
Born in Ludwigshafen Schwab received his doctorate from the University of Saarbrücken in 1964 with a thesis on the influences of 18th century music on that of the 19th century. From 1966 he took part in a research project at the University of Kiel that focused on Scandinavian and Baltic music history. Since 1998 he was professor for musicology at the University of Copenhagen. He has been a member of the Royal Swedish Academy of Music and the Norwegian Academy of Sciences since 1998, and of the Royal Danish Academy of Sciences and Letters since 1999 and since 2005 a member of the Academia Europaea. In 2009 he was awarded the Order of Merit of the Federal Republic of Germany on ribbon. Schwab died on 20 January 2025, at the age of 86.

== Publications ==
- Sangbarkeit, Popularität und Kunstlied. Studien zu Lied und Liedästhetik der mittleren Goethezeit (1770–1814) (Studies on the history of music in the 19th century, vol. 3), Regensburg: Bosse 1965
- Das Einnahmebuch des Schleswiger Stadtmusikanten Friedrich Adolph Berwald.
- Die Anfänge des weltlichen Berufsmusikertums in der mittelalterlichen Stadt. Studie zu einer Berufs- und Sozialgeschichte des Stadtmusikantentums. Habil. Schrift, maschr. Privatdruck, Kiel 1977, 149 S. – (printed as) Kieler Schriften zur Musikwissenschaft, vol. 24, Kassel: Bärenreiter 1982
- Friedrich Ludwig Aemilius Kunzen (1761–1817). Stationen seines Lebens und Wirkens. [Catalogue of the] exhibition on the occasion of the anniversary of the appointment as music director of the Royal Danish Court Chapel in 1795 (Schriften der Schleswig-Holsteinischen Landesbibliothek, edited by Dieter Lohmeier, vol. 21), both in Holstein: Verlag Boyens & Co. 1995
