= Karl Vötterle =

German publisher (1903–1975)

Karl Vötterle (12 April 1903 – 29 October 1975) was a German music publisher.

== Life ==
Vötterle was born in Augsburg. With the intention of printing song sheets for the members of the musical youth movement, he founded the Bärenreiter-Verlag in Augsburg in 1923 (since 1927 in Kassel), which he made into one of the major music publishers worldwide. The rediscovery of Heinrich Schütz was decisive for the success of the publishing house in the first years. With the publication of the Quempas in 1930 he again stimulated new advent and Christmas musical singing customs. In Munich he became involved in the youth movement reformed Hochschulgilde Werdandi. The association magazine Der deutsche Bursch of the Deutsche Gildenschaft appeared about this contact in the youth movement-oriented Bärenreiter publishing house.

Early on Vötterle published contemporary composers like Hugo Distler, Ernst Pepping and Willy Burkhard. Promoting the music of the present has always been one of the publisher's guidelines, along with the cultivation of the masters of the past. In 1933, together with Richard Baum, he founded the Kasseler Musiktage, initially a gathering of amateur musicians, then after the war soon an event with a sharply defined content profile that attracted many interested people to Kassel.

Between 1933 and 1945, as director of the Bärenreiter publishing house, he continued to publish (also contemporary) Christian music, but also published Nazi songs and choral works, among them an SS-Treuelied, as well as choral books with system-conform prefaces. As publisher of the Christian Sonntagsbrief in the affiliated Neuwerk publishing house Vötterle was expelled from the Reichspressekammer in December 1935, but shortly afterwards was taken up again under conditions. The Christian newspaper, in which articles critical of the system had also appeared, was banned.

In 1936 Vötterle joined the Reiter-Sturmabteilung, in which he last had the rank of Oberscharführer. On application of 4 April 1937, he became a member of the NSDAP with effect from 1 May 1937 (member number 4.629.166). In September 1944 Vötterle was denounced by Herbert Gerigk at the Hauptamt Schrifttum in Amt Rosenberg for anthroposophical and denominational ties.

After the war Vötterle had to face the denazification proceedings. On 21 November 1947 a Spruchkammerverfahren declared him exonerated and gave the following reasons in summary: "From all this it follows that the person concerned at the latest since 1935 has actively resisted National Socialism according to his strength out of his anti-National Socialist convictions."

After the subsequent regaining of the publisher's license, Vötterle and his employees, who had returned home from the war, rebuilt the destroyed publishing house with their own hands and continued the publishing work. As a consequence of the regained democracy in Germany and the international contacts that were once again possible, Vötterle established a network of relationships far beyond Germany as early as the 1950s. He saw the "Stunde der Gesamtausgabe" coming at this time and, in cooperation with publicly funded institutes, gradually began publishing scholarly critical collected works of Christoph Willibald Gluck. (from 1951), Georg Philipp Telemann (from 1953), Johann Sebastian Bach (from 1954), Wolfgang Amadeus Mozart (from 1955), George Frideric Handel (from 1955), Heinrich Schütz (from 1955), Franz Schubert (from 1964) and Hector Berlioz (from 1967). These editions, some of which have not yet been completed, are the basis of the international reputation of the Bärenreiter publishing house.

Already in 1949 the first of the 17-volume encyclopedia Die Musik in Geschichte und Gegenwart (MGG) was published. Vötterle continued his commitment to contemporary music. Composers like Ernst Krenek, Giselher Klebe, Günter Bialas and others published their works with Bärenreiter. Vötterle was founder and co-founder of numerous companies, including the Neue Schütz-Gesellschaft (today "Internationale Heinrich-Schütz-Gesellschaft"), the Gesellschaft für Musikforschung, the Interessengemeinschaft musikwissenschaftlicher Herausgeber und Verleger (today Verwertungsgesellschaft Musikedition). Vötterle was also active beyond the field of music, for example as one of the founders of the Berneuchen Movement and the Brüder Grimm-Museum Kassel. The Bärenreiter publishing house and the affiliated Johannes-Stauda publishing house published books and writings on theology, history, Hessian regional studies, etc. He received numerous honours, including honorary doctorates from the universities of Kiel (musicology, 1953) and Leipzig (theology, also 1953).

Vötterle died in Kassel at the age of 72.

== Awards ==
- 1953: Verdienstkreuz als Stecknadel (later renamed 1st class) of the Federal Republic of Germany
- 1964: Bavarian Order of Merit
- 1968: Verdienstorden der Bundesrepublik Deutschland
- 1968: Honorary Senator of the University of Marburg

== Writings ==
- Haus unterm Stern. Kassel 1949, 4th ed. 1969.

== Literature ==
- Kurt Gudewill: Karl Vötterle zum 70. Geburtstag. In Die Musikforschung 26 (1973) 1, p. 3.
- Fred K. Prieberg: Handbuch Deutsche Musiker 1933–1945. Kiel 2004, CD-Rom-Lexikon, pp. 7445–7448.
