= Hans-Georg Herrlitz =

German educator

Hans-Georg Herrlitz (born 10 October 1934) is a German educator.

== Life ==
Born in Parlin, Herrlitz was educated in Grutschno, district Schwetz. After the escape he continued his school career at the Municipal Secondary School for Boys (Goethe-Schule Flensburg, where he passed the Abitur in 1954. From 1954 to 1959 he studied German culture, history, philosophy and education at the Albert-Ludwigs-Universität Freiburg, the University of Hamburg, the Freie Universität Berlin and the University of Kiel. He completed his studies with the Staatsexamen for the teaching profession at secondary schools in the subjects history and German.

In 1962 he received his doctorate from the Faculty of Philosophy at the University of Kiel with a dissertation on Die geschichtliche Entwicklung des Lektüre-Kanons im muttersprachlichen Unterricht des Gymnasiums (The historical development of the reading canon in the mother-tongue teaching of the grammar school). His thesis supervisor was Fritz Blättner. Afterwards he was appointed scientific assistant at the Institute for Pedagogics of the University of Kiel (director: Theodor Wilhelm). From 1967 to 1969 he was a habilitation scholarship holder of the Deutsche Forschungsgemeinschaft. In 1970 he received his habilitation in the subject of education from the Faculty of Philosophy at the University of Kiel. The topic of the habilitation thesis was Maturität. Lehrplan- und gesellschaftsgeschichtliche Studien zur Entstehung des Hochschulreife-Problems im 18. Jahrhundert.

In 1971, Herrlitz declined a call to the University of Frankfurt and accepted a call to the Georg-August-Universität Göttingen as successor to Heinrich Roth. His analyses of the teaching profession and needs, mainly financed by the DFG, dealt with the overcrowding crises and the pork cycle: Regularly the teacher training programme is overcrowded at the wrong times or, on the other hand, the job market for teachers is empty.

Herrlitz began in 1972 with the scientific accompaniment of the school experiment Georg-Christoph-Lichtenberg-Gesamtschule by the project group SIGS (Social Interaction in Comprehensive Schools), financed by means of the Federal Ministry for Education and Science as well as the Ministry of Culture of Lower Saxony until 1980. He was for 12 years expert reviewer of the DFG, senator of the university, dean, chairman of the senate committee for physical exercises. For 30 years he was editor of the journal Die Deutsche Schule published by the Gewerkschaft Erziehung und Wissenschaft and is honorary member of the Deutsche Gesellschaft für Erziehungswissenschaft.

In 2000 Herrlitz became emeritus.

== Publications ==
- Der Lektüre-Kanon des Deutschunterrichts im Gymnasium : ein Beitrag zur Geschichte der muttersprachlichen Schulliteratur.
- Auf dem Weg zur Historischen Bildungsforschung. Weinheim (Juventa) 2001
- with Wulf Hopf, Hartmut Titze und Ernst Cloer: Deutsche Schulgeschichte von 1800 bis zur Gegenwart. Weinheim (Juventa) 1983 bis 2009 (5th edition.)
- with Dieter Weiland und Klaus Winkel: Die Gesamtschule. Weinheim (Juventa) 2003
- with Christa Berg und Klaus-Peter Horn: Kleine Geschichte der Deutschen Gesellschaft für Erziehungswissenschaft. 2004
