= Richard Weyl =

German geologist

Richard H. Weyl (10 August 1912, Kiel - 1988) was a German geologist and noted author on the subject of Central American Geology.

Active member of the Bundesanstalt für Geowissenschaften und Rohstoffe (BGR, Federal Institute for Geosciences and Natural Resources; formerly the Bundesanstalt für Bodenforschung, BfB) in Latin-America and the Caribbean.

1941-1956 Scientist at Paläontologisches Institut und Museum (University of Kiel, Germany)

Since 1956 Professor at the University of Giessen, Geologisch-Paläontologisches Institut.

Apparently there is a peak in Costa Rica named after him. (Near Mount Chirripó)

== Education ==
Ph.D. Geology (University of Heidelberg, 1936)

== Works Published ==
Die Geologie Mittelamerikas (The Geology of Central America)/ von Dr. Richard Weyl. Berlin-Nikolassee : Gebruder Borntraeger, 1961. ISBN 3-443-11001-0

Geologie der Antillen / Richard Weil. Berlin-Nikolassee : Borntraeger, 1966.

Geology of Central America / by Richard Weyl. Berlin : Gebr. Borntraeger, 1980.
