= Anna Amalie Abert =

German musicologist

- Born: 19 September 1906; Halle
- Died: 4 January 1996 (aged 89); Kiel
- Education: University of Kiel
- Occupation: Professor
- Employer: University of Kiel

Anna Amalie Abert or Anna Abert (19 September 1906 – 4 January 1996) was a German musicologist.

== Life ==
Abert was born in Halle (Saale) in 1906.

Abert was the daughter of the music historian Hermann Abert. She studied with Hans Joachim Moser and Friedrich Blume at the University of Kiel. From 1943 to 1971 she worked at the university. In 1950 she became a professor. She has studied the works of Heinrich Schütz, Monteverdi, Gluck and Richard Strauss.

Abert wrote a thesis on the 1625 Cantiones sacrae by Heinrich Schütz which was published in 1935.

In 1962 she published her book on the history of opera.

In 1964 she published a thesis which convincingly argued that Symphony, K. 45a was an unknown work by Mozart.

Abert died in Kiel in 1996 at age 89.
