= Martin Ruhnke =

German musicologist

Martin Ruhnke (14 June 1921 – 25 September 2004) was a German musicologist. His main areas of research were the music theory of early baroque music, Italian baroque opera and the life and work of Georg Philipp Telemann.

== Life ==
Born in Koszalin, Ruhnke was appointed in Kiel where he gained his doctorate in 1954 with a thesis on Joachim Burmeister's music theory. Afterwards he was Wissenschaftlicher Assistent at the Free University of Berlin and habilitatetd in 1961. In 1964 he was appointed to the chair of musicology at the Friedrich-Alexander-Universität Erlangen-Nürnberg, which he held until he became emeritus in 1986.

From 1968 to 1974 Ruhnke was president of the Gesellschaft für Musikforschung and from 1991 to 1997 president of the International Telemann Society. From 1960 to 2003 he was responsible for the Telemann edition of the Zentrum für Telemann-Pflege und -Forschung Magdeburg. In 1984, 1992 and 1999 his three-volume Telemann-Werke-Verzeichnis was published, in which he completed the Telemann-Vokalwerke-Verzeichnis by Werner Menke (1982/1983) with the instrumental works. Ruhnke "influenced [...] Telemann research as a whole, which he introduced into academic discourse and for which he set important standards" (Ute Poetzsch). In 1995 he received the Georg-Philipp-Telemann-Preis der Landeshauptstadt Magdeburg. He also studied the music history of his home Pomerania and became a member of the Historische Kommission für Pommern.
