= Friedrich Blume =

German musicologist (1893–1975)

Friedrich Blume (5 January 1893, in Schlüchtern, Hesse-Nassau – 22 November 1975, in Schlüchtern) was professor of musicology at the University of Kiel from 1938 to 1958. He was a student in Munich, Berlin and Leipzig, and taught in the last two of these for some years before being called to the chair in Kiel. His early studies were on Lutheran church music, including several books on J.S. Bach, but broadened his interests considerably later. Among his prominent works were chief editor of the collected Praetorius edition, and he also edited the important Eulenburg scores of the major Mozart Piano Concertos. From 1949 he was involved in the planning and writing of Die Musik in Geschichte und Gegenwart.

== Life ==
Blume, son of a tax inspector, studied from 1911 to 1914 at the universities of Munich, Leipzig and Berlin. Initially studying medicine, he then applied himself to musicology, art history and philosophy. After military service and captivity during World War I, he continued his studies in Leipzig in 1919 and was awarded a doctorate in 1921 with Studies on the history of the orchestral suite in the 15th and 16th centuries. From 1921, Blume worked as an assistant of Hermann Abert at the University of Leipzig, and after 1923 at the University of Berlin, where he gained his habilitation with the treatise The Monodic principle in Protestant church music in 1925. From 1927 to 1929 he was the head of the Institute of Musicology.

Blume was a member of the Kampfbund für deutsche Kultur (lit. "Patriotic League for German Culture") and after its dissolution in 1934, of the National Socialist cultural community. In 1934 he became a member of the Rotary Club, which was similarly suspicious of the leading Nazi-cultural politicians, as were the Freemasons. After the seizure of power by the Nazis through the Reichstag Fire Decree and Enabling Act of 1933, Blume was appointed an unofficial professor and taught music history at the Church Music School in Berlin-Spandau. With the transference of Fritz Stein to the management of the Hochschule für Musik in Berlin in 1933, he simultaneously held the professorship at the Christian-Albrechts-Universität zu Kiel from 1 May 1933; he was confirmed in the position a year later and worked there until his Emeritus in 1958, from 1939 as Professor. In 1946/47 he was one of the first Rectors of the postwar period in Germany.

Blume was appointed a member of the State Institute for German Music Research in 1935, which entrusted him with the "German Heritage of Music" series in 1939 and the publication of the magazine "Deutsche Musikkultur" until 1944. In 1942 he took over the chairmanship of the New Schütz Society.

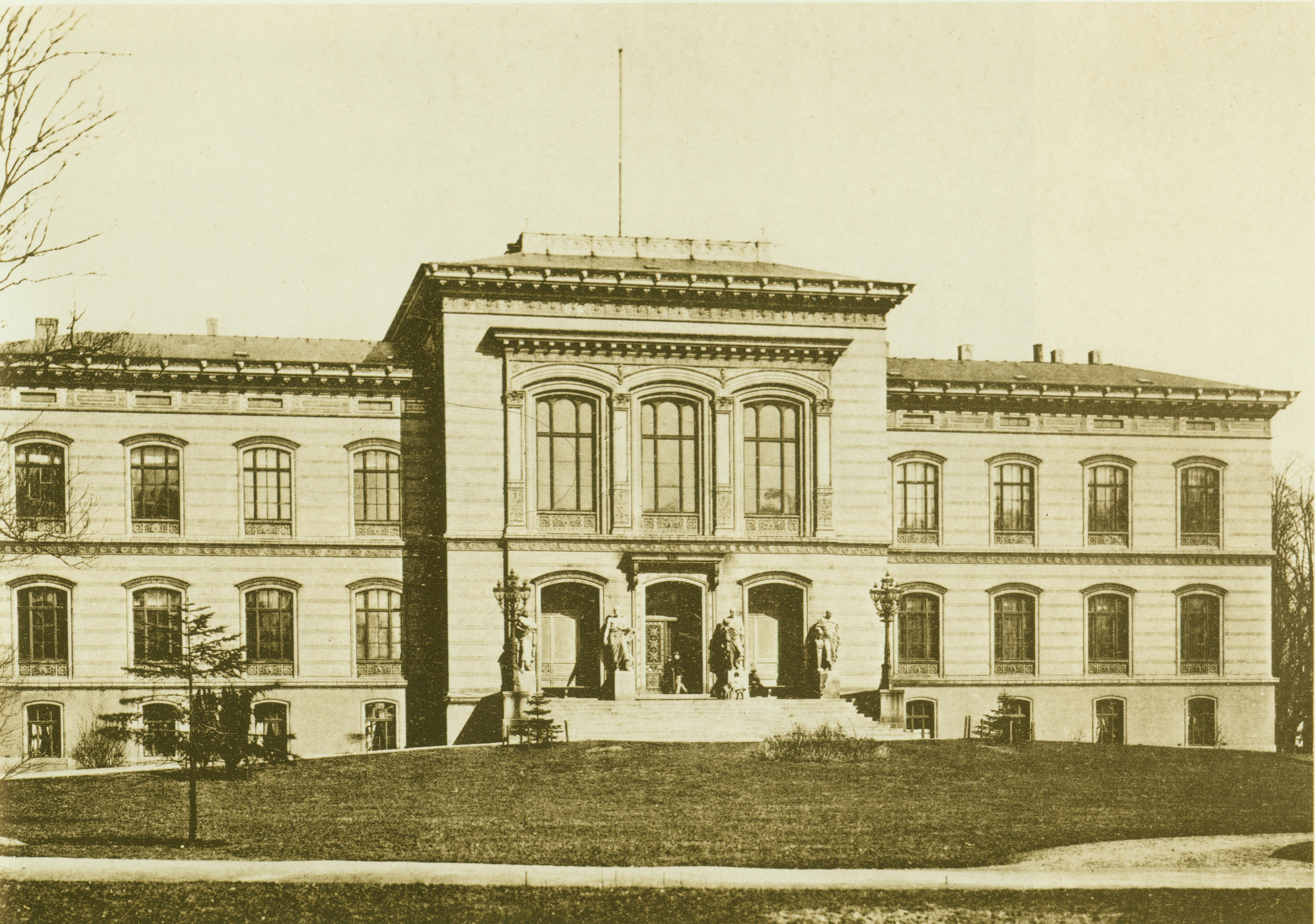
The main building of Kiel University in 1893

Blume was not part of the National Socialist German Workers' Party (NSDAP). At the University of Kiel, he was first employed as a non-employee Professor and would finance his position there every year through scholarships, which were recommended by the Kiel-based NS lecturer, Eggers, as well as the dean of his faculty. After a restrictive introduction ("I hardly know him"), Eggers, in his recommendation to his deputy Prof. Fiedler, introduced Blume as a "politically perfect character". Eggers also noted that Blume was "neither a member of the NSDAP nor of a structure or of a federation of the NSDAP".

Nevertheless, he regarded his "probable" involvement as an active Nazi, but Blume favored a much lower sum of scholarship than the Dean of the Faculty of Philosophy, Prof. Weinhandl. At the beginning of 1939, Blume was appointed full professor. In 1941, at the Berlin Nazi lecturer's office, Blume appealed to the university there – despite the vote of the commission of professors of the Faculty of Philosophy, who clearly favored Blume. The American musicologist Pamela Potter writes: "The objections raised by the lecturer's office came originally either from Amt Rosenberg or the Propagandaministerium (Ministry of Propaganda)."

At the Musikmusschaftliches Tagung 1938 symposium, within the framework of the Reichsmusiktage, Blume read a position paper on 'Musik und Rasse' (Music and Race); the lecture first appeared in Die Musik ('Music') under the title Musik und Rasse: Grundfragen einer musikalischen Rasseforschung (Music and Race: Fundamental questions of musical racial research), and later as the book Das Rasseproblem in der Musik: Entwurf zu einer Methodologie musikwissenschaftlicher Rasseforschung (The racial problem in music: Design for a methodology of musicological racial research). Fred K. Prieberg said "in fact Blume branded the Nazi racial doctrine as unscientific." Similar assessments have been expressed by, for example, the Nazi music experts Albrecht Dümling, Gisela Probst-Effah (University of Cologne), Eva Weissweiler, the French composer Amaury du Closel or the British musicologists Ernest Newman and Richard Freymann.

The musicologist Michael Custodis, on the other hand, thinks that Blume's writing (Das Rasseproblem in der Musik) (The Racial Problem in Music) can itself be regarded as "Nazi propaganda" with "few glances [...]" Pamela Potter speaks of Blume's "masterly lavishing on this question [music and race]", which on the one hand had given him praise from the ranks of the Nazi critics, but on the other hand: "Did not force them to suppress the speech or their extended version in the monograph after 1945".

After the end of World War II, The Racial Problem in Music was placed in the Soviet Occupation Zone on their banned book list, but not in West Germany, where it remained available in some large libraries. Against the backdrop of biological, ideological, as well as musicological influences, hasty attempts were made to infer from the person of the composer, tone systems, melody, rhythm, etc., their race-specific characteristics. Blume in his writing succinctly states: "Let us openly say that we have no reliable knowledge of the connection between music and race for the time being" and: "Researching race in and of itself is a matter for biology, in part for psychology. Exploring music is a matter of musicology".

In 1939 Blume was commissioned to publish an account of the work of German musicology for the anthology Deutsche Wissenschaften: Arbeit und Aufgabe (German Science: Work and Task), a Festschrift for Hitler's 50th birthday. His three-page survey also touches on the "intricate questions about the interrelationship between [Blume's] 'Music and Race'". He concludes his brief excursion on the subject with the following: "Here, the National Socialist orientation of music research places the clear task of laying the foundation on which the construction of a musical racial research can be built. In a few years, great success has been achieved. Comprehensive work requires a longer start-up time. The planned work has been achieved, the view has been directed towards new goals". In 1944 Blume repeated in the 2nd edition of his book Das Rasseproblem in der Musik his statement of 1939: "daß wir von dem Zusammenhange zwischen Musik und Rasse wissenschaftlich vorläufig keinerlei gesicherte Kenntnis haben" (that we have no scientific knowledge of the relationship between music and race for the time being).

In the 2004 collection Handbuch Deutsche Musiker 1933–1945 (Handbook to German Musicians), Fred K. Prieberg published the following Blume quote from a preface to the Schleswig-Holstein Choral Festival in April 1939: "The men and women who come together to the 'Schleswig-Holstein choral festival' in Flensburg with German choirs from the ceded territories, do not only want to demonstrate their artistic aspiration and ability, but rather to pay homage to the overarching and binding thoughts of the German People's Community and the German state as a whole. They want to make a faithful confession to leaders and empire, to the unity of blood and culture, and they want to dress it in the form of the highest state-forming art power that we know: in the form of music". Prieberg, however, only interprets these sentences as a lip service and explains a few pages further in his Handbook explicitly that he does not consider Blume a "Nazi".

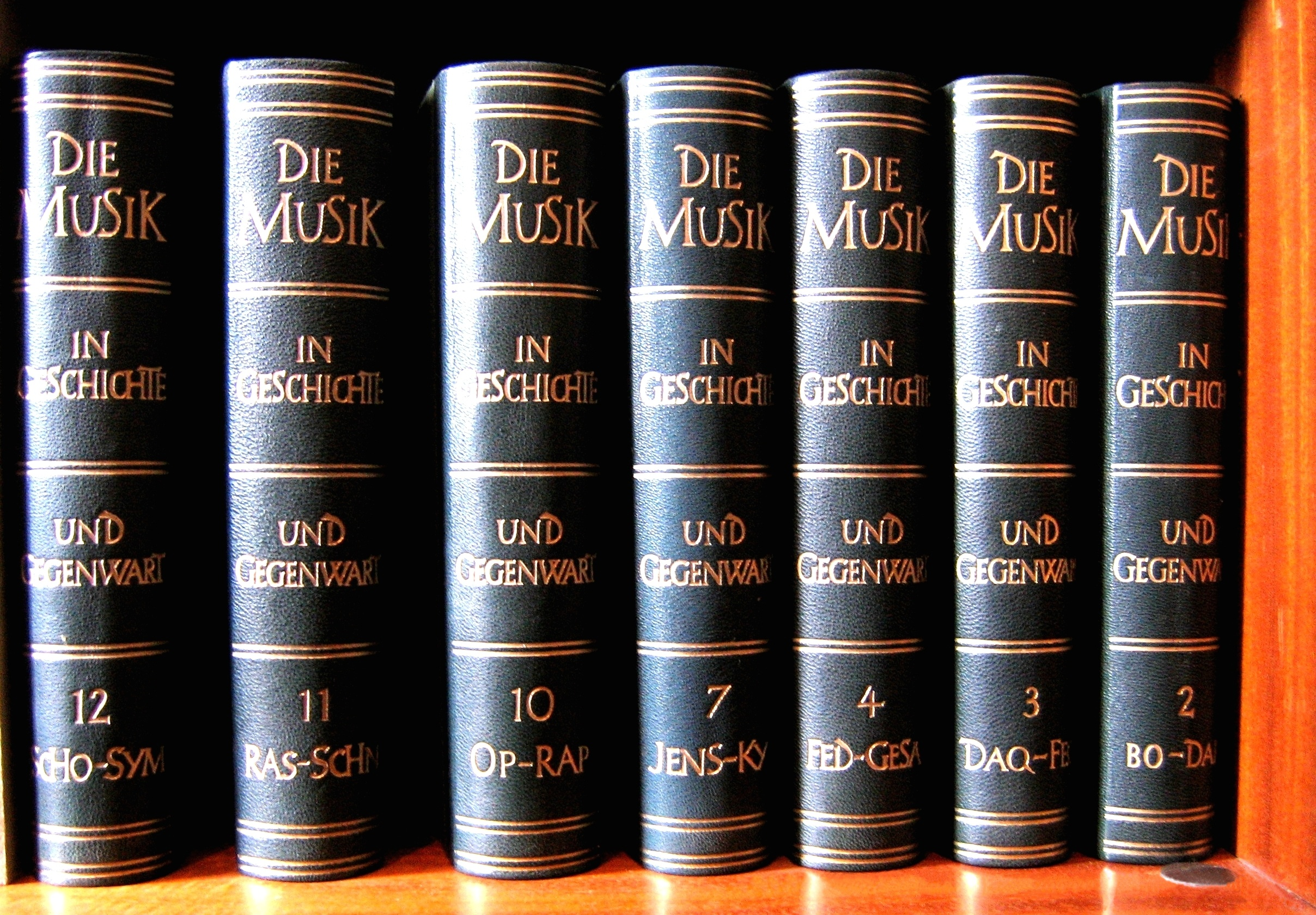
Die Musik in Geschichte und Gegenwart, first edition

In Blume's 1947 denazification, the mechanism under the chairmanship of the legal scientist and earlier "fanatical advocates of the racial laws" (Süddeutsche Zeitung, 9 May 2012), and later Minister of the Interior of Schleswig-Holstein Hermann von Mangoldt into category V ("unencumbered"), Blume's writing Das Rasseproblem in der Musik was once again the subject of a short controversy. The expert Hans Dunkel, who was responsible for the final clarification of this matter, came to the conclusion after reading the book: "The political race question or the Jewish question are not touched at all in the book, any Nazi ideology and phraseology are absent. I could portray it as a courageous act by Prof. Blume to have written this book in his own way". In 1942 Blume took up the suggestion of Karl Vötterle, the founder of the Bärenreiter-Verlag, to become their editor for the preparation of the encyclopaedia Die Musik in Geschichte und Gegenwart (Music in History and Present). This lexicon appeared as 14 volumes between 1949 and 1968 under Blume's leadership (the supplementary volumes and an index book were later published by his daughter Ruth Blume from 1973 to 1986). From 1947 to 1962, he was also a major figure in the reconstruction of German musicology as president of the Society for Music Research.

In 1948 he was elected to the presidency of the newly founded Internationalen Gesellschaft für Musikwissenschaft, where from 1958 to 1961 he worked as its president. He was also an organizer of the Internationale Vereinigung der Musikbibliotheken, Musikarchive und Musikdokumentationszentren (International Association of Music Libraries, Music Archives and Music Documentation Centers), and RISM, as President of the International Heinrich Schütz Society and Chairman of the Joseph Haydn Institute. He was awarded numerous honors and distinctions for his work.

== Essays/Papers ==
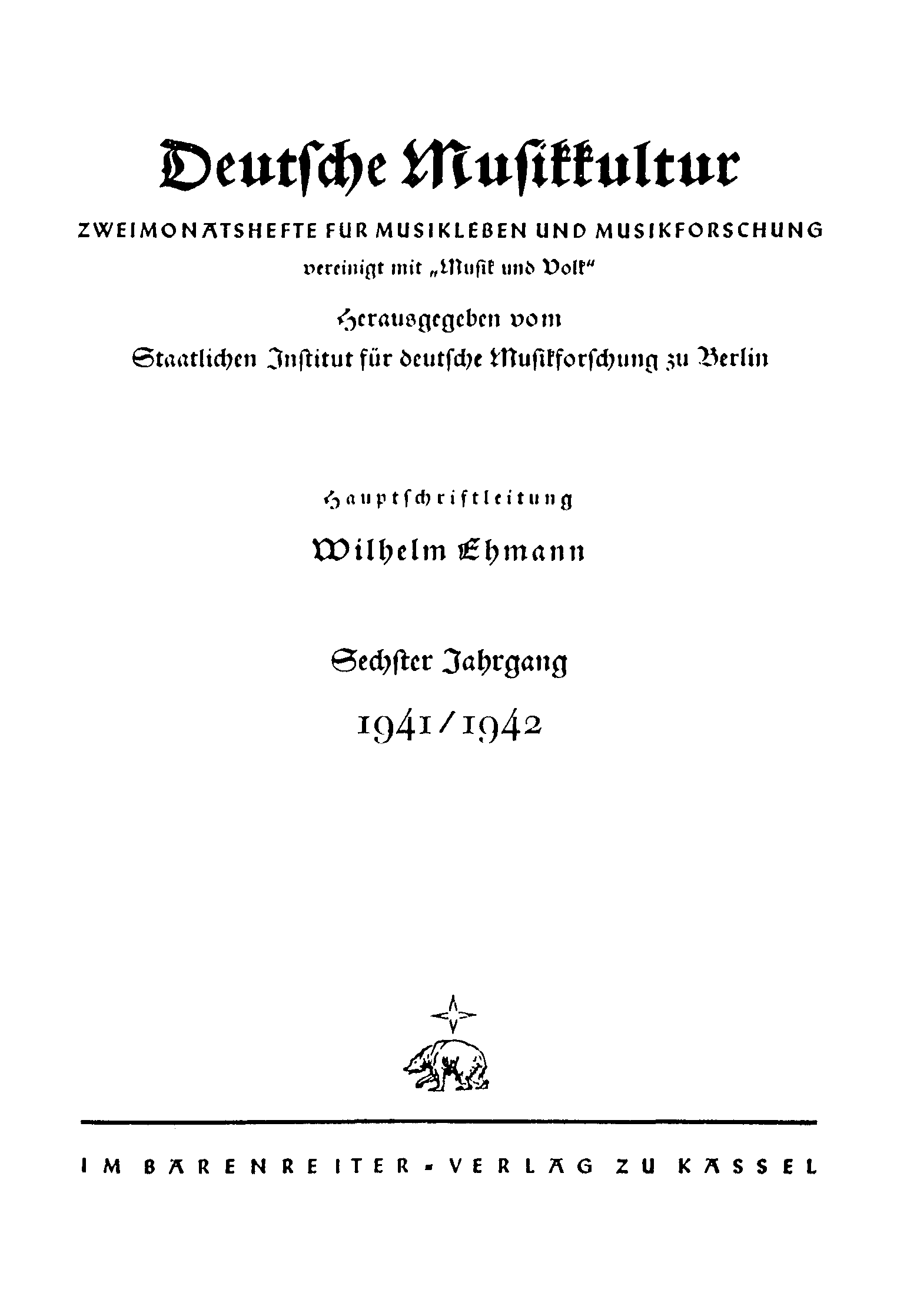
chronological

- Studien zur Vorgeschichte der Orchestersuite im 15. und 16. Jahrhundert (Dissertation, Universität Leipzig 1921), Leipzig 1925.
- "Die formgeschichtliche Stellung der Klavierkonzerte Mozarts," Mozart-Jahrbuch 1924, p. 81–107.
- Das monodische Prinzip in der protestantischen Kirchenmusik (Habilitationsschrift, Universität Berlin 1925), Leipzig 1925.
- "Eine unbekannte Violinsonate von J. S. Bach," in Bach-Jahrbuch 25, 1928, p. 96–118.
- "Max Bruch," in Deutsches Biographisches Jahrbuch, Volume 2: 1917–1920, Stuttgart 1928, p. 505–509.
- "Hermann Abert und die Musikwissenschaft," in Festschrift für Hermann Abert, ed. by Friedrich Blume, Halle 1928, p. 18–30.
- Fortspinnung und Entwicklung, in Jahrbuch 36 der Musikbibliothek Peters, Leipzig 1929, p. 51–71; Nachdruck in Syntagma Musicologicum 1, p. 504–525.
- Michael Praetorius Creuzburgensis, Berlin: Wolfenbüttel 1929.
- "Josquin des Prés," in Der Drachentöter. Jahrbuch des Kallmeyer-Verlags, Berlin: Wolfenbüttel 1929, p. 52–69.
- "Heinrich Schütz in den geistigen Strömungen seiner Zeit," in Musik und Kirche 11/1930, p. 245–254.
- "Joseph Haydns künstlerische Persönlichkeit in seinen Streichquartetten," in Jahrbuch 38 der Musikbibliothek Peters, Leipzig 1931, p. 24–48; Nachdruck in Syntagma musicologicum 1, p. 526–551.
- Die evangelische Kirchenmusik, Potsdam 1931; Nachdruck Laaber 1979.
- "Bach und Händel," in Die Musikpflege 5, 1934/35, p. 400–407.
- "Heinrich Schütz," in Die Großen Deutschen, ed. by W. Andreas and Wilh. by Scholz, Vol. 1, Berlin 1935, p. 627–643.
- Das Werk des Michael Praetorius, in the Zeitschrift für Musikwissenschaft 17, 1935, pp. 482–502.
- Musik und Rasse. Grundfragen einer musikalischen Rassenforschung, in Die Musik XXX/11, August 1938. p. 736–748.
- Erbe und Auftrag, in Deutsche Musikkultur 4/1939
- Deutsche Musikwissenschaft, in Deutsche Wissenschaften. Arbeit und Aufgabe. Dem Führer und Reichskanzler zum 50. Geburtstag, ed. by Bernhard Rust, Leipzig 1939, p. 16–18.
- Wolfgang Amadeus Mozart. Gedenkrede zu Mozarts 150. Todestag am 5 December 1941, Berlin: Wolfenbüttel 1942; 2nd ed. 1948.
- Das Rasseproblem in der Musik – Entwurf zu einer Methodologie musikwissenschaftlicher Rassenforschung. Wolfenbüttel: Kallmeyer 1939 and 1944.
- Wesen und Werden deutscher Musik, Kassel 1944
- Lasso und Palestrina, in Deutsche Musikkultur 9, 1944/45, p. 31–45.
- Johann Sebastian Bach im Wandel der Geschichte, Kassel 1948.
- Goethe und die Musik, Kassel 1948.
- Denkschrift zur Schulmusikerziehung, Bonn 1952.
- Was ist Musik? Ein Vortrag, Kassel 1959.
- Umrisse eines neuen Bach-Bildes, Kassel 1962.
- Renaissance and Baroque Music. A Comprehensive Survey, New York 1967.
- Der junge Bach, Wolfenbüttel 1967.
- Classic and Romantic Music. A Comprehensive Survey, New York 1970.
- Syntagma musicologicum. Gesammelte Reden und Schriften, Volume 1, ed. by Martin Ruhnke; volume 2, ed. by Anna Amalie Abert and Martin Ruhnke, Kassel 1963 (Vol. 1) and 1973 (Vol. 2).

== Editorials ==
- Die Musik in Geschichte und Gegenwart. Allgemeine Enzyklopädie der Musik with the cooperation of numerous music researchers in the region. Kassel; Basel; Tours; London: Bärenreiter. Volumes 1–14: 1949 to 1968 (The editorial Board of the supplement volumes and the Register volume – 1973, 1979 and 1986 – by Blumes daughter Ruth Blume)
- Gesamtausgabe der Werke von Michael Praetorius (with Fritz Jöde and Georg Kallmeyer, 1927 to 1940, Register 1960).
- Das Chorwerk (1929–1938; 1956 ff. with K. Gudewill).
- Gesammelte Schriften und Vorträge von Hermann Abert, Halle 1929; Reprint Tutzing 1968.

== Literary works ==
- Renaissance and Baroque Music – A Comprehensive Survey ISBN 978-0-393-09710-8 Publisher: W. W. Norton & Company 1967
- Classic and Romantic Music – A Comprehensive Survey ISBN 978-0-393-09868-6 Publisher: W. W. Norton & Company 1970
- Syntagma Musicologicum II Gesammelte Reden Und Schriften 1962–1972 ISBN 978-3-7618-0327-1 Publisher: Barenreiter Kassel 1973
- Protestant Church Music – A History ISBN 978-0-393-02176-9; Publisher: W. W. Norton 1974

== Sources ==
- Obituary notice (1976). The Musical Times, 117, 249.
- Thomas Phleps: Ein stiller, verbissener und zäher Kampf um Stetigkeit – Musikwissenschaft in NS-Deutschland und ihre vergangenheitspolitische Bewältigung, in Isolde v. Foerster et al. (ed.), Musikforschung – Nationalsozialismus – Faschismus, Mainz 2001, p. 471–488. online Uni Giessen
- Pamela M. Potter: Artikel Friedrich Blume in Musiklexikon The New Grove; New York: Oxford University Press 2001.
- Ludwig Finscher: Artikel Friedrich Blume in Musiklexikon MGG 2, Kassel 2000.
- Anna Amalie Abert, Wilhelm Pfannkuch (Hrsg.): Festschrift Friedrich Blume zum 70. Geburtstag. Kassel: Bärenreiter-Verlag 1963 (with Blume's Bibliographie of 1963)
- Isolde von Foerster, Christoph Hust, Christoph-Hellmut Mahling (Hrsg.): Musikforschung. Faschismus. Nationalsozialismus. Referate der Tagung Schloss Engers (8–11 March 2000). Mainz: Are Musik Verlag 2001. ISBN 3924522065
- Ralf Noltensmeier: Anmerkungen zur Musikwissenschaft an der Christian-Albrechts-Universität zwischen 1933 und 1945, in Hans-Werner Prahl (ed.): Uni-Formierung des Geistes. Universität Kiel im Nationalsozialismus, Vol. 1, Kiel: Malik Regional Verlag 1995, pp. 337–346. ISBN 3890299679
