= Die Musikforschung =

- Discipline: Musicology
- Language: German
- Edited by: Fabian Kolb, Wolfgang Fuhrmann, Gregor Herzfeld, Barbara Eichner

Publication details
- History: 1948-present
- Publisher: Bärenreiter on behalf of the Gesellschaft für Musikforschung (Germany)
- Frequency: Quarterly

Standard abbreviations
- ISO 4: Musikforschung

Indexing
- ISSN: 0027-4801
- LCCN: 51028227
- JSTOR: 00274801
- OCLC no.: 457009853

Links
- Journal homepage; Journal page on Society website; Online archive

Die Musikforschung is a quarterly peer-reviewed academic journal of musicology which since 1948 is published on behalf of the Gesellschaft für Musikforschung by Bärenreiter. The editors-in-chief are Fabian Kolb (Frankfurt University of Music and Performing Arts), Wolfgang Fuhrmann (Leipzig University), Gregor Herzfeld (University of Regensburg), and Barbara Eichner (Oxford Brookes University). The journal covers music history, theory, and practice. A review section discusses German and foreign-language books and scholarly editions of sheet music. Reports provide summaries of relevant congresses and conferences.

== Abstracting and indexing ==
The journal is abstracted and indexed in:

- Arts and Humanities Citation Index
- Current Contents/Arts & Humanities
- L'Année philologique
- Modern Language Association Database
- RILM Abstracts of Music Literature
- Scopus
