= Fred K. Prieberg =

German musicologist

Fred K. Prieberg (3 June 1928 in Berlin – 28 March 2010 in Neuried) was a German musicologist. He was a pioneer in the field of history of music and musicians under the Nazi regime.

== Works ==
=== Independent publications ===
- Musik unterm Strich. Panorama der neuen Musik. Alber, Freiburg im Breisgau / München 1956, Literature by and about Fred K. Prieberg in the German National Library catalogue.
- Musik des technischen Zeitalters. Atlantis, Zürich 1956.
- Lexikon der neuen Musik. Alber, Freiburg im Breisgau / München 1958; Neuauflage 1982, ISBN 3-495-47065-4.
- Musica ex machina. Über das Verhältnis von Musik und Technik. Ullstein, Berlin 1960.
  Musica ex Machina. (Translation into Italian: Paola Tonini). Einaudi, Turin 1963.
- Musik in der Sowjetunion. Verlag für Wissenschaft und Politik, Cologne 1965.
- Musik im anderen Deutschland. Verlag für Wissenschaft und Politik, Cologne 1968.
- Musik und Musikpolitik in Schweden. Herrenberg, Döring 1976.
- EM – Versuch einer Bilanz der elektronischen Musik. Rohrdorfer Musikverlag, Rohrdorf 1980, ISBN 3-922438-15-6.
- Musik im NS-Staat. Fischer Taschenbuch Verlag, Frankfurt/M. 1982, ISBN 3-596-26901-6.
  New edition: Dittrich, Cologne 2000, ISBN 3-920862-66-X.
- Kraftprobe. Wilhelm Furtwängler im Dritten Reich. Brockhaus, Wiesbaden 1986, ISBN 3-7653-0370-4.
  Trial of strength. Wilhelm Furtwängler and the Third Reich. (translation in English: Christopher Dolan). Verlag Quartet Books, London 1991, ISBN 0-7043-2790-2. / Verlag Northeastern University Press, Boston 1994, ISBN 1-55553-196-2.
- Musik und Macht. Fischer Taschenbuch Verlag, Frankfurt am Main 1991, ISBN 3-596-10954-X.
- Mißbrauchte Tonkunst. Musik als Machtmedium. dtv, Munich 1991, ISBN 3-423-04556-6.
- Der Komponist Hans Schaeuble: daß ich nicht vertreten bin…; ein biographischer Essay. With a catalogue of works by Chris Walton. published by the Hans-Schaeuble-Stiftung. Amadeus, Winterthur 2002
- Handbuch Deutsche Musiker 1933–1945. PDF auf CD-ROM, Kiel 2004. (2nd edition, Kiel 2009)
  Archiv-Inventar Deutsche Musik 1933–1945. (Auskopplung aus dem Handbuch). PDF o, CD-ROM, Kiel 2004. (2nd edition, Kiel 2009)

=== Further publications ===
- Es gibt keine „neue“ Musik. In: Melos. Zeitschrift für zeitgenössische Musik. Schott, Mainz 1954, p. 310ff.
- Honeggers elektronisches Experiment. In: Melos. Zeitschrift für zeitgenössische Musik. Schott, Mainz 1956, p. 20ff.
- Die Emanzipation des Geräusches. In: Melos. Zeitschrift für zeitgenössische Musik. Schott, Mainz 1957, p. 9ff.
- Musikbücher. In: Melos. Zeitschrift für zeitgenössische Musik. Schott, Mainz 1958, p. 91ff.
- Der musikalische Futurismus. In: Melos. Zeitschrift für zeitgenössische Musik. Schott, Mainz 1958, p. 124ff.
- Italiens elektronische Musik. In: Melos. Zeitschrift für zeitgenössische Musik. Schott, Mainz 1958, p. 194ff.
- Besuch in Polen. In: Melos. Zeitschrift für zeitgenössische Musik. Schott, Mainz 1959, p. 43ff.
- Blick auf die Neue Musik mit Zeittafel der Neuen Musik. In: Prisma der gegenwärtigen Musik. Tendenzen und Probleme des zeitgenössischen Schaffens. Edited by Joachim E. Berendt and Jürgen Uhde. Furche, Hamburg 1959.
- García Lorca in der Neuen Musik. In: Melos. Zeitschrift für zeitgenössische Musik. Schott, Mainz 1960, p. 331ff.
- Kunst und staatlviche Kontrolle. Beitrag zu einer Diskussion. In: Deutsche Rundschau (with a catalogue of works by Chris Walton (edited by Jürgen und Peter Pechel). Verlag Deutsche Rundschau, Baden-Baden 1962,
  88. Jg., H. 11 November 1962.
- Elektronische Musik aus Lochstreifen. In: Melos. Zeitschrift für zeitgenössische Musik. Schott, Mainz 1964, Heft 4, p. 118ff.
- Der junge Schönberg und seine Kritiker. In: Melos. Zeitschrift für zeitgenössische Musik. Schott, Mainz 1964, p. 264ff.
- Imaginäres Gespräch mit Luciano Berio. In: Melos. Zeitschrift für zeitgenössische Musik. Schott, Mainz 1965, p. 158ff.
- Musik als sozialpolitische Erscheinung. Beispiel Schweden. In: Melos. Zeitschrift für zeitgenössische Musik. Schott, Mainz 1972, p.334ff.
- Zwanzig Fragen an Milko Kelemen. In: Melos. Zeitschrift für zeitgenössische Musik. Schott, Mainz 1974, p. 65ff.
- Schweden – Muster oder Monster des Musiklebens? In: Melos/Neue Zeitschrift für Musik Schott, Mainz 1977, Heft 2, p. 123ff.
- Die Rolle des Musikschaffenden im NS-Staat. In: Aspekte der Musik im NS-Staat. Hrsg. vom AStA der Staatlichen Hochschule für Musik Rheinland (S. Kames and M. Pannes; reproduced as manuscript), Cologne 1984.
- Nach dem „Endsieg“ oder Musik-Mimikry. In: Hanns-Werner Heister, Hans-Günter Klein: Musik und Musikpolitik im faschistischen Deutschland. Fischer Taschenbuch Verlag, Frankfurt/M. 1984, ISBN 3-596-26902-4.
- Foreword and comments on Berta Geissmar: Musik im Schatten der Politik. Erinnerungen. Atlantis, Zürich 1985, 4th edition, ISBN 3-254-00120-6, as well as the new edition under the title: Taktstock und Schaftstiefel. Erinnerungen an Wilhelm Furtwängler. Dittrich, Cologne 2000, ISBN 3-920862-10-4.

=== Translations from English ===
- Erle Stanley Gardner: Hubschrauber, Höhlen, Hindernisse: Flug zu den geheimnisvollen Schluchten Kaliforniens. Ullstein, Berlin 1962.
- Joy Adamson: Für immer frei. Ullstein, Berlin 1964.
- Lawrence Langner: Vom Sinn und Unsinn der Kleidung. With a foreword by Hans Habe. Ullstein 1964.
- John Fairchild: Magier, Meister und Modelle. Modeschöpfer und Mode-Idole von heute. Lorch, Frankfurt/M. 1967.

=== Reviews of his work ===
- "Besprechung von Musik im NS-Staat". Der Spiegel. February 15, 1982.
- Besprechung von Kraftprobe. Wilhelm Furtwängler im Dritten Reich von Carl Dahlhaus. In: Die Zeit dated 7 November 1986.
- Peter Brixius: Entdeckungsreise in unbewältigte Vergangenheit. Fred K. Priebergs „Handbuch Deutscher Musiker 1933–1945“. In: neue musikzeitung, April 2005, p. 45.
- Fred K. Prieberg weiß alles über Musiker im Dritten Reich von Jens Malte Fischer. In: Die Welt 12 August 2006.
