= Die Musik in Geschichte und Gegenwart =

German music encyclopedia

- Author: Multiple
- Language: German
- Subject: Music (musicology, ethnomusicology, music history, music theory)
- Genre: Reference; Encyclopedic dictionary
- Publisher: Bärenreiter
- Publication date: from 1949 (first edition); from 1994 (second edition); from 2016 (online edition)
- Publication place: Germany
- Media type: hardback, paperback, and online

Die Musik in Geschichte und Gegenwart (MGG; "Music in the Past and Present") is a German music encyclopedia. It is among the world's most comprehensive encyclopedias of music history and musicology, on account of its scope, content, wealth of research areas, and reference to related subjects. It has appeared in two self-contained printed editions and a continuously updated and expanding digital edition, titled MGG Online.

Created by Karl Vötterle, the founder of Bärenreiter-Verlag, and Friedrich Blume, professor of musicology at Kiel University, the first edition was published by Bärenreiter-Verlag in Kassel from 1949 through 1986, comprising a total of 17 volumes (MGG1; numbered in columns) and reprinted in paperback in 1989. As early as 1989, its new editor Ludwig Finscher began planning a second, revised edition with 29 volumes, which were published from 1994 through 2008 in cooperation with the publisher J.B. Metzler (MGG2; with a topical part in 9 volumes and a persons part in 17 volumes, a supplement and two index volumes, all numbered in columns). As the result of a collaboration between the above publishers and Répertoire International de Littérature Musicale (RILM) in New York, MGG entered the digital world as MGG Online, with Laurenz Lütteken as its editor-in-chief.

== Genesis and Scope ==
Karl Vötterle began planning MGG with the creation of "a comprehensive keyword index" in 1942, which was completed in the following year. He had intended Friedrich Blume to be the editor. This material, which was saved from a fire at Kiel University in July 1944, was further developed at the musicological institute of Kiel University. But it was not until 1948 that the project became more concrete: Taking into account the given economic circumstances, the initial plans involved the publication of 112-page booklets every few months, the first of which came out in 1949. However, this system was soon abandoned, as the initial booklets were consolidated into the first bound volume in 1951, followed by the second volume in 1952. Friedrich Blume's work was supported by an editorial board, which in the early days included acclaimed musicologists Anna Amalie Abert and Hans Albrecht. In 1957–58, Wilifried Brennecke (as head of the editorial board) and Hans Haase joined. Friedrich Blume's daughter Ruth took over in 1964, after Brennecke took a position at the Westdeutscher Rundfunk in Cologne.

The original goal of the encyclopedia was "to reassure oneself (also) of the musical culture in an environment that was increasingly shaped by war and destruction." In doing so, Blume argued, one should not shy away from accepting the "contradictions and problems [...]" as well as "ruptures [...] and continuities" as a consequence of postwar mentalities and thereby also dare to start anew. In the preface to MGG1, Blume emphasized the large number of "music researchers from all countries". The relatively long gestation and publication span can be explained by the extensive content of the encyclopedia and associated labor.

The model for MGG, clearly recognizable from the title, was the encyclopedia Die Religion in Geschichte und Gegenwart (RGG, Religion past and present), even though Friedrich Blume did not mention it in the foreword to the first bound volume of 1951. The title Die Musik in Geschichte und Gegenwart (Music past and present) reveals the claim and scope of the new encyclopedia. It avoided all combinations or derivations of the term "music" and thus emphasized its entire spectrum. The formulation "past and present" used by RGG became integrated into MGG's title, with the addition of "encyclopedia" as a subtitle to distinguish it from purely lexical undertakings." Paul Henry Lang later described the aim of MGG as the amalgamation of knowledge that itself produces knowledge, as "breaking the horizon".

== Editions ==
=== First edition: MGG1 ===
As Friedrich Blume writes in the preface to the first volume of MGG1, the large scope of MGG1 was anticipated, and the selection of subject headings deliberately generous: In addition to common topics and personal names, numerous new keywords were chosen that had not been included in previous reference works. These encompassed genres, cities, countries, theorists, areas of chant and medieval research, as well as lesser-known figures from the Middle Ages and the early modern period through to folk music. Keywords from related disciplines such as philosophy, acoustics, theology, and literature were also integrated. Information and the state of research in relation to well-known figures was brought up to date, in many cases pioneering work on sources. Given its long publication span, MGG decided to publish two supplemental volumes (the second of which appeared after Blume's death) and an index volume for which Elisabeth and Harald Heckmann were responsible.

Not only was the selection of article topics of particular importance, the hierarchy of the individual entries as reflected in the scope and layout of the articles was significant as well. The articles were supplemented by an unusually rich amount of illustrations, with the first 14 volumes alone containing 7100 images.

This risky project could only be undertaken because of the large number of subscribers it attracted right from the start. After the publication was completed, an unaltered paperback reprint was published in 1989, a collaboration between Bärenreiter-Verlag and dtv Verlagsgesellschaft, which was available for purchase without a subscription.

MGG1 was a product of the postwar period, with the first volume appearing before the re-establishment of regulated statehood. In addition to the factual and logistical achievement and challenges, the project was characterized by continuities from the prewar and Nazi eras (palpable in the embellished autobiographies of musicologists such as that of Wolfgang Boetticher from 1952), but also by emphatic and new global approaches (notable, for example, in the evident determination to include émigrés, spectacularly so in Hanoch Avenary's 1958 monumental 60-column article on Jewish music).

Given the initial circumstances, a certain focus on Europe was unavoidable. Nevertheless, from the very beginning Blume aimed for an international and even global outlook, evident from the third volume onward and aided by gradually stabilizing communication channels.

=== Second edition: MGG2 ===
With the sixth edition of The New Grove Dictionary of Music and Musicians in 1980, the content of MGG1, which was completed in 1968, did not become obsolete, but rather clarified the "need for a new version". The decision to have MGG published as a new edition also meant leaving the war and post-war period behind. Furthermore, it had become obvious that "the extraordinary differentiation and specialization of the subject in the [previous] decades [...] had generated an urge for a renewed [...] overview". Accordingly, the decision was made to publish a second edition of MGG in the early 1980s, a collaboration between the publishers Bärenreiter and Metzler, who had merged to form their own civil-law partnership (Gesellschaft bürgerlichen Rechts, GbR). Its editor-in-chief was Ludwig Finscher, with Andreas Jaschinski as the editorial director. In addition, Ruth Blume was initially involved in MGG2’s conceptualization. Ilka Sührig succeeded Andreas Jaschinski after his unexpected death in 2005. The editors and editorial staff were supported by subject- and geography-specific advisory boards, each of which concentrated on one or more areas.

The most important outward change in the second edition was the division into a topical and a persons part. In addition, MGG1's concept was completely reimagined: The proportion of comprehensive, encyclopedic articles increased significantly, and the diversification of subjects was reflected in the expansions in the fields of music anthropology, popular music, dance research—and especially music ethnology, for which completely new and extremely comprehensive topical articles were written. However, conceptual changes were also reflected in traditional subjects; articles on musical epochs were no longer merely dealt with as such, but transmuted into "representations that make the traditional handling of epoch concepts themselves the subject of reflection". In addition, historical changes of the past 30 years had to be taken into account in the revision of articles.

For the persons part, articles that had already been included in MGG1 were shortened, expanded, or even deleted, and new personal subject headings were added. The 20th century was of particular importance, not least because of the open address of political entanglements and even perpetration that was now being sought. The new second edition does not replace the first, but may be viewed as a further development and its extension—especially because many of the older and newly replaced articles (e.g., in the case of epochs) are of great historical relevance in relation to the development of the discipline.

Overall, the topical part of MGG2 contains over 1300 subject headings on countries, regions, cities, sources, institutions, genres, instruments, music iconography, and the interrelationships between music and other arts. The persons part includes over 18,000 keywords on composers, singers, performers, poets, music theorists, publishers, ensembles, instrument makers, librettists, philosophers, musicologists, and stage directors. The supplement primarily addresses new developments in music history and musicology, including articles on gender studies, new simplicity, sound art, and world music.

Over 3500 authors from over 55 countries have contributed to the articles.

While MGG1 featured a table of contents and a list of the authors involved, which were appended to each volume (including photo credits), the commitment of the publisher's extensive network of advisors remained veiled. In MGG2, on the other hand, the scholarly advisory board is listed at the beginning of each volume. By the publication of the last regular volume, the editor Ludwig Finscher and the publishing house Bärenreiter had gone separate ways, which is why the supplemental volume was published by the editorial board, with Ilka Sührig as editorial director. The completion of MGG2 was celebrated in 2007 during the 18th Congress of the International Musicological Society at the aula of Zurich University. It also attracted a great deal of attention outside the boundaries of music studies, as was evident from a series of extremely positive reviews.

=== MGG Online ===
As early as 2000, "first thoughts about an online version" arose. The publishers sought a partner experienced in digital musicology and eventually entered a partnership with RILM (Répertoire International de Littérature Musicale). As with MGG1 and MGG2, the editorial board of MGG Online is based at Bärenreiter-Verlag in Kassel, while software development, sales, and marketing are managed by RILM in New York City. In addition to the editor-in-chief Laurenz Lütteken, the editorial director Ilka Sührig, and the editorial staff, there is an editorial advisory board and a scholarly advisory board. Similar to MGG2, the scholarly advisory board covers centuries, countries, and various specialized fields such as gender research, jazz, performers, and dance.

Preparatory work for the new edition began in 2013, and MGG Online (www.mgg-online.com) was officially launched at the joint annual conference of the American Musicological Society and Society for Music Theory in Vancouver in November 2016. MGG Online is based on the keyword inventory of MGG2, and featured a large number of updated articles and data already at its launch.

MGG Online is not simply a digital version of the MGG2, but rather a new digital encyclopedia based on MGG2. Institutions and individuals can subscribe to MGG Online on an annual basis. The site offers a wealth of different research and archiving options, along with dynamic features such as selected articles of the month, articles of the day, and a timeline feature. News posts and an email newsletter for subscribers provide additional information. The user interface is not only available in German, but also in English. Moreover, the content can be translated into over 100 languages using the integrated Google translation program. Several versions of articles (MGG2 version, updated, and/or new version(s)) are accessible throughout the encyclopedia.

MGG Online is a living product that is constantly changing, renewing, and expanding. In annual update cycles, new articles are added (new entries), existing articles are rewritten (newly written), or fundamentally revised (major update). In addition, there are a large number of smaller changes (minor revisions), which are primarily visible in the continuous updating of life data on the site's landing page. New entries and newly written articles reflect the developments in the discipline, notable, for instance, in the considerable expansion of articles on popular music and contemporary performers, as well as in the complete reorientation of entries on cities and countries. The expansion of the repertoire of subject headings is the result of long-term planning in collaboration with the members of the advisory board.

MGG Online is characterized by adapting the strict editing principles of a scholarly encyclopedia to the digital medium. It is about ensuring "the controlled, comprehensible, and authorized generation of musical knowledge with clear responsibilities and clear demarcations". This includes:

- "individual authorship with clearly assigned responsibilities"
- "very clear and sophisticated mechanisms of control, testing, and regulation by a multitude of supervisory bodies (editorial staff, editors, advisory boards, publishers)"
- "ordering hierarchies of knowledge and the knowable"
- "clearly contoured contexts, combined with manageable, or at least comprehensible limits in quantity and standards in quality"

A wealth of mechanisms is intended to ensure compliance with these editing principles. There is also the possibility of direct error messages sent by users.

The collaboration with RILM was an important step in the creation of MGG Online. RILM specializes in converting textual data, building platforms, and managing databanks. In MGG Online, person-specific data is linked to RILM's authority data as well as that of various libraries. The collaboration with RILM also enables a synergy effect in relation to bibliographic research.

== Bibliography ==
1. Albrecht, Michael von (1997). [untitled review]. International Journal of Musicology 6. 449–452.
2. Badley, A. (2017). [untitled review]. Fontes Artis Musicae, 64(3). 312–314.
3. Beirat. ("Advisory board") (n.d.). MGG Online. accessed on May 1, 2022
4. Blume, F. (1968). Nachwort des Herausgebers. In F. Blume (ed.) Die Musik in Geschichte und Gegenwart (1st. ed), 14, x–xxxiv.
5. — Vorwort. (1951). In F. Blume (ed.) Die Musik in Geschichte und Gegenwart (1st. ed), 1. v-ix.
6. — Vorwort. (1973). In F. Blume (ed.) Die Musik in Geschichte und Gegenwart (1st. ed), 15. v-viii.
7. Die Musik in Geschichte und Gegenwart. (n.d.). Bärenreiter. accessed May 1, 2022
8. Eichholz, N. (2017). [untitled review]. Forum Musikbibliothek 38(2). 63–64.
9. Finscher, L. Vorwort. (1994). In L. Finscher (ed) Die Musik in Geschichte und Gegenwart (2nd ed.) 1. viii-x.
10. Gülke, P. (2020). Noch einmal mit Gewühl (tr. "Once again with hustle and bustle"). Frankfurter Allgemeine Zeitung. accessed on May 1, 2022
11. Hagedorn, V. (1999). Ein Zauberberg der Töne: Die ersten zehn Bände der größten deutschen Musikenzyklopädie sind fertig. Die Zeit. November 11, 1999, 11.
12. History (n.d.). RILM. accessed April 28, 2021, www.rilm.org
13. Janke, A. (2018). Review: MGG Online: Die Musik in Geschichte und Gegenwart. Journal of the American Musicological Society, 71(2). 551–560.
14. Lang, P. H. (1979). Epilog. In Friedrich Blume (ed.) Die Musik in Geschichte und Gegenwart (vol. 1), 16. Transl. by Alfred Mann. xviii-xxv.
15. MGG Online Launch Presentation (AMS 2016): Laurenz Lütteken. (2016). RILM Resources, via YouTube. accessed on May 1, 2022
16. Lütteken, L. (2008). Epilog. In L. Finscher (ed.): Die Musik in Geschichte und Gegenwart (2nd ed.), supplement. Supplementband. xv-xxi.
17. — (2016). Preface. MGG Online. accessed on May 1, 2022
18. — (2018) Weltsprache Musik? Selbstverständnis und Geltungsanspruch der ersten MGG. In K. Pietschmann (Ed.) Symposiumsbericht "Wege des Faches – Wege der Forschung?" (pp. 1–8). Schott.
19. Nettl, B. (1995). [untitled review]. The World of Music, 37(2). 103–105.
20. Rehm, W. (1979). Schlussbemerkung. In: F. Blume (ed.) Die Musik in Geschichte und Gegenwart (1st. ed.), 16. xxvi.
21. Schnaus, P. (1995). [untitled review]. In Neue Zeitschrift für Musik 156(2). 74–76.
22. Sührig, I. (2008): Vorwort. In L. Finscher (ed.) Die Musik in Geschichte und Gegenwart, (2nd edition), supplement. xiii-xiv.
23. Testimonials. (n.d.). MGG Online. accessed on April 28, 2021
24. Unser Team. (n.d.). MGG Online. accessed on April 28, 2021
25. Vötterle, K. (1968). Nachwort des Verlegers. In F. Blume (ed.) Die Musik in Geschichte und Gegenwart (1st ed.), 14. xxxv-xxxvi.
