= Bärenreiter =

German classical music publisher

- Founded: 1923
- Founder: Karl Vötterle
- Country of origin: Germany
- Headquarters location: Kassel
- Key people: Barbara Scheuch-Vötterle; Leonhard Scheuch; Clemens Scheuch
- Publication types: Sheet music
- Official website: baerenreiter.com

Bärenreiter (Bärenreiter-Verlag) is a German classical music publishing house based in Kassel. The firm was founded by Karl Vötterle (1903–1975) in Augsburg in 1923, and moved to Kassel in 1927, where it still has its headquarters; it also has offices in Basel, London, New York and Prague. The company is currently managed by Barbara Scheuch-Vötterle, Leonhard Scheuch and Clemens Scheuch.

Since 1951, Bärenreiter has expanded its production through acquisitions and the creation of subsidiaries. From this time, the company's focus has been on the New Complete Editions series for various composers. These are urtext editions, and cover the entire work of the selected composer. Series include: J. S. Bach (the Neue Bach-Ausgabe, a joint project with the Deutscher Verlag für Musik), Berlioz, Fauré, Gluck, Handel, Janáček, Mozart (Neue Mozart-Ausgabe), Rossini, Saint-Saëns, Schubert (New Schubert Edition), Telemann and others.

== Amateur theater ==
For decades, Bärenreiter published hundreds of titles for community theaters, schools, and church groups. The selection numbered 333 plays in 1959. The initiative was closely connected to the editor and dramatist Rudolf Mirbt.

== History ==
=== 1923 to 1940 ===
The publication house was established in 1923 by Karl Vötterle in the city of Augsburg. One of its initial publications was the "Finkensteiner Blätter" which was overseen by editor Walther Hensel. In 1927, the publishing house relocated to the city of Kassel.

Vötterle released the first sheet music (known as Liederblätter) at a time when the great composers of the Classical, Romantic and Modern eras were exclusively represented by traditional publishers in Leipzig (such as Edition Peters) and Mainz (Schott-Verlag). New trends arose, resulting in a growing demand for sheet music for the youth music movement (Jugendmusikbewegug), recorder and organ pieces, and the revival of music by Heinrich Schütz and early musical works predating Johann Sebastian Bach. Focus shifted towards providing complete editions of famous composers such as Bach, Georg Friedrich Händel, Wolfgang Amadeus Mozart and Franz Schubert, making Bärenreiter a leading supplier of sheet music among publishers in the same field.

From the early 1900s through to the 21st century, Bärenreiter's publishing programme has been built upon converting these editions into sheet music suitable for practice and performance. The catalogue includes a wide range of classical music genres, including piano, chamber, symphonic, and operatic works, as well as vocal and choral pieces. In addition, the company publishes domestic and popular music, as well as unearthing new pieces in the realm of liturgical music. For instance, the 1930 Quempas (collection of Christmas carols with a current circulation of 3 million copies) has been a cornerstone of the company's success. In 1932, a collaboration with Hugo Distler was initiated, and in 1933, the Working Group for House Music (Arbeitskreis für Hausmusik, later known as the International Working Group for Music (Internationaler Arbeitskreis für Musik) was established. This group organised the first Kassel Music Days (Kasseler Musiktage) in the autumn of the same founding year. The company also launched the series The Heritage of German Music (Das Erbe deutscher Musik) in 1936.

Between 1929 and 1950, the publisher also commissioned the production of a unique series of recorders ranging from sopranino to large bass, as well as solo flutes in alto and soprano sizes, and even school flutes. The first models were built by Max Hüller. New models that followed from the year of 1936 were designed by Manfred Ruetz, built in cooperation with Max Hüller and Rudolf Otto. By 1945 the Hüller and Otto partnership dissolved and from 1950 Conrad Mollenhauer company, based in Fulda, had taken over instrument production.

=== 1940 to 1960 ===
In 1944, due to the impending closure of the Kassel publishing house, Bärenreiter established itself in Basel, Switzerland. In 1945, the publishing house buildings in Kassel were destroyed by air raids. Despite this setback, the first volumes of Music in History and the Present (Die Musik in Geschichte und Gegenwart) were published in 1949.

In 1950, Bärenreiter acquired Hinnenthal publishing house and began releasing the "Hortus Musicus" series featuring works from the Renaissance and Baroque eras. The following year, in 1952, Bärenreiter also took over Nagel's music publishing house in Celle.

Notably, 1954 saw the release of the first two volumes of the New Bach Edition and the commencement of work on the New Mozart Edition. In 1955, Alkor-Edition (formerly known as Brucknerverlag, founded in 1934) became part of Bärenreiter-Verlag. The publication of the first volume of the Hallische Handel Edition, the first volume of the Mozart Edition, and the updated edition of all of Heinrich Schütz's works were also published. During this time, the company began collaborating with renowned Austrian-American composer Ernst Krenek.

In 1957, Bärenreiter acquired Gustav Bosse publishing house, followed by the founding of Bärenreiter New York in 1958. In order to make works from their publishing program accessible through recordings, the record company "Bärenreiter-Musicaphon" was established by 1960.

=== 1960 to 1980 ===
In 1962, Bärenreiter Sàrl., Paris, (later relocated to Tours from 1971 until 1980) was established. In the same year, the Wolfgang Amadeus Mozart Edition was published, the edition included letters and notes from the composer, which spanned seven volumes until 1975. The following year, in 1963, Bärenreiter Ltd London (now located in Harlow/Essex) was founded, and in 1964, a comprehensive Schubert edition was printed.

In 1965 a Disco-Center was created to produce records for the "Cantate" and "Musicaphon" Bärenreiter labels, along with over thirty other record companies. An important milestone was reached in 1966 with the publication of the first volume of Franz Berwald's complete works. Additionally, the New Berlioz Edition was published in 1967. In 1971, the company initiated a collaboration with prominent German paperback publisher Deutscher Taschenbuch-Verlag.

After over 52 years of oversight, in 1975 Karl Vötterle, the director of the publishing company, died. He was succeeded in his role by Barbara Scheuch-Vötterle, his daughter. The management team was further expanded in 1976 with the addition of Leonhard Scheuch, Scheuch-Vötterle's husband. During this period, Offenbach's The Tales of Hoffmann were performed for the first time by Fritz Oeser in the Alkor edition, at the Vienna Volksoper. In 1977, Franz Schubert's songs were printed in collaboration with G. Henle Verlag, and the first volumes of the complete edition of the works of Czech composer Leoš Janáček were circulated in 1979 as part of a co-production with Supraphon Prague.

=== 1980 to 2000 ===
Between 1988 and 2000, Bärenreiter underwent significant developments that enhanced its position in the music publishing industry. In 1988, the company acquired Süddeutscher Musikverlag, expanding its catalog. In 1991, the main series of the Mozart Edition music volumes was completed, accompanied by the publication of a 20-volume paperback edition. During the same year, Bärenreiter took over the stage distributor Henschel Musik, founded Nakladatelství Bärenreiter Praha, and began the privatisation of Edition Supraphon Praha.

Following German reunification, the company assumed sole responsibility for the Bach Edition and the Hallische Händel Edition, which had previously been co-published with Deutscher Verlag für Musik Leipzig.

In 1992, the Messe solennelle by Hector Berlioz was rediscovered, while 1993 saw the relocation of Gustav Bosse Verlag to Kassel. In 1994, Bärenreiter published the first volume of the subject section of the second edition of the music encyclopaedia Die Musik in Geschichte und Gegenwart (MGG). The following year, work commenced on the complete edition of the works of Niels Wilhelm Gade, co-produced with Engstrøm & Sødring, and in 1996, the complete edition of Orlando di Lasso’s works was finalised.

In 1997, Bärenreiter initiated a new edition of Beethoven's symphonies, edited by Jonathan Del Mar, and published the Johann Strauss Complete Edition in collaboration with Strauss Edition Wien. In 1998, the company acquired shares in Editio Supraphon Praha, solidifying its presence in Prague. The period culminated in 2000 with the completion of the main part of the New Bach Edition.

=== 2000 to 2009 ===
Published works:

- 2006 – Mendelssohn's Three Motets Op. 69, in their Bärenreiter Urtext series
- 2007 – Mendelssohn's a cappella Psalm settings Op. posth. 78, Nos. 1–3
- 2008 – Mendelssohn's St Paul
- 2010 – Final (1843) version of Mendelssohn's Die erste Walpurgisnacht

=== 2010 to 2019 ===
In 2010, Bärenreiter began publishing the complete edition of Gabriel Fauré's works. The following year, Clemens Scheuch joined the management board of Bärenreiter Verlag. Bärenreiter then entered into a partnership with Henschel Verlag (Leipzig) for the publication of music books in 2012. That same year, the first volume of the Edition Francesco Cavalli - Opere, featuring operas by the Italian Baroque composer Francesco Cavalli (1602–1676), was released.

In 2013, Bärenreiter launched the edition project OPERA - Spektrum des europäischen Musiktheaters in Einzeleditionenwith Prima la musica e poi le parole, an opera by Giambattista Casti (libretto) and Antonio Salieri (music). Each volume of this series includes a printed score and a digital component (Edirom) containing the score, source material (notes and text), and a critical report.

In March 2014, Bärenreiter introduced its first independent digital product, the Bärenreiter Study Score Reader, an iPad app enabling users to study scores of significant works from music history. This app became available through the Apple iTunes Store. The publisher expanded its digital offerings in 2015 by introducing e-books.

Since November 2016, the second edition of the music encyclopedia Die Musik in Geschichte und Gegenwart (MGG), originally published between 1994 and 2008, has been available as an online database, MGG Online. This platform was developed in collaboration with RILM and the publishing house J.B. Metzler. In the same year, Bärenreiter initiated a major new project: the historical-critical edition of all the instrumental works of the French composer Camille Saint-Saëns.

=== 2020-2023 ===
The coronavirus pandemic significantly impacted Bärenreiter Verlag, as the reduction in opera, concert, and choir performances led to a loss of revenue. In early 2021, Clemens Scheuch was appointed as the third managing director of the publishing house, joining his parents Barbara Scheuch-Vötterle and Leonhard Scheuch in the leadership team.

In 2022, during the Schütz memorial year, Bärenreiter, in collaboration with Carus-Verlag, was awarded the International Heinrich Schütz Prize. This recognition honored their contributions to preserving and disseminating the works of the Baroque composer Heinrich Schütz.
