= Zornlin =

Zornlin is a surname. Notable people with this surname include:

- Georgiana Zornlin (1800–1881), British writer and artist
- Rosina Zornlin (1795–1859), British author
