= Jesus Christus nostra salus =

Hymn in Ecclesiastical Latin

- Hymn
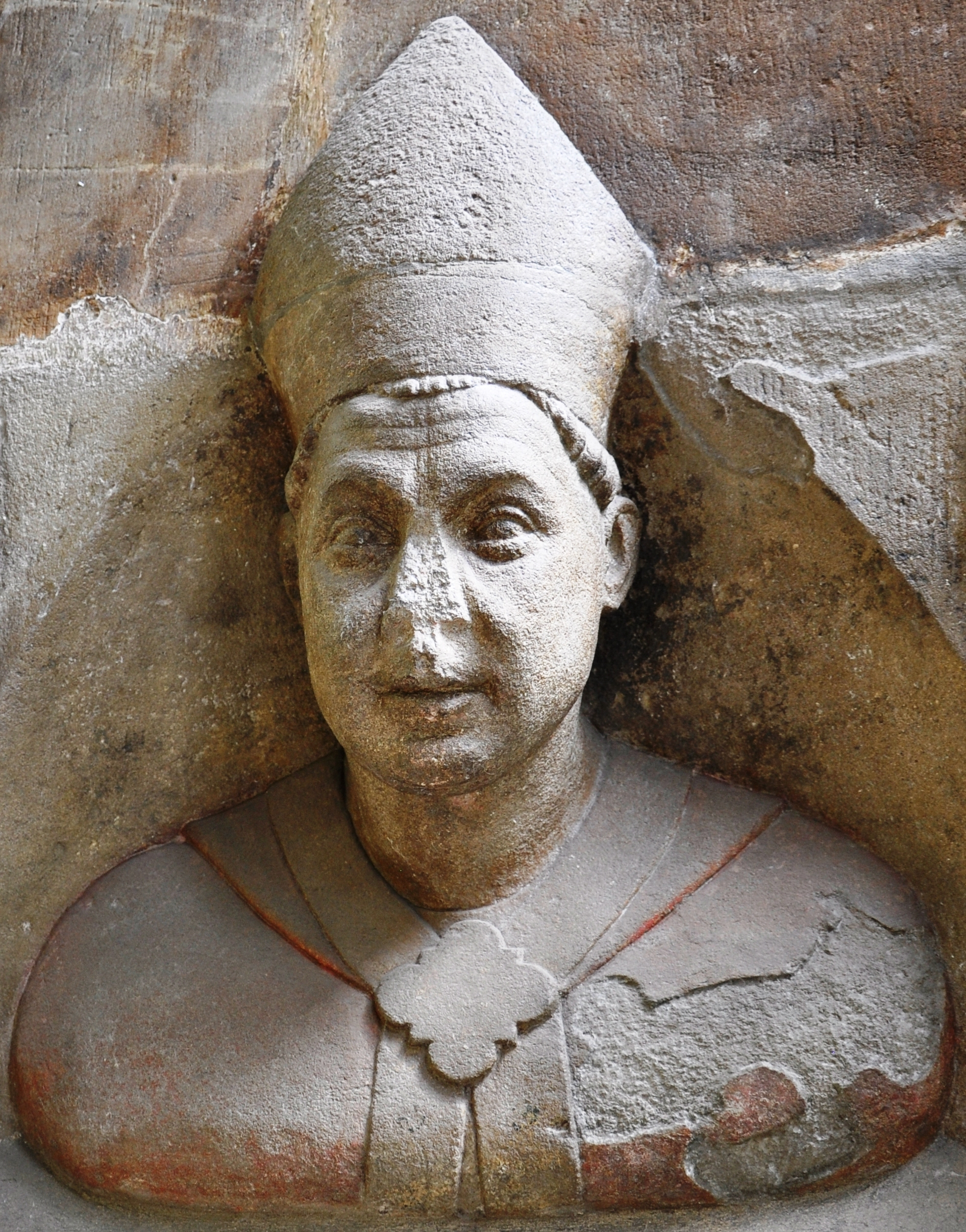
- Jan of Jenštejn, bust at the Prague Cathedral, where the hymn-writer was archbishop
- English: Jesus Christus, our salvation
- Related: basis for "Jesus Christus, unser Heiland, der von uns den Gotteszorn wandt" (1524)
- Written: before 1410
- Text: Jan of Jenštejn; attributed to Johannes Hus
- Language: Latin

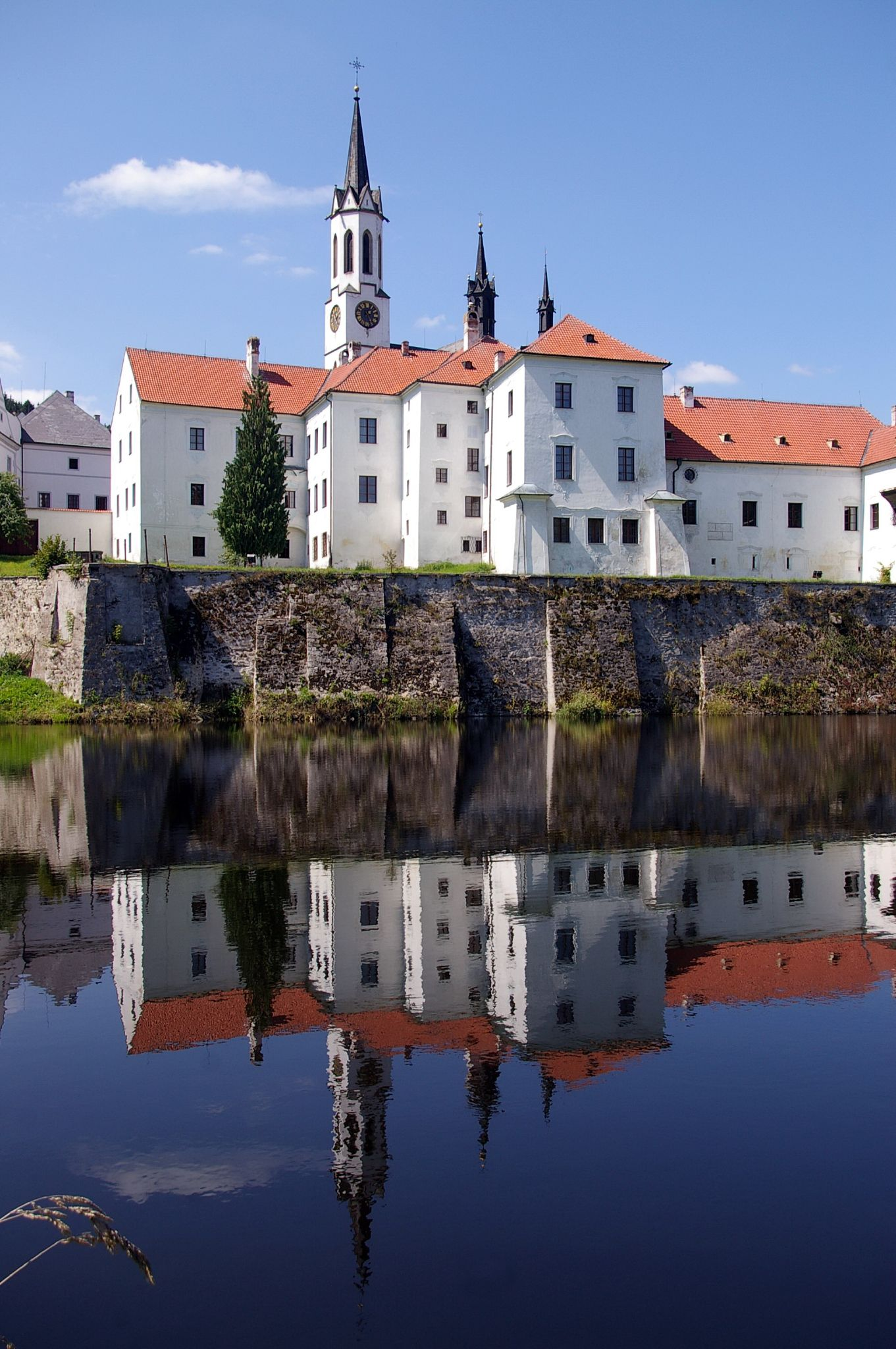
The monastery in Hohenfurth, where the earliest extant copy of the hymn was found

"Jesus Christus nostra salus" (English: Jesus Christ, our salvation) is a hymn in Ecclesiastical Latin celebrating the Eucharist. It first is confirmed to have appeared in a manuscript in 1410. For a long time it was attributed to Johannes Hus, but was more likely written by the Archbishop of Prague, Jan of Jenštejn. Several hymns in different languages were derived from it, among others Martin Luther's "Jesus Christus, unser Heiland, der von uns den Gotteszorn wandt".

== History ==
The earliest extant version of the hymn is contained in a 1410 manuscript from the Cistercian abbey of Hohenfurth (Vyšší Brod Monastery). In that version, it has ten stanzas of four lines each, and a refrain of praise. The first eight stanzas form an acrostic on the name JOHANNES (John). Possibly the eight acrostic stanzas were a first version which was expanded by two more stanzas and the refrain. The hymn is in content comparable to the 13th century Lauda Sion Salvatorem. It is focused on the eucharist and the presence of Christ in bread and wine.

According to modern research, the text was written by Jan of Jenštejn, archbishop of Prague, in the late 14th century. A Czech language version of the hymn exists: this version probably originated in the 15th century.

The melody of the hymn also appears in Hohenfurth 1410. The melody may go back to the 13th century.

The hymn was sung and distributed by the Hussite Bohemian Brethren. During the Reformation, it was considered as a work of the early reformer and martyr Johannes Hus and was printed in collections of his works.

== After the 15th century ==
Martin Luther's "Jesus Christus, unser Heiland, der von uns den Gotteszorn wandt", first published in 1524, was based on "Jesus Christus nostra salus". Luther's hymn appeared under the header "Das Lied S. Johannes Hus gebessert" (The song of St. Johannes Hus improved).

A choral setting of the hymn by Thomas Stoltzer is contained in Sacrorum hymnorum, Book I, published by Georg Rhau in 1542.

In Finland, "Iesus Christus nostra salus" was published as No. 39 in the 1582 first edition of the Piae Cantiones (No. 21 in a 1910 UK republication). In Finnish the hymn translates as "Jeesus Kristus Elämämme". In Swedish, hymns Jesus Kristus är vår hälsa (1589) and "Jesus Christus, lunastajam" (1609) were based on "Jesus Christus nostra salus".

An English translation by R. F. Littledale, "Jesus Christ our true salvation", appeared in Lyra Eucharistica in 1864.

== Discography ==
- Jesus Christus nostra salus in Music of Charles University, Vol. 2: Czech Music of the 14th and 15th Centuries by Ars Cameralis (Studio Matouš, 1993)
- Jesus Christus nostra salus, PC 1582 / Leipzig UB in Piae Cantiones: Latin Song in Medieval Finland performed by an ensemble directed by Markus Tapio (Naxos, 1998)
