= Lied =

Art song in the classical music tradition

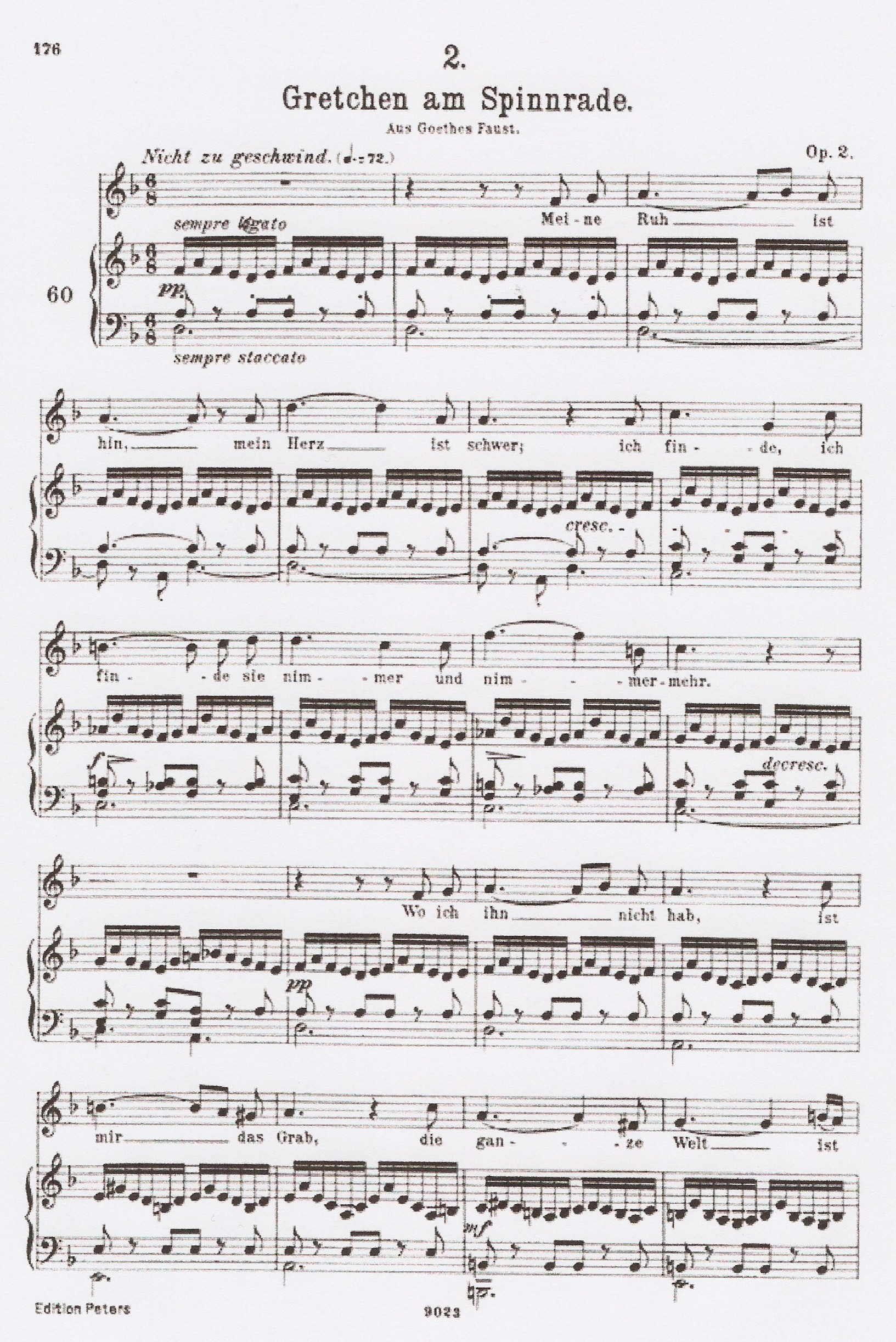
Franz Schubert's early masterpiece Gretchen am Spinnrade, which he wrote at age 17 to verse by Goethe, is one of the earlier of his lieder that is widely performed today.

In the Western classical music tradition, Lied (/liːd, liːt/ LEED, LEET, German: [liːt]; pl. Lieder /ˈliːdər/ LEE-dər, German: [ˈliːdɐ]; lit. 'song') is a term for setting poetry to music. The term is used for any kind of song in German, but among English speakers, lied is often used interchangeably with "art song" to encompass works that the tradition has inspired in other languages as well. The poems that have been made into lieder often center on pastoral themes or themes of romantic love.

The earliest Lieder date from the late fourteenth or early fifteenth centuries, and can even refer to Minnesang from as early as the 12th and 13th centuries. It later came especially to refer to settings of Romantic poetry during the late eighteenth and nineteenth centuries, and into the early twentieth century. Examples include settings by Joseph Haydn, Wolfgang Amadeus Mozart, Ludwig van Beethoven, Franz Schubert, Robert Schumann, Johannes Brahms, Hugo Wolf, Gustav Mahler or Richard Strauss.

== Early history ==
=== Terminology ===
For German speakers, the term "Lied" has a long history ranging from twelfth-century troubadour songs (Minnesang) via folk songs (Volkslieder) and church hymns (Kirchenlieder) to twentieth-century workers' songs (Arbeiterlieder) or protest songs (Kabarettlieder, Protestlieder).

The German word Lied for "song" (cognate with the English dialectal leed) first came into general use in German during the early fifteenth century, largely displacing the earlier word gesang.

=== Late Middle Ages or Early Renaissance ===
The poet and composer Oswald von Wolkenstein is sometimes claimed to be the creator of the lied because of his innovations in combining words and music. The late-fourteenth-century composer known as the Monk of Salzburg wrote six two-part lieder which are older still, but Oswald's songs (about half of which actually borrow their music from other composers) far surpass the Monk of Salzburg in both number (about 120 lieder) and quality.

From the 15th century come three large song collections compiled in Germany: the Lochamer Liederbuch, the Schedelsches Liederbuch, and the Glogauer Liederbuch.

=== Renaissance ===
The scholar Konrad Celtis (1459–1508), the Arch-Humanist of German Renaissance, taught his students to compose Latin poems using the metric patterns following the model of the Horatian odes. These poems were subsequently "set to simple, four-part music, incorporate the shifting accenmal patterns of the French vers mesurée". The composers of this style included Heinrich Finck, Paul Hofhaimer, and Ludwig Senfl. The style also became imbued into the new German humanist dramas, thus contributing to the development of Protestant hymnody. The style is present in the earliest German secular polyphony collections such as Johann Ott's Mehrstimmiges Deutsches Liederbuch (1534) and Georg Forster's Frische teutsche Liedlein (about 1540 onwards). According to Chester Lee Alwes, Heinrich Isaac's popular song Innsbruck, ich muss dich lassen "became the gold standard of the Lied genre".

== The mainstream lied tradition in classical music ==
With the late 18th century, the term "lied" comes to be used with its primary meaning, "art song in the classical music tradition." For information on this tradition in general, see art song.

The musical forces for lieder were standardized as a single singer, accompanied by a piano. The piano had only recently achieved widespread use; and its greater expressive possibilities relative to the earlier harpsichord may have played a role in advancing the composition of lieder. Usually the intended singing voice is a "high voice", in the sense that it is comfortably within the range of a soprano or a tenor. For both, the music as printed is the same; the soprano sings the notes as written, the tenor an octave lower. Lieder were also written for the lower voices: baritone/bass for men, mezzo/alto for women. Lieder are often sung in transposition, either carried out on the spot by a skilled pianist, or through published transposed editions of the music. Transposition is a fully-accepted practice; for instance, the celebrated lieder singer Dietrich Fischer-Dieskau sang a great number of songs transposed downward, to match his baritone voice.

The classical-era masters Haydn, Mozart and Beethoven all wrote lieder that are performed today, though for each of them the lied was something of a minor genre. It is in the songs of Franz Schubert that the genre came into its own. Schubert found a new balance between words and music, a new expression of the sense of the words in and through the music. In his short life (1797-1828) he wrote over 600 songs. Some examples of widely-sung lieder by Schubert are Erlkönig, Der Tod und das Mädchen ("Death and the Maiden"), Gretchen am Spinnrade, and Der Doppelgänger.

Schubert's work proved an inspiration to other composers, and songwriting in the tradition he established was continued through the 19th century, notably by Robert Schumann, Johannes Brahms, and Hugo Wolf. In the 20th century, the tradition was continued, most notably by Gustav Mahler, who often issued his lieder in two versions, one with the traditional piano accompaniment and one for full orchestra. Other 20th century lieder composers include Hans Pfitzner, Max Reger, Richard Strauss, Alexander Zemlinsky. Arnold Schoenberg, Alban Berg, Anton Webern, and Ernst Krenek wrote tonal, atonal, and twelve-tone Lieder.

=== Texts ===
Recordings of lieder typically come with booklets or other material giving the original text, so that non-German-speaking listeners can follow the meaning of the verse as they listen; the same is true of concert programs.

==== Basis in poetry ====
While it is certainly possible for a poet to write new lyrics to existing music, in lieder the overwhelming pattern was for the composer to seek out an existing poem and set it to music. The poetry chosen by the classical composers had a variety of sources. Sometime, the lieder composers were personally acquainted with the poets whose verse they set. Several of Haydn's finest songs are to English-language poetry by his friend Anne Hunter, whom he met during his journeys (1791-1793, 1794-1795) to London. Schubert's active circle of friends included poets (mostly not famous today) who provided poems for him to set. At the same time, the lieder composers also read published poetry, seeking verse to set. For this purpose, it was felicitous that the late 18th and the 19th centuries were a golden age for German versification, in which the most celebrated poets were active. For instance, Goethe, Schiller, and Heine all wrote poems that were set by members of the classical-music pantheon. Yet the most successful lieder did not necessarily come from the greatest poets: Friedrich Rückert is not considered among the very best poets of German literature, yet his poetry proved deeply inspirational to Schubert, Brahms, and Mahler.

Concerning the role of the poem in a Lied, the noted Lieder pianist Graham Johnson has written:

All songs have lyrics, but in many cases the tune comes first. With Lieder the opposite is true: the poet is often more than the composer’s equal and the poem is often a great work of art in its own right, known and loved without music.

The composer’s task is to give this poem a heightened existence through their own vision and imaginative skill. The song’s melody and text are the singer’s responsibility, but it is the addition of a piano accompaniment, subtle and sometimes highly complex, that adds harmony and character to the whole. The greatest Lieder composers conjure an astonishing variety of narratives, moods and atmospheres, a synthesis of word and tone employing almost minimalist means that can take the listener’s breath away.

Performers have to be very word-aware when presenting a poem through this musical prism – a great Lied may be first and foremost an unforgettable piece of music, but the poem that breathes within the structure is its life-force.

==== Strophic vs. through-composed settings ====
Often a poem will be composed of multiple stanzas, often being of equal length and having the same internal structure (line length, meter, rhyme scheme). The composers of lieder have responded to such stanza sequences in two ways. In a strophic setting, the composer writes a song long enough to cover just one stanza, and specifies that it is to be repeated for every stanza. Graphically, a repeat sign is placed at the end of the song, and the verses are (space permitting) aligned in a stack, each syllable of each line falling under its assigned musical note. An example of a strophic song is "Das Wandern," the opening song of Schubert's song cycle (see below) Die schöne Müllerin, with the same music for all five stanzas. In a through-composed song (German "durchkomponiert"), there are no repeat signs, and the composer is free, in principle, to write distinct music for all of the lines of the poem. There are no repeat signs, and the poem is written out one line at a time under music sufficient to encompass all the stanzas.

The difference between strophic and through-composed settings naturally has consequences for expression: the strophic song (widely regarded as the simpler and less sophisticated form) can only express the general feeling of the poem, whereas a through-composed setting can reflect in detail the words of each separate stanza.

The distinction between strophic and through-composed settings is a blurred one, for composers often produce settings in which the music for each stanza is the same at a general, abstract level, but is adapted in detail to the individual stanzas. Thus Beethoven's Abendlied unterm gestirnten Himmel, as described in Cooper (2001), is fundamentally a strophic song, but the music is written out for all four stanzas as Beethoven adjusts the sung music in subtle ways (and the piano part, in less subtle ways) to the content of what is being sung. Further, a through-composed song will almost always repeat some musical material, simply because repetition of thematic material is part of the ordinary language and procedure of music in general.

==== Prose settings ====
On rare occasions lieder composers would write a song not to poetry but to prose. A notable case is Brahms's Four Serious Songs (1896), which sets prose passages from the Lutheran Bible.

=== Song cycles ===
Song cycles (German: Liederzyklus or Liederkreis) are series of Lieder, usually at least half a dozen, tied by a single narrative or theme. The first was Beethoven's An die ferne Geliebte. Schubert's two cycles Die schöne Müllerin and Winterreise are among his most famous works and are performed quite frequently in modern times. Robert Schumann also wrote distinguished song cycles: Frauen-Liebe und Leben and Dichterliebe; Mahler is noted for the bleak but powerful Kindertotenlieder, "Songs on the death of children".

=== Other national traditions ===
The art-song tradition established by Schubert was pursued by composers outside the German-speaking lands, where the genre naturally would be referred to by a different name (other than in Dutch, where the word for song is also "lied"). The mélodies of Hector Berlioz, Gabriel Fauré, Claude Debussy, and Francis Poulenc are French parallels to the German Lied. Modest Mussorgsky's and Sergei Rachmaninoff's Russian songs are also analogous. 20th-century English examples, as represented by Ralph Vaughan Williams, Benjamin Britten, Ivor Gurney, and Gerald Finzi, were often folk-like in idiom.

=== Musical forces ===
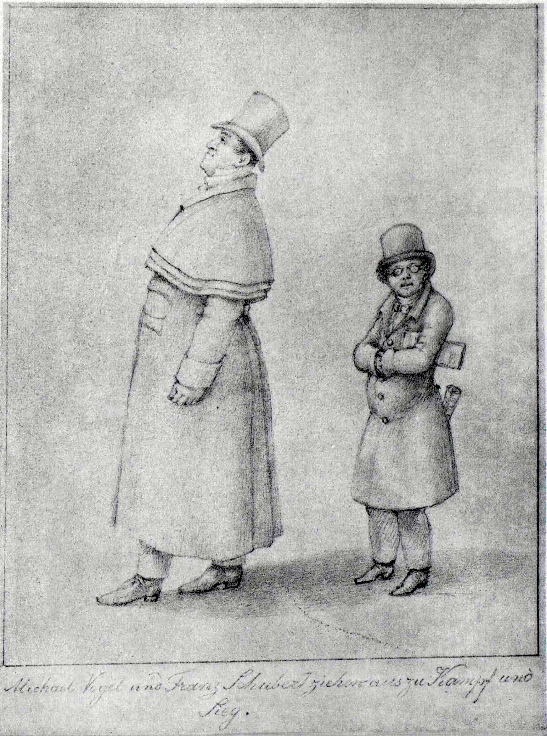
The diminutive Franz Schubert with his tall friend and collaborator Johann Michael Vogl. Caricature drawing by Franz von Schober

A key aspect of most lieder (and other art songs) is a relative equality of the two parts: the pianist is not an "accompanist" to the singer, but tackles a part that usually is equally expressive and musically important. This is in a sense natural, since most of the great composers of lieder (e.g. Beethoven, Schubert, Schumann, Brahms, Mahler) were outstanding pianists but at best indifferent singers. Some lieder composers developed a special relationship with a singer who habitually first sang their songs: Schubert with Johann Michael Vogl and Benjamin Britten with Peter Pears. Leading singers of lieder today often collaborate with pianists who have strong independent reputations, e.g. Peter Schreier with Andras Schiff, or Ian Bostridge with Leif Ove Andsnes. Yet there are also pianists whose reputation has come primarily from being outstanding collaborators with lieder singers, notably Gerald Moore and Graham Johnson, quoted above.

The singers themselves form an artistic population that is at least somewhat separated from the singers of opera (which forms a larger venue for classical singing). Thus, for example, Dietrich Fischer-Dieskau and Elly Ameling became celebrated for their lieder singing, though they also ventured into opera from time to time. In the other direction, singers whose reputation arose in opera will sometimes venture into lieder recitals and recordings. Generally, lieder singing does not require the great volume needed to fill an opera house, but audiences expect great musical sensitivity, including close attention to the meaning of the lyrics.

The pianist Artur Schnabel, who for decades performed lieder with his wife Therese Behr, opined (in lectures from 1945) on the difference in musical culture between opera and lieder:

In public performances Lieder should be presented in intimate halls. Which successful musical performer would relinquish the biggest halls if he can fill them, and obey artistic demands if they involve sacrifices? Opera singers are rarely able to do justice to the Lied. The 'real' Lieder singer is, vice versa, not suitable for opera.

Another potential source for performers of lieder is individual lay musicians, trained in piano or voice, singing in their own homes. Such musicians indeed formed much of the audience for lieder when they were first composed, and created a source of income for the lieder composer. While some lieder are very difficult to perform (the piano part of Schubert's Erlkönig is notorious in this respect), many lieder could be creditably performed by capable amateurs. The domestic performance of lieder declined when recordings and broadcasting led to the replacement of active by passive musical recreation. Artur Schnabel, in the lecture series quoted above, mourned the loss of the domestic lieder-singing tradition, and encouraged his audience (of young music students) to revive it, at least at the individual level.

How can you compensate for the loss of the exaltation experienced by a close association with the unique treasure of the Lied literature? I can see only one way: all who are drawn to it, who play the piano and can read music ... ought to get Schubert's (and other) songs and devote some of their free time every day to communion with them.

== Works cited ==
- Cooper, Barry (2001). "Beethoven's 'Abendlied' and the Wiener Zeitschrift". Music & Letters. 82 (8): 234–250. doi:10.1093/ml/82.2.234.
- Schnabel, Artur (1970) My Life and Music. Gerrards Cross, UK: Colin Smythe. This work transcribes a lecture series given in 1945.
