= Es steht ein Baum im tiefen Tal =

Austrian folk song

"Es steht ein Baum im tiefen Tal" (English: "There stands a tree in a deep valley"), also known as Erprobte Treue (English: "Tested Loyalty") or Die Liebesprobe (English: "The Test of Love"), is an Austrian folk song originating from Burgenland in the form of a ballad. Its composer and lyricist are unknown.

Burgenland within Austria

The song is often regarded as the folk song of Burgenland, owing not only to its popularity within the region but also its melodic similarities to works by Joseph Haydn, who lived in Eisenstadt, the capital of the state.

There are various versions of the song, such as "Es steht eine Lind' im tiefen Thal" (English: "There stands a lime in a deep valley"), which differ from the original.

== Origins ==
The story of the lovers under the lime tree and the girl's loyalty dates back to the 15th century. However, no melody from that early period is known. By the 16th century, it had already appeared in numerous arrangements, including versions by Jacobus Clemens non Papa and Caspar Othmayr. A christian-spiritual version for the Feast of the Annunciation was also created, titled "There is a Lime Tree in the Kingdom of Heaven"

From the 17th century onward, many variants of the song became known. The most extensive version, consisting of 25 stanzas, originated in the village of Gaas around 1860.

After 1945, the song was included in the Burgenland school curriculum and appeared in school songbooks with four verses, which led to an increase in its popularity within the region.

== Content ==
The song tells of a young woman beneath a lime tree in a deep valley who remains loyal to her absent lover, who has to go to war for seven years. After the seven years have passed, a soldier rides by and sees her mourning, upon which he asks what had happened. She replies that her beloved has been away for seven years. The soldier then tells her that her sweetheart is in the town and has married another woman, upon which she breaks down in tears. He then pulls out a handkerchief and reveals that he is in fact her lover, explaining that he had only been testing her loyalty, and finally asks her to marry him as he embraces her.

== Music ==
The melody shows similarities to the aria "In native worth and honour clad" from The Creation by Joseph Haydn, who lived in the Burgenland capital of Eisenstadt for 39 years. However, there is no evidence to suggest that Haydn actually knew the melody and adopted it.

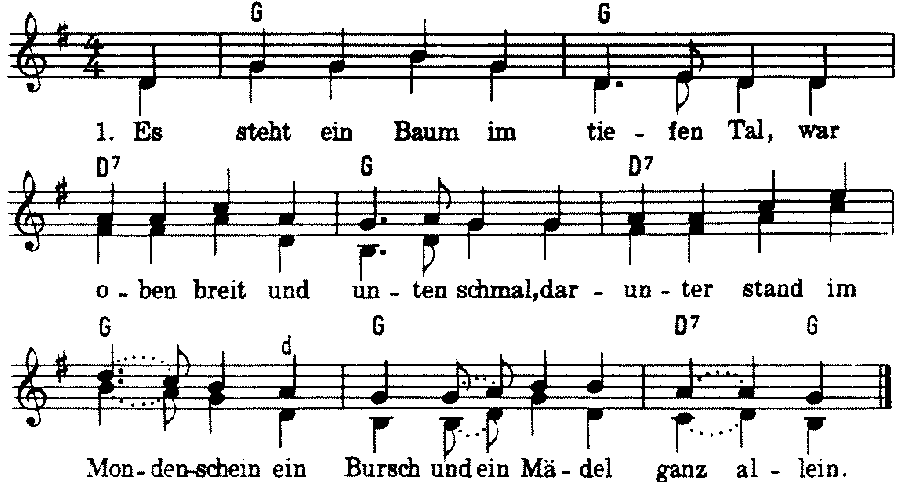
Instrumental version:

== Lyrics ==
Es steht ein Baum im tiefen Tal,
war oben breit und unten schmal,
darunter stand im Mondenschein
ein Bursch und ein Mädel ganz allein.

"Ei, pfiat di Gott, mei liaber Schatz,
weil ich auf sieben Jahr muß fort."
"Und mußt du sieben Jahre wandern,
ich heirat keinen andern."

Als sieben Jahr' verflossen sein,
im Garten ging das Mäd'l allein.
Da kam mit stolzen Schritten
ein Soldat wohl hergeritten.

"O, du schwarzbraunes Mädl mein,
was machst du hier so ganz allein?
Ist dir dein Vater und Mutter krank,
oder hast du heimlich einen Mann?"

"Mir ist mein Vater
und Mutter nicht krank,
ich hab auch heimlich keinen Mann.
Heut sinds drei Wochen
und sieben Jahr,
daß mein Schatz gewandert war."

"Gestern war ich in der Stadt,
wo dein Herzliebster Hochzeit hatt'."
Und wie sie hatt'
dies Wort vernommen,
da ist ihr gleich das Weinen kommen.

Er zog ein Tuch aus seinem Sack,
worinnen ja ihr Name lag:
"Ich hab dich nur so viel probiert,
was du zur Botschaft sagen wirst."

"Tritt her, tritt her,
in meine Arm',
wir treten hin zum Traualtar
und wölln so lang beisammen bleibn,
bis daß uns der liebe Gott
wird scheid'n!"

Was wünschen wir zu diesen Ehr'n?
So viel der Himmel
zu Nacht hat Stern'.
Wir wünschen ihnen Glück und Seg'n
und allezeit ein fröhlich's Leb'n!

There stands a tree in a deep valley,
was above broad and under small,
beneath stand in moonlight
a lad and a girl quite alone.

"Aye, decree of God, my beloved,
as I of seven years must be away."
"And must you seven years wander,
I marry no other."

When seven years expired be,
in the garden went the maiden alone.
There came with prancing steps
a soldier well-riding.

"O, you tawny maiden mine
what makes you here so quite alone?
Are your father and mother ill,
or have you secretly a man?"

"My father
and mother are not ill,
I have also secretly no man.
Today is three weeks
and seven year
that my sweetheart was gone."

"Yesterday was I in the city,
where your darling a wedding had."
And when she had
this word heard,
then to her instantly weeping comes.

He pulled a cloth from his bag,
wherein, indeed, her name lay:
"I have thee only so much tested,
what you to this message will say."

"Come here, come here,
into my arms,
we go to the marriage altar
and will so long together remain,
until that us dear God
will separate!"

What wishes we to these honored?
So much the sky
of night has stars,
we wish for them luck and blessings
and always a happy life!
