= Jesus Christus, unser Heiland, der von uns den Gotteszorn wandt =

Lutheran hymn composed by Martin Luther

- Hymn by Martin Luther
- English: Jesus Christ, our Savior, who turned God's wrath from us
- Catalogue: Zahn 1576
- Occasion: Communion
- Text: by Martin Luther
- Language: German
- Based on: "Jesus Christus, nostra salus", then attributed to Jan Hus
- Published: 1524
- Organ recording of the hymn

"Jesus Christus, unser Heiland, der von uns den Gotteszorn wandt" (Jesus Christ, our Savior, who turned God's wrath away from us) is a Lutheran hymn in ten stanzas by Martin Luther for communion, first published in 1524 in the Erfurt Enchiridion. It is one of Luther's hymns which he wrote to strengthen his concepts of reformation. The models for the text and the melody of Luther's hymn existed in early 15th-century Bohemia. The text of the earlier hymn, "Jesus Christus nostra salus", goes back to the late 14th century. That hymn was embedded in a Hussite tradition.

== History ==
The model for "Jesus Christus, unser Heiland, der von uns den Gotteszorn wandt" is a late 14th-century hymn relating to the Eucharist by Jan of Jenštejn, archbishop of Prague. The 14th-century hymn, in content comparable to the 13th century Lauda Sion Salvatorem, exists in two versions with ten stanzas: the first eight verses of the Latin version ("Jesus Christus, nostra salus", Jesus Christ, our salvation) form an acrostic on JOHANNES, while another version, in Czech, was also spread by the Hussite Unity of the Brethren.

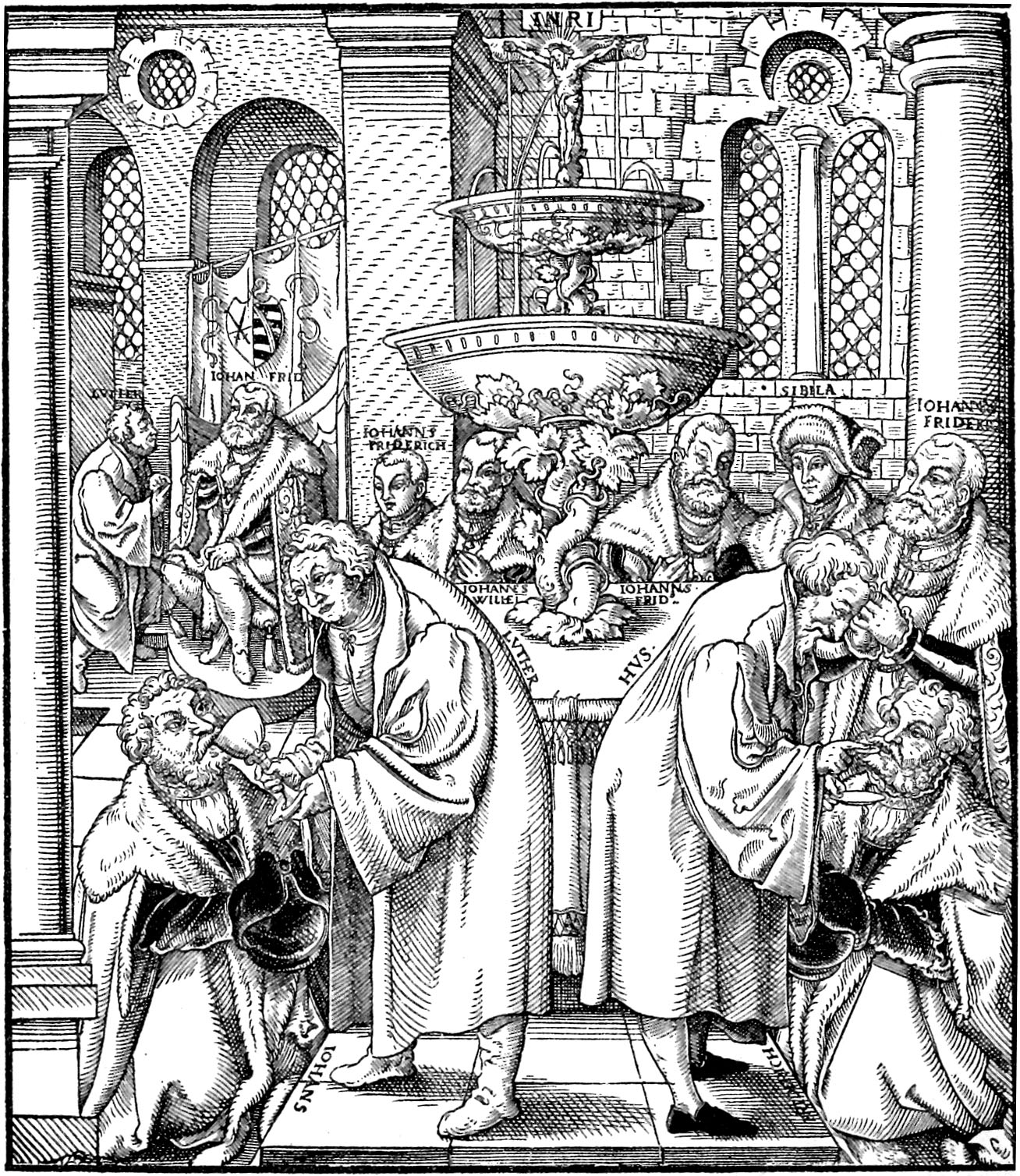
Allegoric representation of Sacramental union, the Lutheran doctrine of Real presence of Christ in the Eucharist, after a woodcut by Lucas Cranach the Elder (ca. 1550). In the front Communion under both kinds is pictured with (on the left) Luther giving the chalice with Eucharistic wine to John, Elector of Saxony and on the right Hus giving the Eucharistic bread to Frederick III, Elector of Saxony (Frederick the Wise). In the back a Fountain of Living Water: The blood of Christ's Five Holy Wounds spills in a fountain on the altar.

Luther wrote hymns to have the congregation actively participate in church services and to strengthen his theological concepts. In Lent of 1524 Luther was explaining his views on Eucharist in a series of sermons. "Jesus Christus, unser Heiland, der von uns den Gotteszorn wandt", probably written around the same time, contained many ideas he had been developing in these sermons, taking the older Eucharistic hymn as a model: he kept the meter, the number of stanzas and the first line of "Jesus Christus nostra salus", but shaped the content to reflect his own theology.

In Luther's time "Jesus Christus nostra salus" was attributed to the church reformer Jan Hus (a "Johannes" like Jenštejn). Luther saw Hus as a precursor and martyr. Early prints of "Jesus Christus, unser Heiland, der von uns den Gotteszorn wandt" came under the header "Das Lied S. Johannes Hus gebessert" (The song of St. Johannes Hus improved). Luther presented the hymn with several variants of the melody that had been associated with "Jesus Christus nostra salus" for over a century.

The earliest extant copy of "Jesus Christus nostra salus" (text and melody) is found in southern Bohemia, 1410. The earliest extant prints of Luther's hymn (both editions of the Erfurt Enchiridion and Johann Walter's choral hymnal Eyn geystlich Gesangk Buchleyn) originated in 1524. Later versions approved by Luther (since he wrote the foreword to these editions) are contained in the Klug'sche Gesangbuch (1529/1533) and the Babstsches Gesangbuch (1545).

== Text ==
While "Jesus Christus nostra salus" is focused on the presence of Christ in both bread and wine, Luther added that the Eucharist means the "surety of God's grace in forgiveness". He deals with the Passion (in stanzas 1–2, 4,6), with the faith necessary to properly receive (3, 5), the invitation, based on scripture (7, 8), and the love of Christ (9, 10) as the "fruit of faith, to be extended to others".

The 1524 Erfurt Enchiridion presented the melody and the ten stanzas of Luther's hymn on two pages:

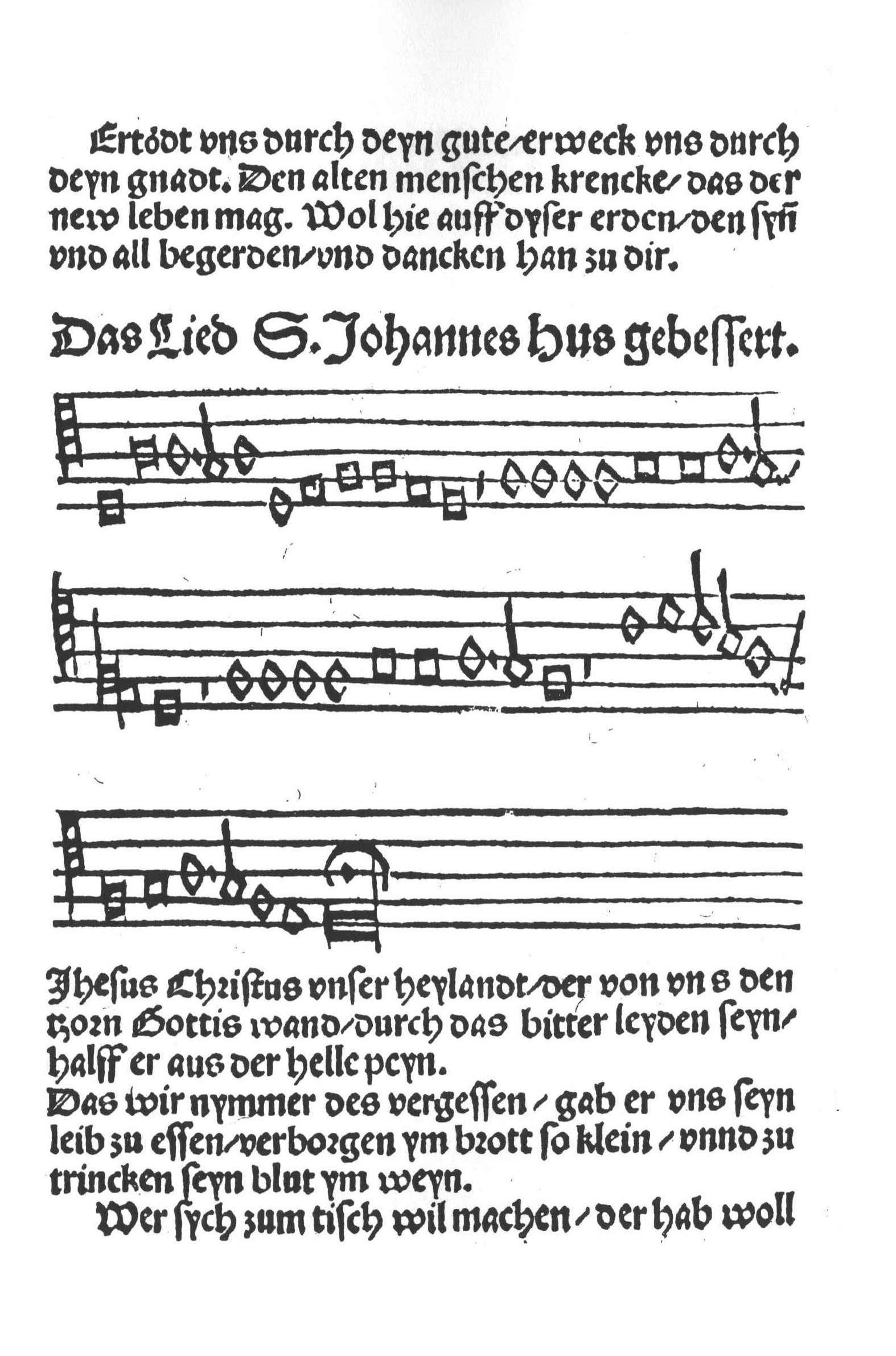
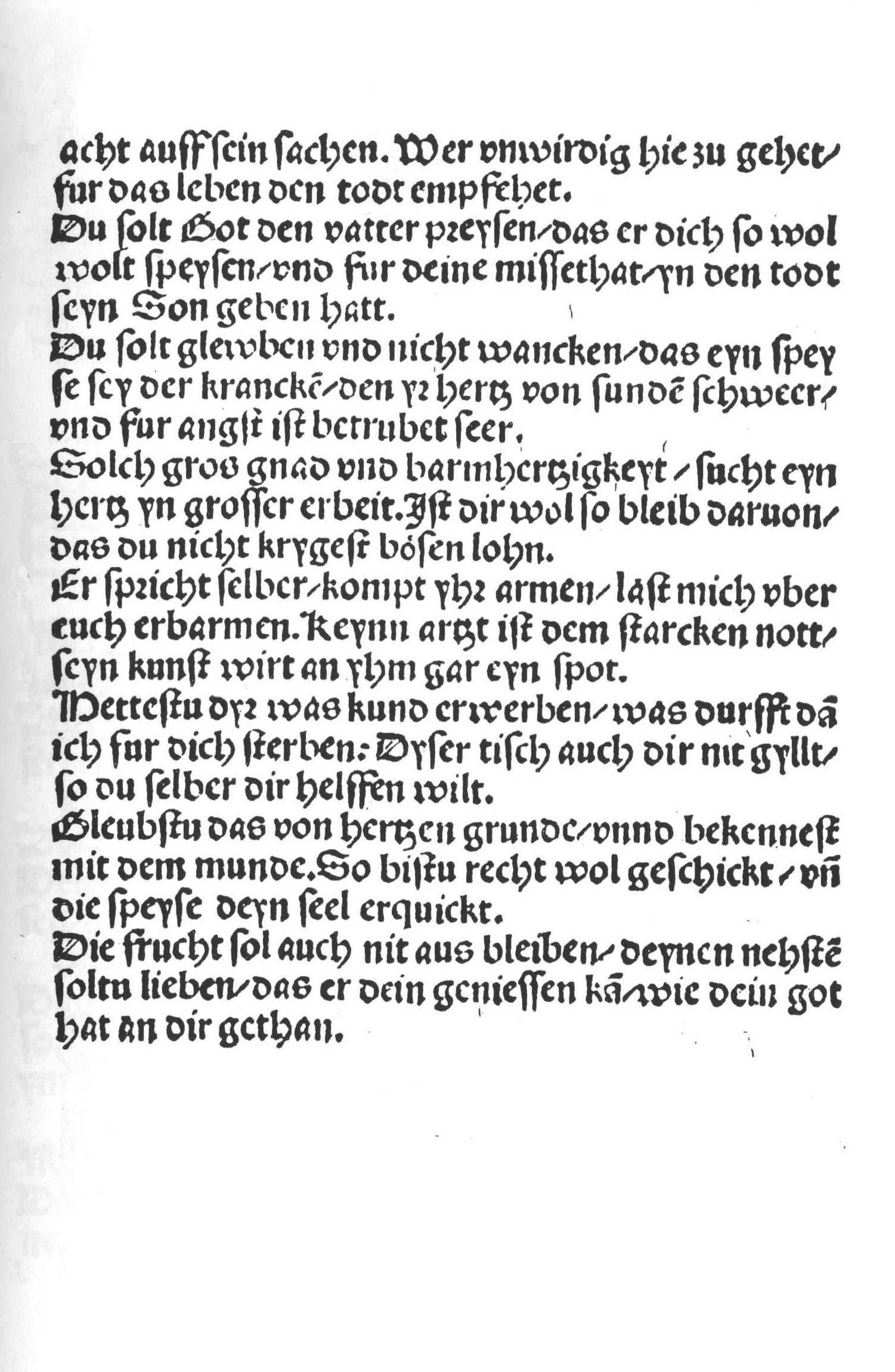

Below is the full text of Luther's hymn with the English translation by Charles Sanford Terry:

Jesus Christus, unser Heiland,
der von uns den Gottes Zorn wandt,
durch das bitter Leiden sein
half er uns aus der Höllen Pein.

Daß wir nimmer des vergessen,
Gab er uns sein Leib zu essen,
Verborgen im Brot so klein,
Und zu trinken sein Blut im Wein.

Wer sich will zu dem Tische machen,
Der hab wohl acht auf sein Sachen;
Wer unwürdig hiezu geht,
Für das Leben den Tod empfäht.

Du sollst Gott den Vater preisen,
Daß er dich so wohl wollt speisen,
Und für deine Missetat
In den Tod sein Sohn geben hat.

Du sollst glauben und nicht wanken,
Daß ein Speise sei den Kranken,
Den ihr Herz von Sünden schwer,
Und vor Angst betrübet, sehr.

Solch groß Gnad und Barmherzigkeit
Sucht ein Herz in großer Arbeit;
Ist dir wohl, so bleib davon,
Daß du nicht kriegest bösen Lohn.

Er spricht selber:Kommt, ihr Armen,
Laßt mich über euch erbarmen;
Kein Arzt ist dem Starken not,
Sein Kunst wird an ihm gar ein Spott.

Hättst dir war kunnt erwerben,
Was durft denn ich für dich sterben?
Dieser Tisch auch dir nicht gilt,
So du selber dir helfen willst.

Glaubst du das von Herzensgrunde
Und bekennest mit dem Mund,
So bist du recht wohl geschickt
Und die Speise dein Seel erquickt.

Die Frucht soll auch nicht ausbleiben:
Deinen Nächsten sollst du lieben,
Daß er dein genießen kann,
Wie dein Gott an dir getan.

Translation:

Christ Jesus, our Redeemer born,
Who from us did God's anger turn,
Through His sufferings sore and main,
Did help us all out of hell-pain.

That we never should forget it,
Gave He us His flesh, to eat it,
Hid in poor bread, gift divine,
And, to drink, His blood in the wine.

Who will draw near to that table
Must take heed, all he is able.
Who unworthy thither goes,
Thence death instead of life he knows.

God the Father praise thou duly,
That He thee would feed so truly,
And for ill deeds by thee done
Up unto death has given His Son.

Have this faith, and do not waver,
'Tis a food for every craver
Who, his heart with sin opprest,
Can no more for its anguish rest.

Such kindness and such grace to get,
Seeks a heart with agony great.
Is it well with thee? take care,
Lest at last thou shouldst evil fare.

He doth say, Come hither, O ye
Poor, that I may pity show ye.
No physician th' whole man will,
He makes a mockery of his skill.

Hadst thou any claim to proffer,
Why for thee then should I suffer?
This table is not for thee,
If thou wilt set thine own self free.

If such faith thy heart possesses,
And the same thy mouth confesses,
Fit guest then thou art indeed,
And so the food thy soul will feed.

But bear fruit, or lose thy labour:
Take thou heed thou love thy neighbour;
That thou food to him mayst be,
As thy God makes Himself to thee.

== Melody ==
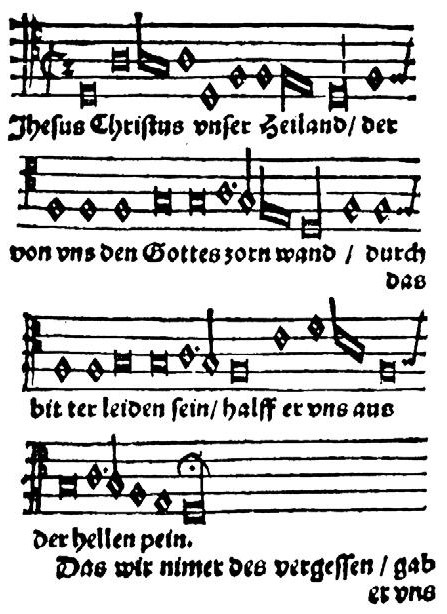
2 variant of "Jesus Christus, unser Heiland, der von uns den Gotteszorn wandt", as published in the second quarter of the 16th century in Wittenberg

For their hymns, Luther and the circle around him chose either to compose a new melody, or to borrow an older melody from Latin religious chant, or to adopt a melody from folk-song tradition. "Jesus Christus unser Heiland, der von uns," Zahn No. 1576, falls in the second of these categories. Characteristically for such melodies it did not fit easily in the then prevailing mensural notation system, leading to several rhythmic variants in the successive publications of the melody.

Also for the pitch of the notes there are some variants. What all publications share is two opening notes with the same duration, the second a fifth higher than the first. Fifth and sixth note usually have half the time value of the opening notes (except when using no long non-melismatic notes like in Scheidt's 1650 versions). In Luther's time the earliest variants would have been sung at a quicker pace than the later variants: in Walter's 1524 publication ( tempo in mensural notation) the seventh and eighth note have the same duration as the first two notes, with the seventh note a major second above the first, while in the later Klug'sche and the Babstsches hymnals the tempo has slowed to 2, with the seventh and eighth note, both a minor third above the opening note, having half the time value of the opening notes. In modern notation Die Lieder Martin Luthers (kirche-bremen.de) p. 25 follows the first editions, while Wackernagel 1848 p. 12 follows the later variant.

Some modern presentations of the melody go further back to the 1410 nostra salus version, e.g. the version of the Luther Gesellschaft, or wander from the original melodic line of the tenor, e.g. the 1993 version of Christian Worship: a Lutheran hymnal. Fitting the hymn's melody in a time signature according to modern music notation with bar lines leads to additional variants. To name only a few: Scheidt 1650 has eleven measures in , with a whole measure for the first two notes; BWV 363 has twelve measures in 4/4, with the first two notes taking half a measure; Bacon 1883 (p. 30) has fifteen measures in time, with in the third and fourth measure; Distler 1938 (p. 17) has the same number of measures, in ^{2} time, with in the third and fourth measure.

== Musical settings ==
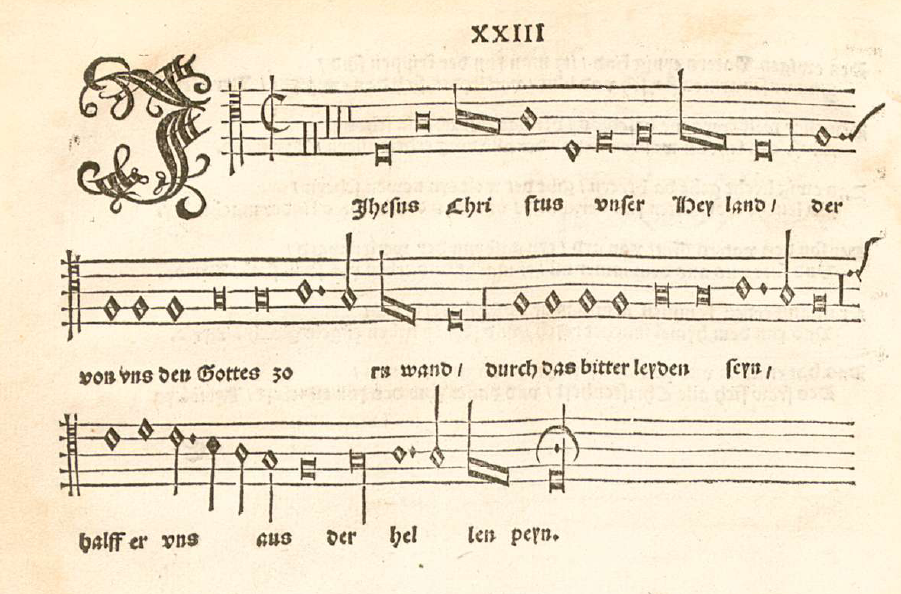
Part from Walter's Eyn geystlich Gesangk Buchleyn (1524)

In 1524 Johann Walter's choral setting of the hymn appeared in Eyn geystlich Gesangk Buchleyn. Around a decade later Luther's hymn was included in the Klug'sche Gesangbuch. Michael Vehe, publisher of an early Catholic hymnal, Ein new Gesangbüchlin geystlicher Lieder (Leipzig 1537), provided a version in 22 stanzas intended for the feast of Corpus Christi. That version has strong Counter-Reformation overtones. Georg Rhau published Balthasar Resinarius' four-part setting of Luther's hymn in Newe deudsche geistliche Gesenge für die gemeinen Schulen (1544). Also the Babstsches Gesangbuch (1545) contained Luther's version. Johann Leisentrit included a version in eight stanzas (derived from Vehe's version but less militant) as a communion hymn in Geistliche Lieder und Psalmen (1567).

In the 1568 edition of the Gude and Godlie Ballates the hymn was translated as "Our Saviour Christ, King of grace". Choral settings of the German original came from Joachim Decker (choral setting in Melodeyen Gesangbuch, 1604), Michael Praetorius (SATB-SATB setting in Musae Sioniae, Part III, 1607), Hans Leo Hassler (ATBB setting in Psalmen und Christliche Gesäng, 1607), Melchior Vulpius (four-part setting, 1609) and Johannes Eccard (SATTB setting). For organ, there are two four-part settings in Samuel Scheidt's 1650 Görlitzer Tabulaturbuch (SSWV 441–540), and chorale preludes by Franz Tunder (Jesus Christus under Heiland, der von uns den Gotteszorn wand), Johann Christoph Bach (No. 38 in 44 Choräle zum Präambulieren), Johann Pachelbel (No. 7 in Erster Theil etlicher Choräle, c. 1693) and Friedrich Wilhelm Zachow (LV 7, LV 19). Johann Sebastian Bach composed a four-part setting (BWV 363) and four chorale preludes, two as part of his Great Eighteen Chorale Preludes, BWV 665 and 666, and two more as part of his Clavier-Übung III, BWV 688 and 689.

The Moravian Hymn Book includes translations under "Our Saviour Christ by His own death" (1754) and "To avert from men God's wrath" (translation by Christian Ignatius Latrobe first published in 1789 – a century and several editions later the first stanza of this translation was omitted from this publication). The German original is included in 19th-century publications such as Philipp Wackernagel's Martin Luthers geistliche Lieder (1848) and Wilhelm Schircks' edition of Luther's Geistliche Lieder (1854), although adoption in hymnals was declining. New English translations were published in the 19th century: "Jesus Christ, our Saviour" (1846), "Christ our Lord and Saviour" (1847), "Lord Jesus Christ! to Thee we pray, From us" (1849, 1880), "Jesus the Christ—the Lamb of God" (1853), "Christ who freed our souls from danger" (1854, 1884), and "Christ Jesus, our Redeemer born" (1867, 1876).

In the 20th century Hugo Distler wrote a SAB setting. He also published a Partita (organ) and setting (voice and organ), Op. 8/3 No. 3 in 1938. In 1964, Kurt Fiebig produced a setting for three parts: soprano, alto and men. No. 313 of Christian Worship: a Lutheran hymnal (1993) is a four-part setting derived from the Klug'sche Gesangbuch, with a translation of eight stanzas of the hymn as "Jesus Christ, Our Blessed Savior". The Protestant hymnal Evangelisches Gesangbuch includes the hymn as No. 215, omitting verses three and six of the original. A 2012 performance of the hymn in Bremen reverted to the melody version of the very first publication of 1524. A new harmonization for four-part chorus and organ by Yves Kéler and Danielle Guerrier Koegler was published in 2013, on a French translation of the hymn.

== See also ==
- List of hymns by Martin Luther
