= Rhaw =

Rhaw or RHAW may refer to:

- Georg Rhaw (1488–1548), German composer
- Radar Homing and Warning (RHAW), an object-detection system
