= Lorenz Lemlin =

German composer (ca. 1495 – ca. 1549)

Lorenz Lemlin (also: Laurentius Lemlin; ca. 1495 – ca. 1549) was a German composer of the Renaissance.

Lemlin studied in Heidelberg, and was a singer and later Kapellmeister of the Hofkantorei there. Among his pupils was Georg Forster, who published many of Lemlin's lieder in his collection Frische teutsche Liedlein, as well as Jobst von Brandt, Caspar Othmayr, and Stefan Zirler. Another of Lemlin's works is: Der Gutzgauch auf dem Zaune saß.
