= Unser liebe Fraue vom kalten Brunnen =

1556 Landsknecht song by Johann Stahel

- Fictional Landsknecht song by Johann Stahel
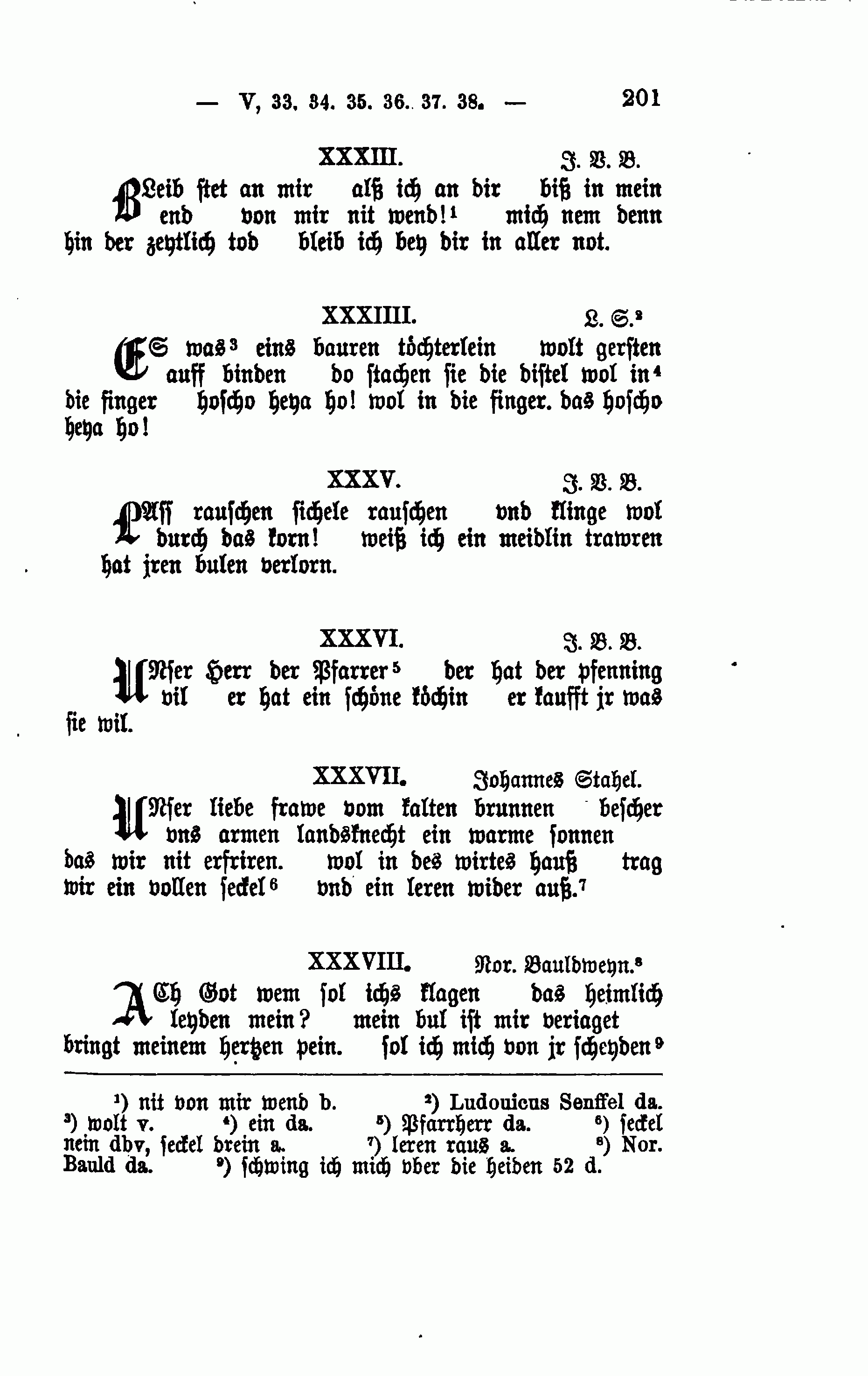
- Unser liebe Fraue vom kalten Brunnen in a 1903 reprint of Frische teutsche Liedlein
- English: Our Dear Virgin from the Cold Well
- Language: German
- Published: 1556

Unser liebe Fraue vom kalten Brunnen (Note: Sometimes "Bronnen", a poetic form of "Brunnen") ("Our Dear Virgin from the Cold Well") is a Landsknecht song that was first published in 1556, in the last volume of Frische teutsche Liedlein, a five volume collection of songs written and published by Georg Forster. It was first published without a corresponding melody. The German composer Johann Stahel later composed a melody for the song. "Our Dear Virgin" is a reference to the Virgin Mary.

== Lyrics ==
Original lyrics, as published in the 16th century, along with their ad hoc English translation:

Unser liebe frawe vom kalten brunnen
bescher uns armen landsknecht ein warme sonnen
das wir nit erfriren.
wol in des wirtes hauß
trag wir ein vollen seckel
und ein leren wider auß.

Our Dear Virgin from the Cold Well
grant us poor mercenaries a warm sun
that we may not freeze.
Into the innkeeper's house we carry a full purse
and an empty one back outside.
