= Heinrich Wilhelm Ernst =

Moravian-Jewish violinist, violist and composer (1812–1865)

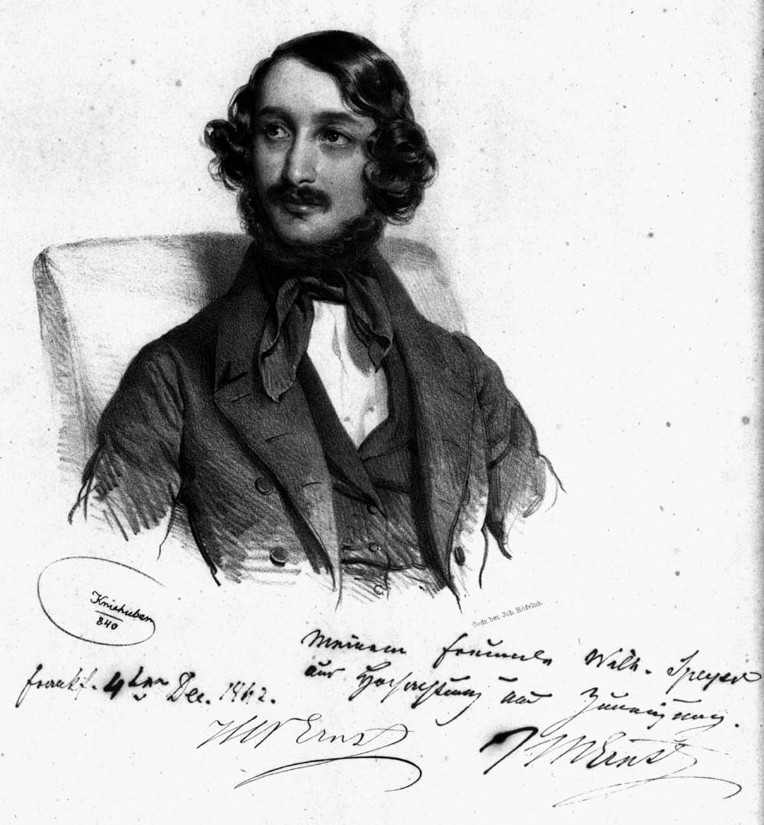
- Lithograph by Josef Kriehuber, 1840

Background information
- Born: Heinrich Wilhelm Ernst; 8 June 1812
- Origin: Brno, Moravia
- Died: 8 October 1865 (aged 53) Nice
- Genres: Classical
- Occupation: Musician
- Instruments: Violin; viola; piano

Heinrich Wilhelm Ernst (8 June 1812 – 8 October 1865) was a Moravian-Jewish violinist, violist and composer. He was seen as the outstanding violinist of his time and one of Niccolò Paganini's greatest successors. He contributed to polyphonic playing and discovered new ways to compose polyphonic violin music. His most famous, and technically difficult, compositions include the sixth of his Polyphonic Studies "Die letzte Rose", and Grand Caprice on Schubert's "Erlkönig".

== Biography ==
Ernst was born in Brno, Moravia on 8 June 1812. (Note: Most articles concerning Heinrich Wilhelm Ernst say he was born on 6 May 1814. Mark W. Rowe, in his 2008 work, concluded that this date could not be correct. The pressure, as a prodigy, to be young, coupled with the absence of a birth certificate and unreliability of the marriage certificate, makes Rowe think that Ernst was actually born on 8 June 1812, and was therefore nearly two years older than is normally thought.) He began playing violin at the age of 9, and attended the Vienna Conservatory of the Gesellschaft der Musikfreunde from 1825, studying violin under Joseph Böhm and Joseph Mayseder, and composition under Ignaz von Seyfried.

In 1828, Niccolò Paganini visited Vienna. Ernst heard him and was deeply impressed by his violin playing. It is said that Ernst then played for Paganini who predicted a brilliant career for him. Paganini gave 14 concerts in Vienna, and Ernst attended many of these to observe the master. In April 1829, Ernst left Vienna for Munich for an employment in the royal orchestra, but Paganini advised him to aim for something higher. After that, Ernst played concerts in the same cities as Paganini. These concerts were appreciated, but he still stood in Paganini's shadow. This depressed him to the degree that he locked himself into his room for five days. Later in Frankfurt in the spring of 1830, Ernst met Paganini again. There, Ernst gave a concert where he played Paganini's Nel cor pìù non mi sento with an accuracy that stunned both the audience and Paganini himself. This work, as with most of Paganini's compositions, was unpublished at that time, which meant that Ernst must have learned it by ear at Paganini's concerts. Some days after, Ernst visited Paganini, who was sitting composing on his guitar. Paganini immediately rose up, threw the manuscript under the bed sheet, and said that he had to protect his composition not only from Ernst's ears, but also his eyes.

In the following years, Ernst made several tours through France. When he heard that Paganini was to play concerts in Marseille in January 1837, he went there to hear his master again. Ernst was determined to learn the secrets of Paganini's complex technique. With help from relatives of his secretary, he rented a room next to Paganini's. He hid there day and night, listening to Paganini rehearse and writing down what he heard. That must have been difficult, because Paganini did not practice much during his tours, and when he did, he used a mute. Ernst also managed, secretly, to attend all of Paganini's rehearsals in Marseille in pursuit of his goal. He too played concerts in Marseille and managed to get these and the concerts Paganini played to become some sort of competition between the two. He tried to organize two concerts before Paganini arrived, and these concerts were well appreciated by the audience. Then, when Paganini was about to play his first concert, the demands on him were greater because of the comparison to Ernst's playing. Paganini couldn't meet the demands of the audience who thought that Ernst's playing had spoken more to the heart. Paganini then organized another concert and challenged the audience by playing his Moïses, variations on the G string, moving some to tears. After that concert, opinions were divided. Some said Paganini mastered the difficulties better, but Ernst played with more sentiment. Ernst learned this composition through the wall from his room next to Paganini.

Perhaps out of respect for Paganini, Ernst later composed his own set of variations on the theme Carnaval de Venise, which he often played at the end of his concert. He also used scordatura in the same manner as Paganini's variations. This piece was popular among Ernst's audiences, and became his signature.

Ernst also played the viola. He performed the viola solo of Berlioz's Harold en Italie many times, including under the direction of the composer in 1842.

Ernst moved to England in 1844, where joined London's Beethoven Quartet Society and played Beethoven String quartets with Joseph Joachim, Henryk Wieniawski and Carlo Alfredo Piatti. He spent the last seven years of his life in Nice, composing works including Polyphonic Studies, Othello-Fantasie and Concerto pathétique.

Severe neuralgia in 1862 left Ernst unable to play. He died in Nice on 8 October 1865.

== Compositions ==
Op.	Title	Scoring	
10	Elégie (sur la mort d'un objet chéri)	violin, orchestra	Vienna, 1840 (also violin, piano)
11	Fantaisie brillante … sur Otello de Rossini	violin, orchestra	Mainz, 1839
12	Concertino in D major	violin, orchestra	Brunswick, 1839
13	Adagio sentimental, Rondino	violin, orchestra	Brunswick, 1841
16	Boléro	violin, orchestra	Hamburg, 1843
17	Polonaise in D major	violin, orchestra	Hamburg, 1842
18	Variations sur l'air national hollandais	violin, orchestra	Vienna, c. 1842
18	Le carnaval de Venise (Variations burlesques sur la canzonetta "Cara mia mamma")	violin, orchestra	Leipzig, 1844
19	Introduction, caprice et finale sur … Il pirata de Bellini	violin, orchestra	London, 1845
21	Rondo Papageno	violin, orchestra	London, 1846
22	Airs hongrois variés	violin, orchestra	London, c. 1850
23	Concerto pathétique in F♯ minor	violin, orchestra	Leipzig, 1851
26	Grand Caprice on Schubert's "Erlkönig"	solo violin	Hamburg, 1854
	Pensées fugitives (Les gages d'amitié)	violin, piano	London, 1843 (collab. S. Heller)
	Feuillet d'album	violin, piano	London, 1844
	Variations on 'I tuoi frequenti palpiti'	violin, piano	London, no date (collab. G. Osborne)
	6 Polyphonic Studies	solo violin	Hamburg, 1865

== Sources ==
- Fan Elun (1993). The Life and Works of Heinrich Wilhelm Ernst (1814–1865) with emphasis on his reception as violinist and composer. Cornell University.
- Heller, Amely (1986). H. W. Ernst – As Seen By His Contemporaries. Linthicum Heights, Maryland.
- Rowe, Mark W. (2008). Heinrich Wilhelm Ernst: Virtuoso Violinist. Ashgate Publishing. ISBN 075466340X.
