= Erlkönig (Schubert) =

Lied by Franz Schubert set to Goethe's poem

- Lied by Franz Schubert
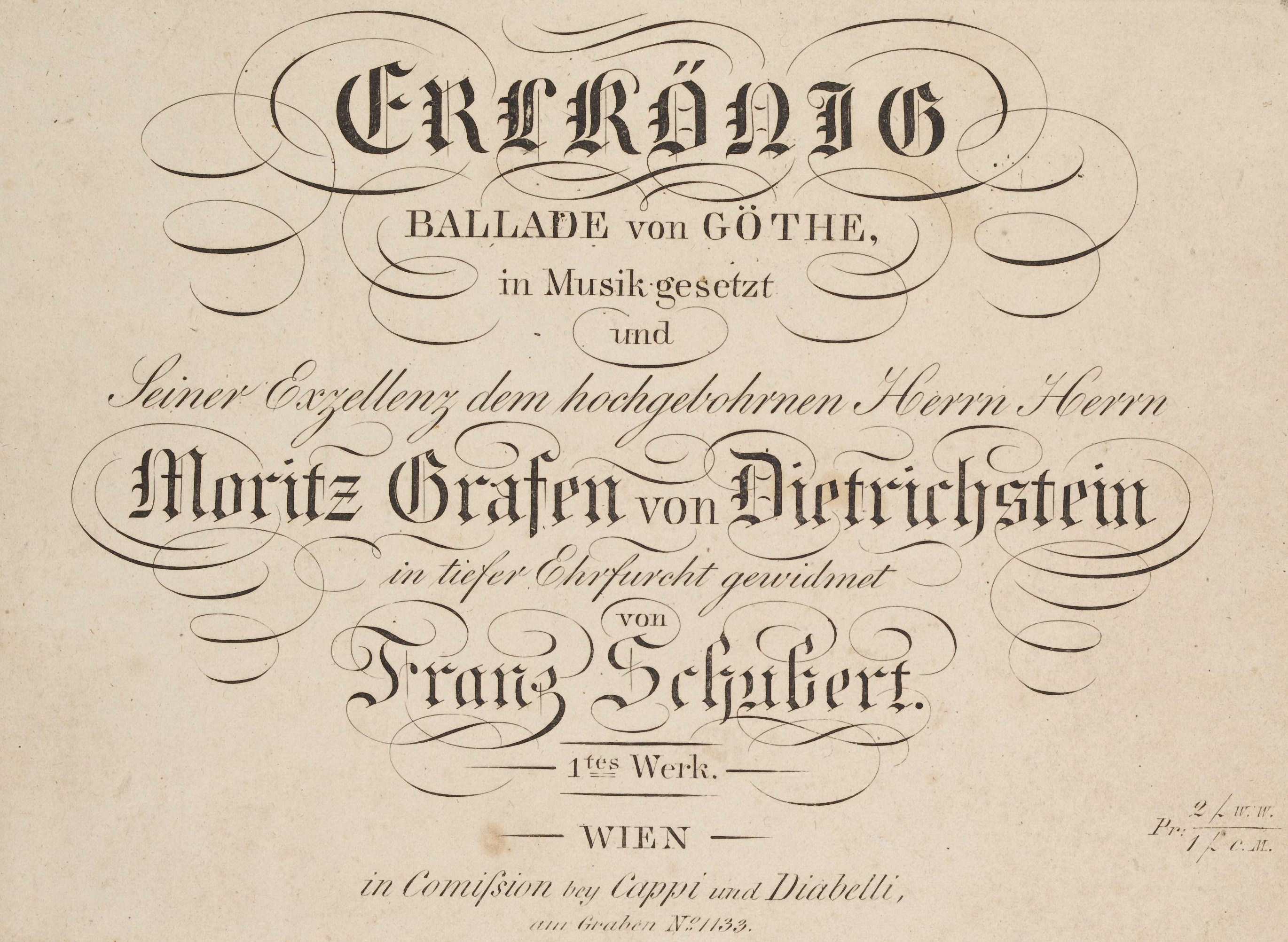
- Title page of the first edition as published by Diabelli in 1821
- Key: G minor
- Catalogue: D. 328
- Opus: 1
- Text: "Erlkönig" (Goethe)
- Language: German
- Composed: 1815
- Scoring: voice; piano

Premiere
- Date: 7 March 1821
- Location: Theater am Kärntnertor, Vienna
- Performers: Johann Michael Vogl, baritone; Anselm Hüttenbrenner, piano

"Erlkönig", Op. 1, D 328, is a Lied composed by Franz Schubert in 1815, which sets Johann Wolfgang von Goethe's poem of the same name. The singer takes the role of four characters — the narrator, a father, his small son, and the titular "Erlking", a supernatural creature who pursues the boy — each of whom exhibit different tessitura, harmonic and rhythmic characteristics. A technically challenging piece for both performers and accompanists, "Erlkönig" has been popular and acclaimed since its premiere in 1821, and has been described as one of the "commanding compositions of the century".

Among Schubert's most famous works, the piece has been arranged by various composers, such as Franz Liszt (solo piano) and Heinrich Wilhelm Ernst (solo violin); Hector Berlioz, Franz Liszt, and Max Reger have orchestrated the piece.

== History ==
Goethe's poem was set in music by at least a hundred composers, including Johann Friedrich Reichardt, Carl Friedrich Zelter and Carl Loewe, though no work would become as preeminent as Schubert's, which stands among the most performed, reworked and recorded compositions ever written.

Schubert composed "Erlkönig" at the age of 18 in 1815 – Joseph von Spaun claims that it was written in a few hours one afternoon. He revised the song three times before publishing his fourth version in 1821 as his Opus 1. The work was first performed in concert on 1 December 1820 at a private gathering in Vienna. The public premiere on 7 March 1821, at the Theater am Kärntnertor, featured Johann Michael Vogl as the solo baritone, accompanied by Anselm Hüttenbrenner on the piano; it was a great success, and quickly propelled the young composer to fame in Vienna.

=== Publication history ===
"Erlkönig" exists in four versions by Schubert's hand, with the 3rd version featuring a simplified piano accompaniment without triplets in the right hand. The original (for medium voice) is in the key of G minor, though there are also transposed editions for high and low voice.

== Structure and musical analysis ==
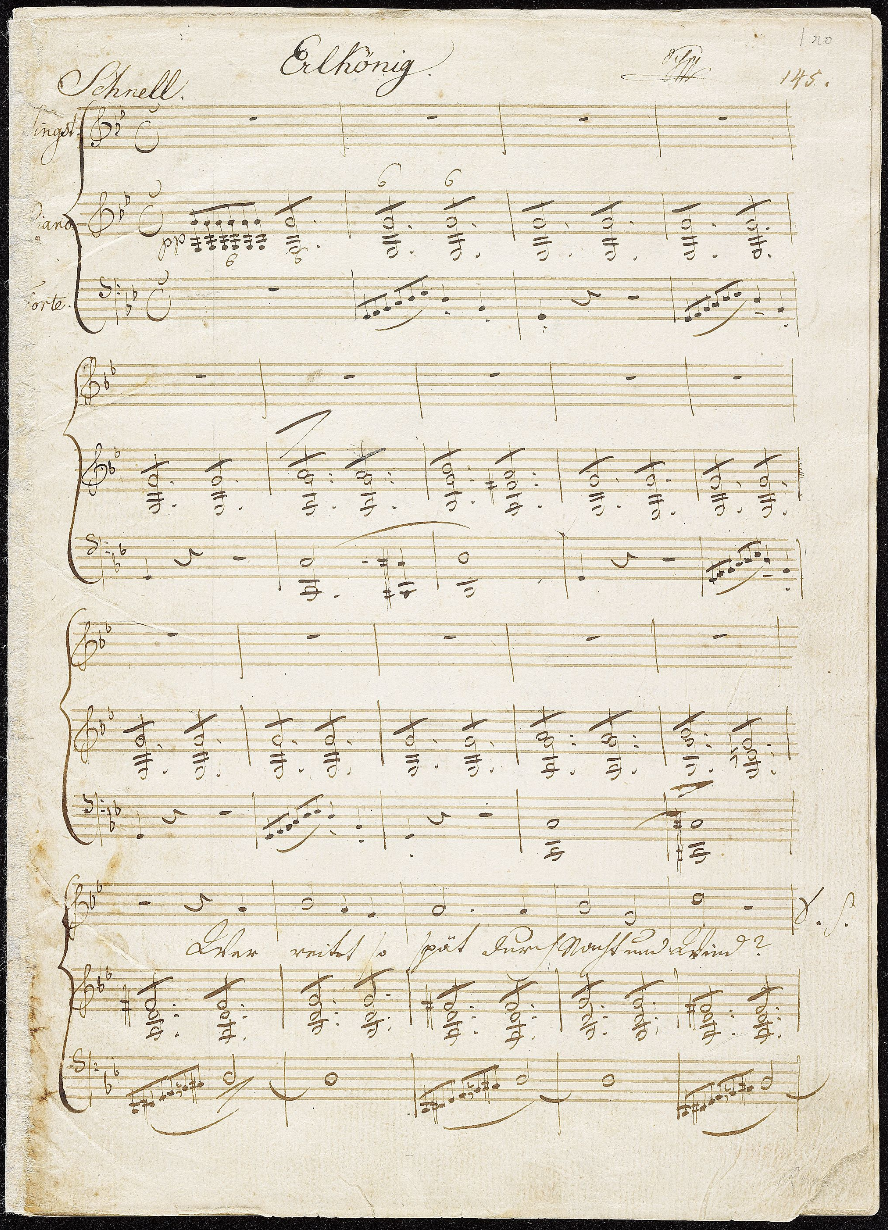
Schubert's manuscript, c. 1815

Schubert's adaptation of "Erlkönig" is a romantic musical realization which represents the various rational and irrational elements of Goethe's ballad, through contrasting yet unifying musical elements. Its form is the through-composed song; although the melodic motives recur, the harmonic structure is constantly changing and the piece modulates within the four characters.

=== Characters ===
The four characters in the song – narrator, father, son, and the Erlking – are all sung by a single vocalist. The narrator lies in the middle range and begins in the minor mode. The father lies in the lower range and sings in both minor and major mode. The son lies in a higher range, also in the minor mode. The Erlking's vocal line, in the major mode, provides the only break from the ostinato bass triplets in the accompaniment until the boy's death. Schubert places each character largely in a different tessitura, and each has his own rhythmic and harmonic nuances; in addition, most singers endeavor to use a different vocal coloration for each part.

A fifth character, the horse on which the father and boy are riding, is implied in rapid triplet figures played by the pianist throughout the work, mimicking hoof beats.

=== Structure ===
"Erlkönig"
Full performance

"Erlkönig" begins with the piano playing rapid triplets to create a sense of urgency and simulate the horse's galloping. The moto perpetuo triplets continue throughout the entire song except for the final three bars and mostly comprise the uninterrupted repeated chords or octaves in the right hand that were established at the opening.

In the introduction, the left hand of the piano part introduces an ominous bass motif composed of rising scale in triplets and a falling arpeggio, pointing to the background of the scene and suggesting the urgency of the father's mission. It also introduces a chromatic "passing note motif" consisting of C–C♯-D that represents a daemonic force, and used throughout the work.

==== Verse 1 ====
Wer reitet so spät durch Nacht und Wind?
Es ist der Vater mit seinem Kind;
Er hat den Knaben wohl in dem Arm,
Er fasst ihn sicher, er hält ihn warm.

Translation:

Who rides, so late, through night and wind?
It is a father with his child.
He has the boy well in his arm
He holds him safely, he keeps him warm.

After a long introduction of fifteen measures, the narrator raises the question "Wer reitet so spät durch Nacht und Wind?" and accentuates the key words "Vater" (father) and "seinem Kind" (his child) in the reply. A link between "Wind" and "Kind" is suggested in the placement in a major tonality. The verse ends where it started, in G minor, seemingly indicating the narrator's neutral point of view.

==== Verse 2 ====
"Mein Sohn, was birgst du so bang dein Gesicht?"
"Siehst, Vater, du den Erlkönig nicht?
Den Erlenkönig mit Kron' und Schweif?"
"Mein Sohn, es ist ein Nebelstreif."

Translation:

"My son, why do you hide your face in fear?"
"Father, do you not see the Erlking?
The Erlking with crown and tail?"
"My son, it is a streak of fog."

The father's question to his son is harmonically supported by a modulation from the tonic to the subdominant, also employing the "passing note motif" from the introduction. The son's distress is represented by the high pitch of this reply and the repetitive nature of the phrase. As the child mentions the Erlking, the harmony passes into F major, representing a gravitation from the father's tonality to the Erlking. The father calms the son, which is expressed by the low register of the singing voice.

==== Verse 3 ====
"Du liebes Kind, komm, geh mit mir!
Gar schöne Spiele spiel' ich mit dir;
Manch' bunte Blumen sind an dem Strand,
Meine Mutter hat manch gülden Gewand."

Translation:

"You dear child, come, go with me!
Very lovely games I'll play with you;
Some colorful flowers are on the beach,
My mother has some golden robes."

After a short piano interlude, the Erlking starts to address the boy in a charming, flattering melody in B♭ major, placing emphasis on the words "liebes" (dear) and "geh" (go). The descending intervals of the melody seems to provide a soothing response to the boy's fear. Though the Erlking's seductive verses differ in their accompanying figurations (providing some relief for the pianist), they are still based on triplets, not letting the daemonic presence be forgotten. The "passing note motif" is used twice.

==== Verse 4 ====
"Mein Vater, mein Vater, und hörest du nicht,
Was Erlenkönig mir leise verspricht?"
"Sei ruhig, bleibe ruhig, mein Kind;
In dürren Blättern säuselt der Wind."

Translation:

"My father, my father, and do you not hear
What Erlking quietly promises me?"
"Be calm, stay calm, my child;
The wind is rustling through dry leaves."

The son's fear and anxiety in response to the Erlking's words is highlighted by the immediate resumption of the original triplet motif, just after the Erlking finishes his verse. The chromaticism in the son's melody indicates a call to his father, creating dissonances between the vocal part and the bass that evoke the boy's horror. The harmonic instability in this verse allude to the child's feverish wandering. The father's tonal center becomes increasingly distant from the child's, suggesting a rivalry over possession of the boy with the Erlking.

==== Verse 5 ====
"Willst, feiner Knabe, du mit mir gehn?
Meine Töchter sollen dich warten schön;
Meine Töchter führen den nächtlichen Reihn,
Und wiegen und tanzen und singen dich ein,
Sie wiegen und tanzen und singen dich ein."

Translation:

"Do you, fine boy, want to go with me?
My daughters shall wait on you finely;
My daughters lead the nightly dance,
And rock and dance and sing you to sleep,
They rock and dance and sing you to sleep."

The Erlkönig's enticement intensifies. The piano accompaniment transforms into flowing major arpeggios that may refer to the dances of the Erlking's daughters and the troubled half-sleep of the child. The presence of the daemonic is once again highlighted by the "passing note motif". As in the Erlking's first verse, the octave triplets resume immediately after the verse.

==== Verse 6 ====
"Mein Vater, mein Vater, und siehst du nicht dort
Erlkönigs Töchter am düstern Ort?"
"Mein Sohn, mein Sohn, ich seh' es genau:
Es scheinen die alten Weiden so grau."

Translation:

"My father, my father, and don't you see there
Erlking's daughters in the gloomy place?"
"My son, my son, I see it clearly:
There shimmer the old willows so grey."

The son cries out to his father, his fear again illustrated in rising pitch and chromaticism.

==== Verse 7 ====
"Ich liebe dich, mich reizt deine schöne Gestalt;
Und bist du nicht willig, so brauch' ich Gewalt."
"Mein Vater, mein Vater, jetzt fasst er mich an!
Erlkönig hat mir ein Leids getan!"

Translation:

"I love you, your beautiful form excites me;
And if you're not willing, then I will use force."
"My father, my father, he's touching me now!
Erlking has done me harm!"

Before the Erlking speaks again, the ominous bass motif foreshadows the outcome of the song. The Erlkönig's luring now becomes more insistent. He threatens the boy, the initial lyricism and playfulness yielding to a measured declamation, with the "passing note motif" being voiced both in the treble and in the bass. Upon the word "Gewalt" (force), the tonality has modulated from E♭ major to D minor, with the Erlking appropriating the minor tonality originally associated with the father and his child. The boy cries out to his father a final time, heard in fff. The "passing note motif" on the word "Erlkönig" suggest that the fate of the child is sealed.

==== Verse 8 ====
Dem Vater grauset's, er reitet geschwind,
Er hält in Armen das ächzende Kind,
Erreicht den Hof mit Müh' und Not;
In seinen Armen das Kind war tot.

Translation:

It horrifies the father, he swiftly rides on,
He holds the groaning child in his arms,
Reaches the farm with great difficulty;
In his arms, the child was dead.

The music intensifies further, Schubert once again creating tension through the "galloping motif". The grace notes in the voice line suggest the father's horror, and the music accelerates on the words "er reitet geschwind" (he swiftly rides on). A final allusion to the father's tonality of C minor is followed by the Neapolitan chord of A♭ major, as the father spurs his horse to go faster and then arrives at his destination. Before this chord is resolved, the triplet motif stops, and the final rendition of the "passing note motif" in the bass seems to seal the fate of the boy.

The recitative, in absence of the piano, draws attention to the dramatic text and amplifies the immense loss and sorrow caused by the Son's death.

The resolution of C♯ to D major implies a "submission to the daemonic forces", followed by the final cadence delivering "a perfect consummation to the song".

==== Tonality ====
The song has a tonal scheme based on rising semitones which portrays the increasingly desperate situation:

| Verse | Measures | Tonality | Character |
|---|---|---|---|
| | 1–15 | G minor | (Introduction) |
| 1 | 16–36 | G minor | Narrator |
| 2 | 37–57 | G minor → B♭ major | Father and Son |
| 3 | 58–72 | B♭ major | Erlking |
| 4 | 72–85 | (D^{7}) → B minor | Son |
| | | → G major | Father |
| 5 | 86–96 | C major | Erlking |
| 6 | 97–116 | (E^{7}) → C♯ minor | Son |
| | | D minor | Father |
| 7 | 117–131 | E♭ major → D minor | Erlking |
| | | (F^{7}) → G minor | Son |
| 8 | 132–147 | G minor | Narrator |

The "Mein Vater, mein Vater" music appears three times on a prolonged dominant seventh chord that slips chromatically into the next key. Following the tonal scheme, each cry is a semitone higher than the last, and, as in Goethe's poem, the time between the second two cries is less than the first two, increasing the urgency like a large-scale stretto. Much of the major-key music is coloured by the flattened submediant, giving it a darker, unsettled sound.

== Reception and legacy ==
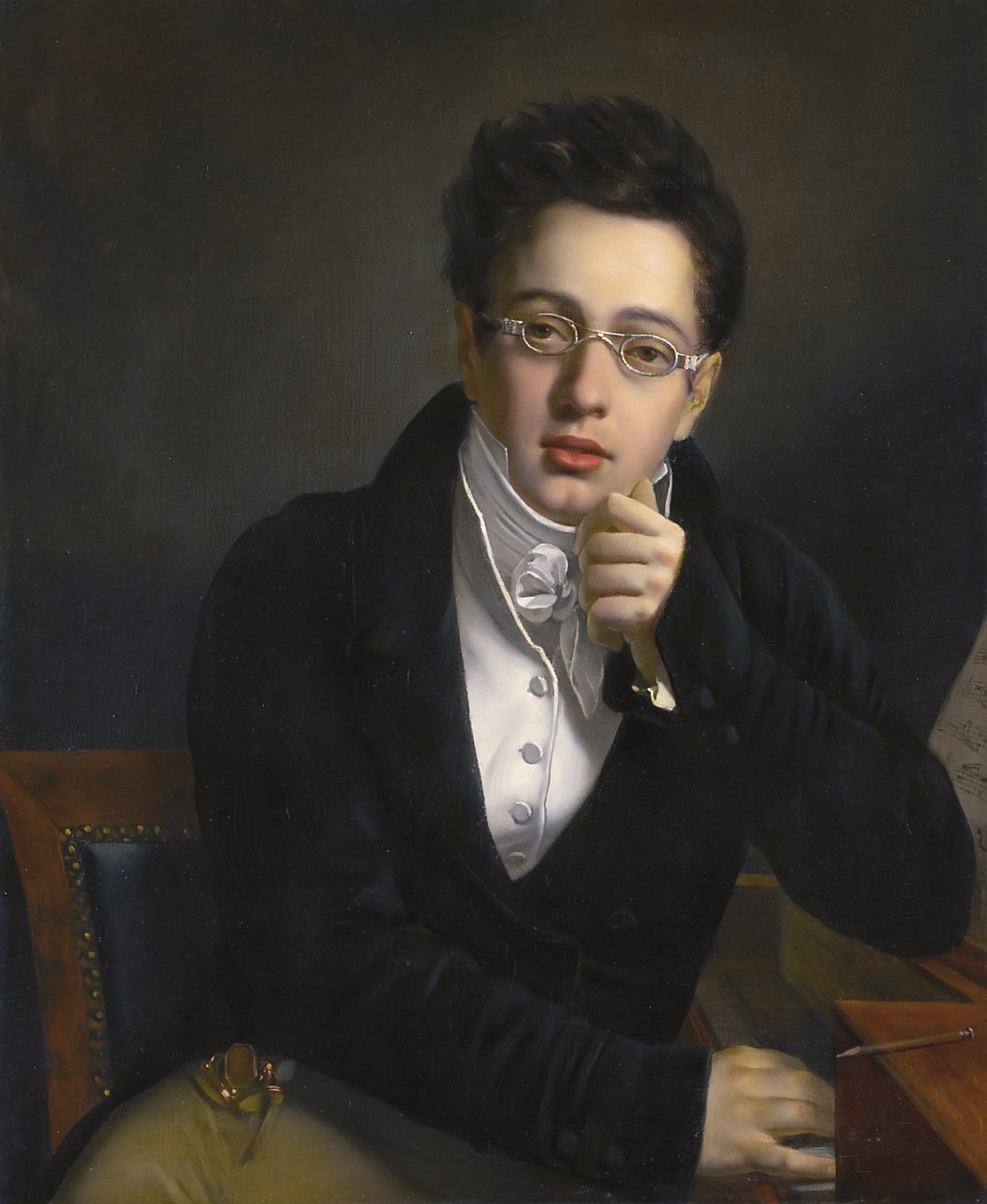
Possible portrait (retouched) of Schubert c. 1814, painted by Josef Abel

The premiere in 1821 was an immediate success; the large audience broke out in "rapturous applause", as Joseph von Spaun reported. During the 1820s and 30s, "Erlkönig" was unanimously acclaimed among the Schubert circle, critics and general audiences, with critics hailing the work as "a masterpiece of musical painting", "a composition full of fantasy and feeling, which had to be repeated", "an ingenious piece" that leaves an "indelible impression". No other performance of Schubert's work during his lifetime would receive more attention than "Erlkönig".

Joseph von Spaun sent the composition to Goethe, hoping to receive his approval for a print. The latter, however, sent it back without comment, as he categorically rejected Schubert's form of the through-composed song. However, when Wilhelmine Schröder-Devrient performed "Erlkönig" before Goethe in 1830, he is reported by Eduard Genast to have said: "I have heard this composition once before, when it did not appeal to me at all; but sung in this way the whole shapes itself into a visible picture".

"Erlkönig" has had enjoyed enduring popularity since its inception to this day. Dietrich Fischer-Dieskau has highlighted the piano accompaniment in the setting, which he describes as having a "compositional life of its own", with important motifs such as the repeated octaves that create an eerie, suspenseful atmosphere. Furthermore, Fischer-Dieskau praised the "magnificent tragedy" of the setting.

Graham Johnson writes that "Erlkönig is one of those songs that defies age (the composer's, particularly) and defines an age. Like Beethoven's Fifth Symphony it appeals to the great unwashed and the squeaky-clean in equal measure, to those who see something symbolic in the poem, and to those who simply love a rattling good yarn excitingly told. It was that rare thing: a hit that absolutely deserved to be."

The piece is regarded as challenging to perform due to the multiple characters the vocalist is required to portray, as well as its difficult accompaniment, involving rapidly repeated chords and octaves.

== Arrangements ==
"Erlkönig" has been arranged for various settings: for solo piano by Franz Liszt (1838, revised 1876; S. 558/4), for solo violin by Heinrich Wilhelm Ernst (1854; Grand Caprice für Violine allein, Op. 26), and for solo voice and orchestra by Hector Berlioz (1860; H. 136, NBE 22b), Franz Liszt (1860; S. 375/4) and Max Reger (1914).

Brian Newbould wrote on the arrangements: "Most, like Liszt's transcriptions of the Lieder or Berlioz's orchestration for Erlkönig, tell us more about the arranger than about the original composer, but they can be diverting so long as they are in no way a replacement for the original."

=== For solo piano (Liszt) ===
External videos
- For solo piano
- by Liszt, performed by George Harliono
- by Liszt, performed by Valentina Lisitsa

Franz Liszt arranged "Erlkönig" for solo piano as part of his Twelve Songs by Franz Schubert, S. 558, which was published in 1838 and revised in 1876. Compared to the original, Liszt retains many of the basic musical elements, including melody, harmony, accompanimental patterns, and dynamics. The melody is transcribed to different registers of the piano: the narrator and the son remain in the same register as the voice, the father moves an octave lower, and the Erlking moves an octave higher. Liszt, being a virtuoso pianist, adds even more technical challenges for the pianist, for instance turning the bass motif in the left hand into octaves:

A critic for the Courrier de Lyon remarked on these octaves: "Those scales, so numerous and so rapid, whose rolling, like that of the thunder, made the listeners tremble with terror, who else but Liszt, in order to increase their sonority, would have dared play them in octaves?"

Liszt performed his "Erlkönig" 65 times during his tours of Germany between 1840 and 1845, more than any of his operatic paraphrases. Ludwig Rellstab, who reviewed one such concert, wrote in 1841 in the Vossische Zeitung: "To a quite different sphere, increasing the sensual excitement still further, belonged his playing of Schubert’s Erlkönig, a work widely known and heard, and yet now heard for the first time, truly electrifying the audience, which caused it to be encored more by their ever-renewed applause than by express demand."

Commenting on Liszt's arrangements of Schubert's Lieder, Robert Schumann wrote: "[they] have found such favour with the public. Performed by Liszt, they must be highly effective, but other than master-hands will vainly labour with them; they are perhaps the most difficult things for the piano-forte in existence. A witty fellow wonders 'whether an easier arrangement could not be published, and also whether the result of such a one would be the original Schubert Lied again?' Not always. Liszt has added to and altered; the way in which he has done it betrays the powerful nature of his conception and execution; others would think and write differently. And now the old question suggests itself, whether the executive artist shall be allowed the privilege of modifying the works of the creative artist, so as to suit his individual powers? The answer is easy. A bungler is ridiculous when he does it badly, but we approve of the intelligent artist's arrangement, unless he destroys the sense of the original. This kind of workmanship forms a separate chapter in a method of pianoforte-playing."

=== For solo violin (Ernst) ===
External audio
- For solo violin
- by Ernst, performed by Gidon Kremer
- by Ernst, performed by Vilde Frang

Heinrich Wilhelm Ernst composed his Grand Caprice for solo violin on "Erlkönig" (German: Grand Caprice für Violine allein), Op. 26, in 1854, in what represents the "pinnacle of violin technique". The work is characterized by its highly polyphonic nature, the solo violin having to perform the narrator, the Erlkönig, the father, and the child (4 independent voices) in their different vocal colourations, while maintaining an accompaniment at the same time. This is accomplished through the use of double, triple and quadruple stops, artificial harmonics and left-hand pizzicato.

=== For voice and orchestra ===
External audio
- For voice and orchestra
- by Berlioz, performed by Stanislas de Barbeyrac with the Insula Orchestra under Laurence Equilbey
- by Liszt, performed by Michael Volle with the Munich Radio Orchestra under Ralf Weikert
- by Reger, performed by Thomas Quasthoff with the Chamber Orchestra of Europe under Claudio Abbado

Arrangement for contralto and orchestra
"Erlkönig"
Performed by Ernestine Schumann-Heink with the Victor Orchestra (1913)

==== Berlioz ====
In 1846, during a visit to Prague, Berlioz witnessed a new musical rendition of Goethe's "Erlkönig" by Czech composer Václav Tomášek. As recalled by Berlioz in his memoirs, the two composers were soon drawn into an argument comparing Tomášek's composition to Schubert's: "Someone (for there are people who find fault with everything) drew a comparison between the accompaniment of this piece and that of Schubert's ballad, in which the furious gallop of the horse is reproduced, and declared that M. Tomášek had mimicked the placid gait of a priest's nag. An intelligent critic, however, more capable than his neighbours of judging of the philosophy of art, annihilated this irony, and replied with great good sense: 'It is just because Schubert made that unlucky horse gallop so wildly that it has foundered, and is now forced to go at a foot pace.'"

When Gustave-Hippolyte Roger asked him to orchestrate Schubert's work for a performance in Baden-Baden in 1860, Berlioz was too willing, as he felt that Schubert's piano accompaniment was essentially orchestral in nature. The arrangement was premiered at Baden-Baden on 27 August 1860, and was published in Paris the same year. Berlioz's biographer Jacques Barzun wrote of the arrangement: "From the finely wrought and polished score no one could suspect anything of the anxiety, illness, or conflicts in his heart and soul. It is delicate, poignant, full of insight into Schubert's masterpiece – a compendium of art concealing itself."

Berlioz's arrangement is scored for two flutes, oboe, English horn, two clarinets, two bassoons, three horns, two trumpets, timpani, strings, and solo voice.

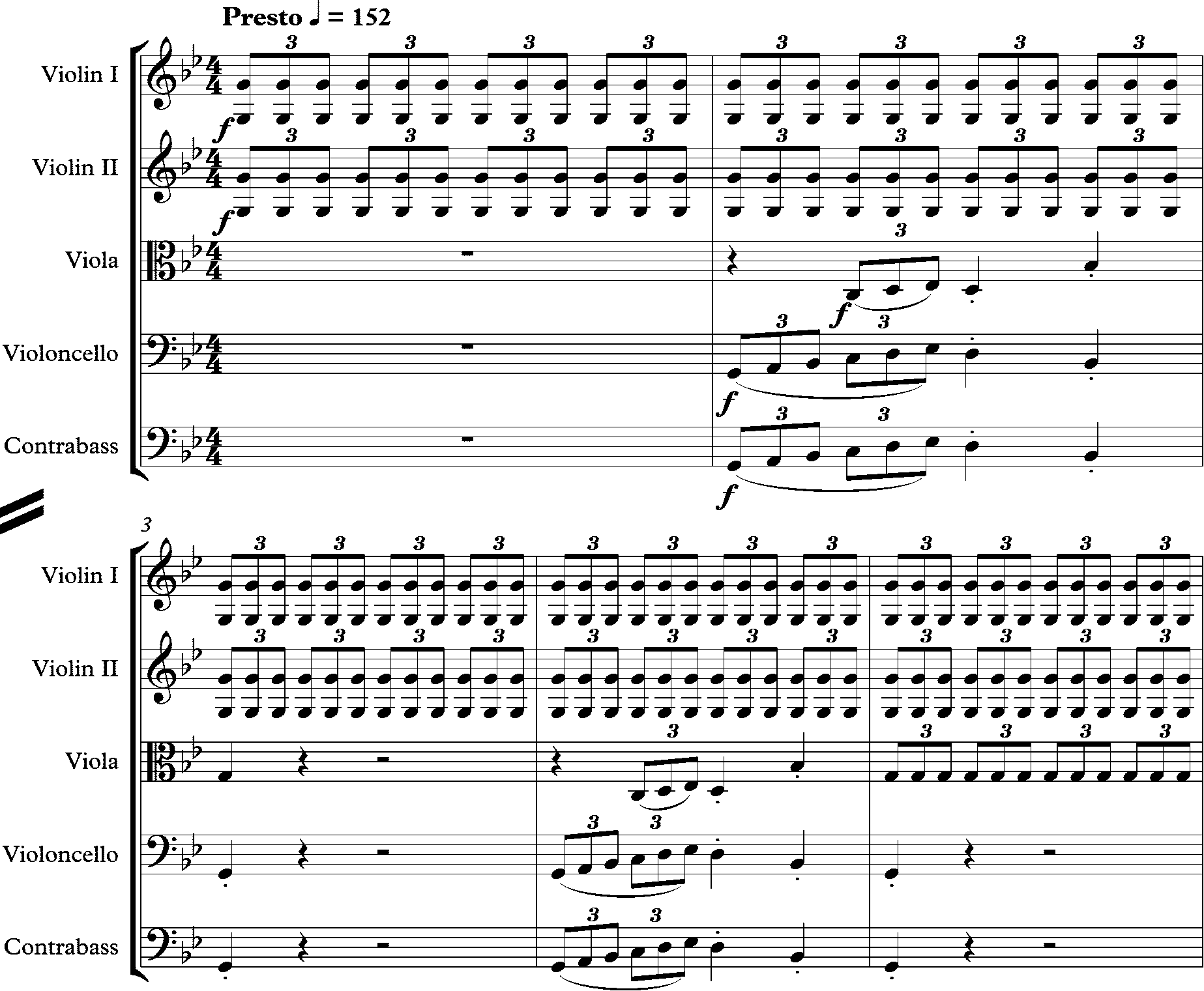

==== Liszt ====
During his later Weimar years, with many of his major works having been published, Liszt turned his attention to orchestral transcriptions. On Johann von Herbeck's request, who was the conductor of the Vienna Philharmonic, Liszt produced transcriptions of Schubert's marches. With his orchestration of the Reitermarsch (S. 363/3) have been a success, he decided to orchestrate six Lieder: "Die junge Nonne", "Gretchen am Spinnrade", "Lied der Mignon", "Erlkönig", "Der Doppelgänger", and "Abschied". Of these, which were completed in 1860, only the first four would be published in 1863 as Four Songs by Franz Schubert (S. 375). Ben Arnold notes the irony that Berlioz's arrangement, his only transcription of a Schubert song, was written in the same year.

Liszt's arrangement is scored for two flutes, two oboes, two clarinets, two bassoons, two horns, two trumpets, timpani, harp, strings, and solo voice.

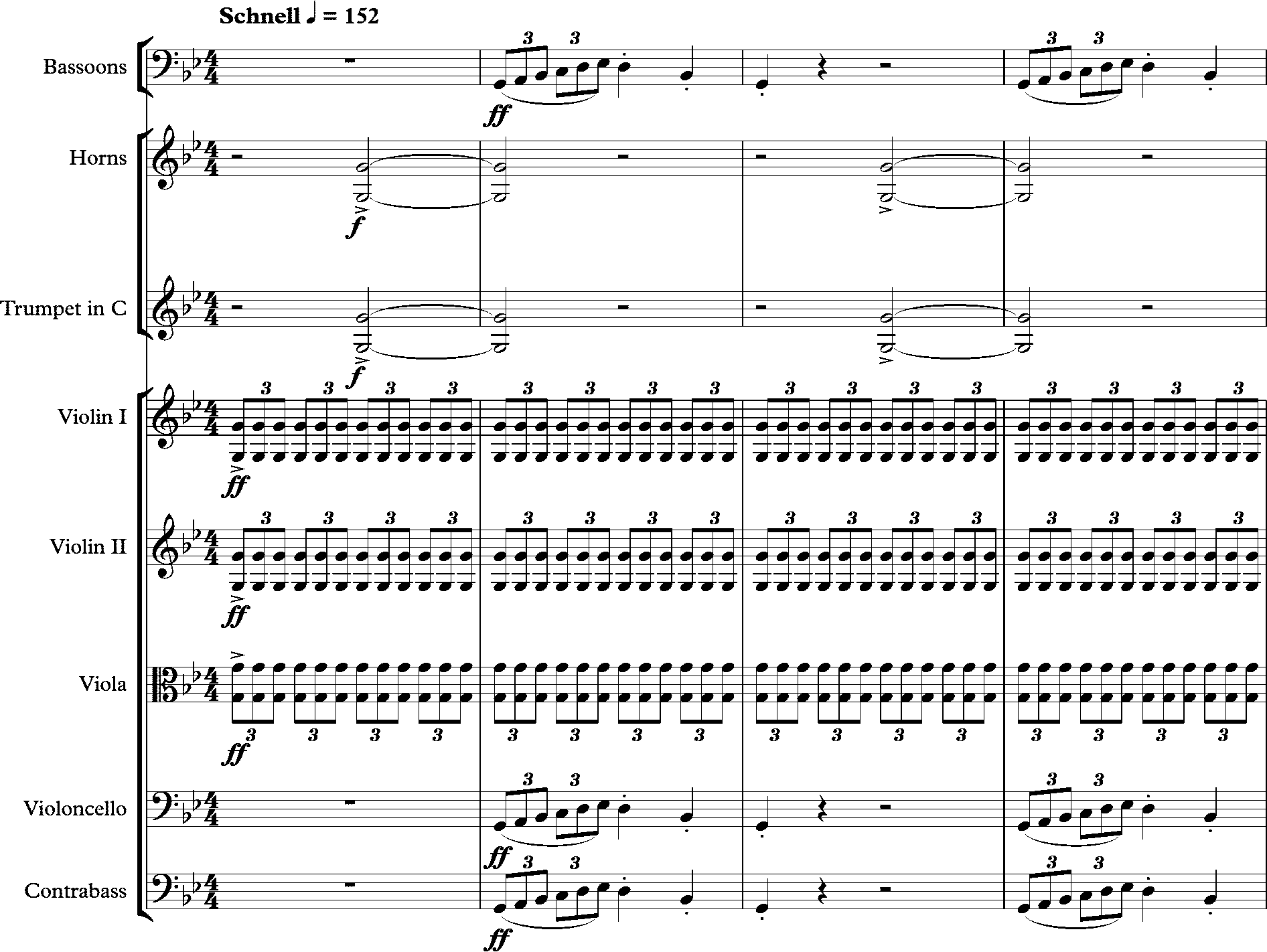
Erl King – arrangement by Liszt bars 1–4

==== Reger ====
Reger was influential in the development of the orchestral Lied. He wrote: "To my ear, it is often a real insult to have to listen to a singer, following an orchestral piece in a gigantic hall, performing lieder to the spindly accompaniment of a piano in the huge space. But it goes without saying that one must make a very careful choice of the songs to be orchestrated."

After he was appointed music director of the Meiningen Court Orchestra in December 1911, Reger seems to have used the orchestra to experiment in orchestration. Between 1913 and 1914, he completed 45 orchestral arrangements of songs written by himself and others. He wrote to his publisher: "The instrumentation will ensure that the singer is never 'muffled'. I have so often noticed that the performance of songs in symphonic concerts has suffered greatly due to the fact that the gentlemen conducting were not really the best accompanists. This grievance will be remedied by the instrumentation; and dragging an extra grand piano on to the stage will not even be necessary... After having rehearsed daily for two whole winters, as it were, with the Meiningen Court Orchestra, and having performed many songs (solo songs!) with the orchestra, I know precisely how to orchestrate such matters."

Reger's arrangement of "Erlkönig" was completed in 1914, together with "Gretchen am Spinnrade", "Gruppe aus dem Tartarus", "Prometheus", and "Gesänge des Harfners". In the work, the restless piano accompaniment is performed by the strings, with the flute supporting the seductive sound of the Erlkönig.

Reger's arrangement is scored for flute, oboe, two clarinets, bassoon, two horns, timpani, strings, and solo voice.
