= Georgiana Zornlin =

British writer and artist

Georgiana Margaretta Zornlin (1800–1881) was an English artist and writer.

She was the daughter of John Jacob Zornlin, a London merchant of Swiss background, and Elizabeth Alsager, who was the sister of the journalist Thomas Massa Alsager. The science writer Rosina Zornlin was her sister. In 1821 she published early lithographs of Christchurch, Hampshire with Joseph Netherclift. In the 1820s she was a pupil of Benjamin Robert Haydon.

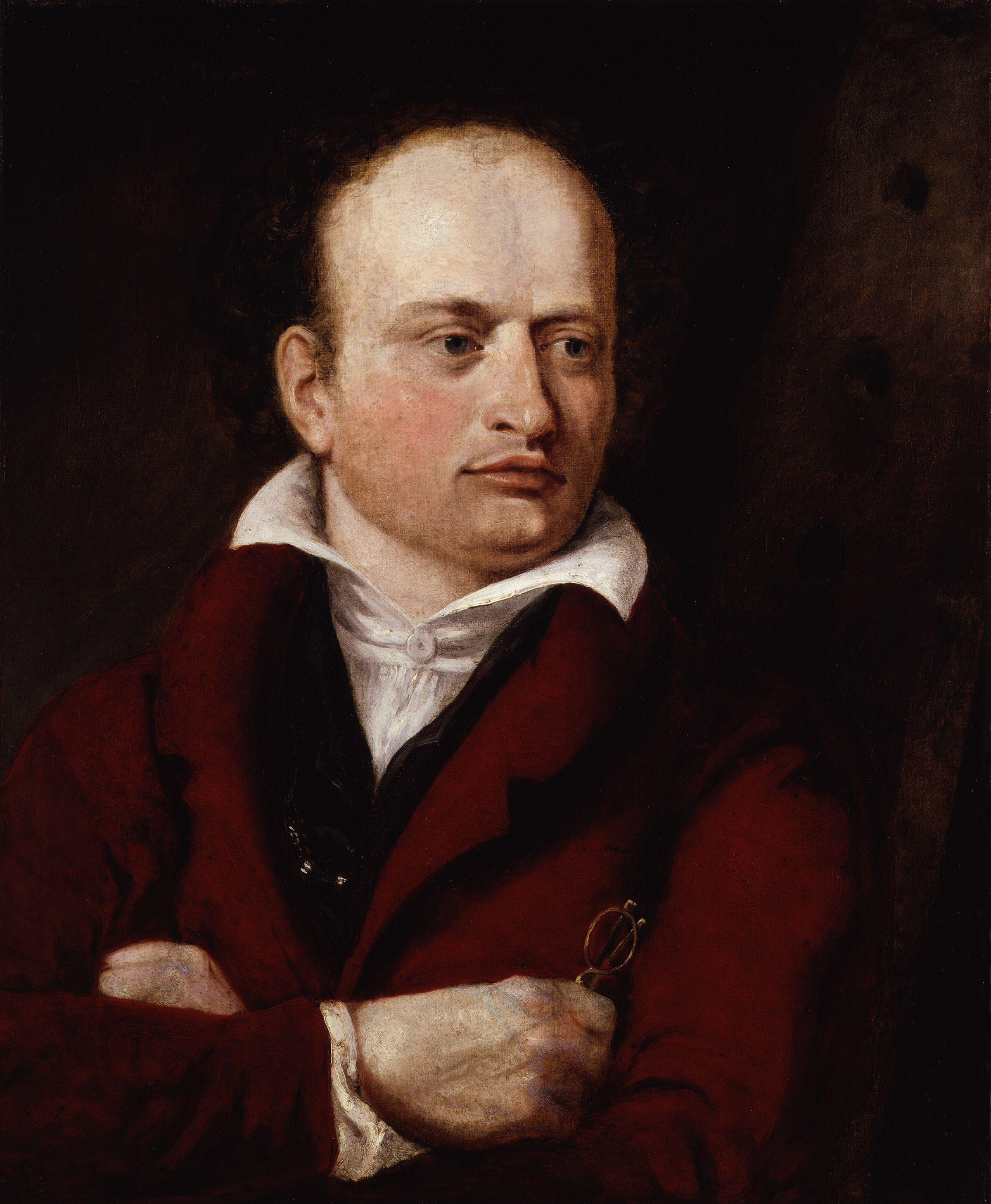
Benjamin Robert Haydon, 1825 portrait by Georgiana Zornlin

Zornlin wrote an anonymous illustrated work A Paper Lantern for Puseyites, a light-hearted poetic spoof on young Tractarians. She also published works on the urim and thummim, and heraldry. William Jaggard's Shakespeare Bibliography (1911) records three papers of hers for the Shakespeare Society.
