= Caspar Othmayr =

German Lutheran pastor and composer

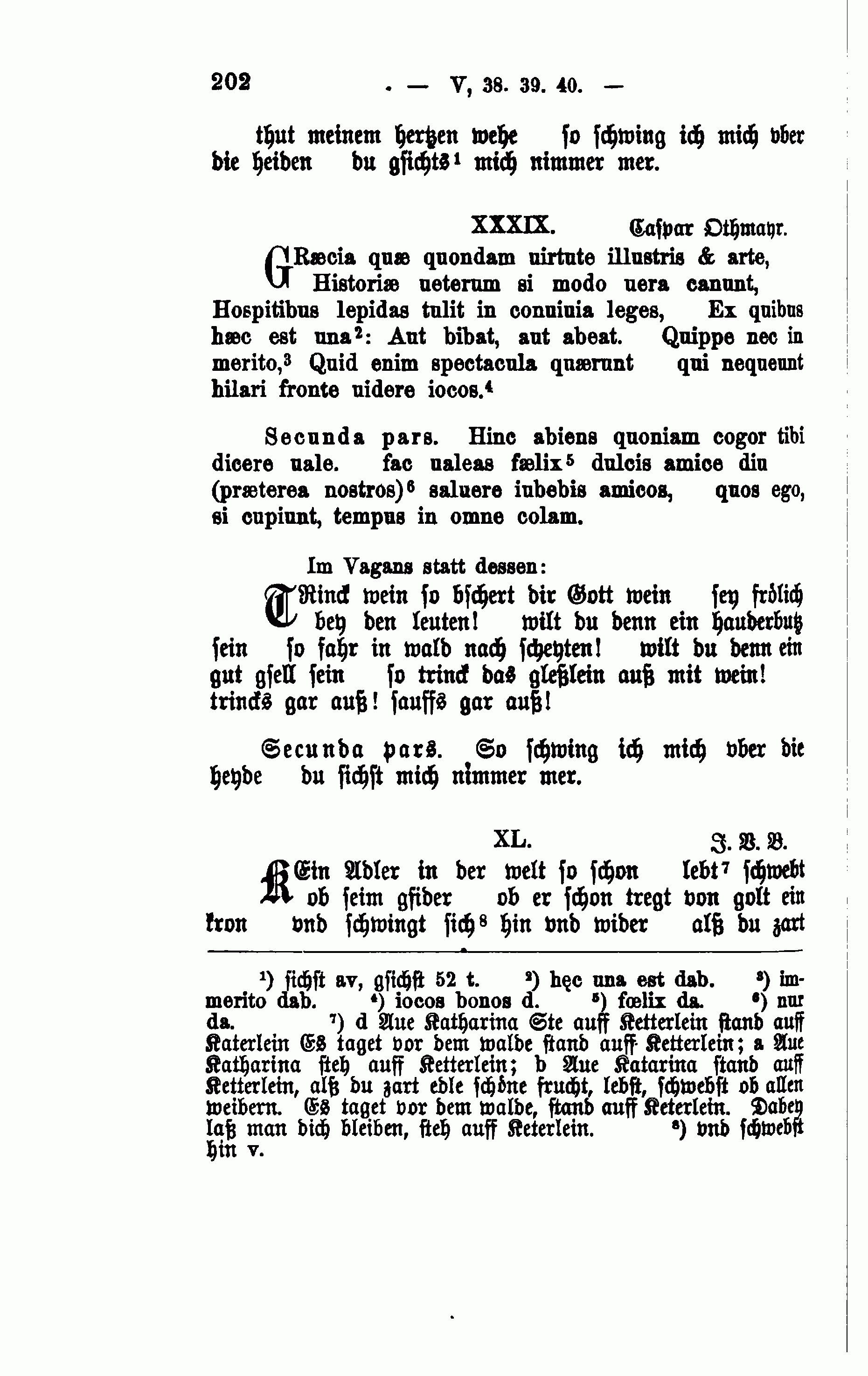
A work by Caspar Othmayr (in Frische teutsche Liedlein, p. 202)

Caspar Othmayr (12 March 1515 – 4 February 1553) was a German Lutheran pastor and composer.

Othmayr was born in Amberg, Upper Palatinate, and studied in Heidelberg as a pupil of Lorenz Lemlin, among others. Later, he became rector of the monastery school of Heilsbronn near Ansbach. From 1548 on he was provost in Ansbach, but soon lost the position because of theological differences.

Othmayr is considered one of the masters of melodic phrasing (Liedsatz) of the middle of the 16th century. The most important works were written from 1545 to 1550. He composed numerous hymns inspired by Martin Luther, and in 1546 wrote Epitaphium a Lutheri in memory of him.

His works are found in numerous collections of his time, as in Georg Forster's Frische teutsche Liedlein.

Othmayr died in Nuremberg in 1553 at the age of 37.

== Bibliography ==
- Robert Eitner (1887). "Othmayr, Caspar". Allgemeine Deutsche Biographie (in German). Vol. 24. Leipzig: Duncker & Humblot. pp. 536–537.
- Lothar Hoffmann-Erbrecht (1999). "Othmayr, Caspar". Neue Deutsche Biographie (in German). Vol. 19. Berlin: Duncker & Humblot. pp. 644–645.
