= Rosina Zornlin =

British author (1795–1859)

- Born: 6 December 1795; Walthamstow, Essex, England
- Died: 22 May 1859 (aged 63); Kenilworth, Warwickshire, England
- Occupation: Author
- Relatives: Georgiana Zornlin (sister)

Rosina Maria Zornlin (6 December 1795 – 22 May 1859) was a British writer who wrote science popularizations and works on religion.

== Life and works ==
Rosina Zornlin was born on 6 December 1795 in Walthamstow, Essex, England to a literary family. Her father was John Jacob Zornlin, a London merchant of Swiss background. Her mother, Elizabeth Alsager, was the sister of Thomas Massa Alsager and had published some poetry. Her sister, Georgiana Zornlin, was an author and an artist. An invalid, Rosina spent most of her life living with her family in Clapham, Surrey. She was involved with the Clapham Microscopical Society. An amateur astronomer, she published two articles in The Philosophical Magazine on meteor showers in 1839 and 1841 and was interested enough in physics to have a paper read to the British Association for the Advancement of Science entitled On Heat and on the Indestructibility of Elementary Bodies in 1858. Zornlin also published two non-fiction books on the Bible narrative and an anti-Catholic novel entitled, The Roman Catholic Chapel, or, Lindenhurst Parish in 1837.

Many of her earlier works, such as What Is a Comet, Papa? (1835, James Ridgway & Sons), The Solar Eclipse (1836, James Ridgway & Sons), and What Is a Voltaic Battery? (1842, John Parker), were written for children. To make scientific ideas accessible to this younger audience, Zornlin adopted the ‘familiar format’, a fictional literary format that used letters, dialogues, and conversations, customarily situated in a domestic setting. Zornlin's earliest scientific books took advantage of astronomical phenomena like the 1835 approach of Halley's Comet and the 1836 solar eclipse visible in England. One reviewer criticized Zornlin because she "unconsciously takes for granted that the pupil is [already] familiar with the phenomena which she undertakes to explain." Zornlin's other scientific books used a clear, textbook style of prose.

Zornlin's other books were geared towards adults and to school use. Several of them sold well enough to go into multiple editions, including Recreations in Geology, The World of Waters, Recreations in Physical Geography. All of them reached third editions.

Her first book on geology, Recreations in Geology, was published in 1839 and she was heavily influenced by the Natural Theology of William Paley.

== The Voltaic Battery ==
One of Rosina Zornlin's very well known work is her writing What is the Voltaic Battery? which was honored in the British Periodicals in 1842. Rosina's writing sets her apart from many because she used different styles, like in What is the Voltaic Battery? she writes in a dialogue between two people. One person (E) asks Mr. C various questions about a voltaic battery including how it works, what its made of, and how much power it can generate. She helped educate people about the voltaic battery by including questions often thought of about the voltaic battery.

== Continued Works of Rosina Zornlin ==
Rosina Zornlin wrote many popular books including The World of Waters and The Earth as It Is in which she compares the earth before and after mankind. Rosina Zornlin initially wrote for juvenile readers but eventually wrote more works for adult audiences ranging in many different scientific topics often using dialogues to explain the subject she was writing about. Her style of writing became very popular among many different groups of people, giving them an entertaining way to learn about geology and various other physical sciences.
