= Beethoven Quartet Society =

The Beethoven Quartet Society was a musical society established in 1845 in London dedicated to the String quartets of Ludwig van Beethoven.

The society was established by Thomas Massa Alsager (1779–1846). Its establishment was encouraged by Alsager's "Queen Square Select Society" and John Ella's Musical Union. The Beethoven Quartet Society was based at the Beethoven Rooms at 76 Harley Street, London. Concerts were given under the title "Honour to Beethoven", and included works by other composers. One of its express aims was to study the late quartets from score. After Alsager's death in 1846 French cellist Scipion Rousselot directed the society. Violist Henry Hill (1808–1856) undertook writing the programme notes.

The society were the first to present a performance of the complete cycle of the Beethoven string quartets, running from 21 April 1845 and 16 June 1845, with Camillo Sivori, Prosper Sainton, Henry Hill and Scipion Rousselot.

Other musicians, who played at the society's concerts, include Joseph Joachim, Henryk Wieniawski (both as violinist and violist), Heinrich Wilhelm Ernst, Alfredo Piatti, Louis Ries, William Sterndale Bennett and Ludwig Straus.

One particular line-up during the 1850s was noted by Joachim's biographer Andreas Moser with Joachim and Ernst playing the violin, Wieniawski the viola, and Piatti the cello. This has been considered unlikely since Ernst's last stay is said to date from 1858, but a photograph from 1859 indeed shows the four virtuosi together.

Hector Berlioz attended at least one of the society's concerts at the "New Beethoven Room" (at the building at 27 Queen Anne Street, where Berlioz lived) and this made enough of an impression to mention it in his book Evenings with the Orchestra.
