= William Ayrton (music critic) =

English music critic

William Ayrton FRS FSA (22 February 1777 – 8 May 1858) was an English opera manager and music critic.

== Early life ==
Ayrton was the younger son of Dr. Edmund Ayrton, and was born in London. The Ayrton family originated in Yorkshire and William's grandfather Edward Ayrton was mayor of Ripon in 1760, laying the foundations for the family's subsequent prominence.

== Career ==
Impresario

In 1816, Ayrton travelled to the Continent, to engage singers for the Italian opera at the King's Theatre. The following year he directed the productions, staging the first-ever performance of Mozart's Don Giovanni in England, and also introducing English audiences to such great artists as: Giuditta Pasta, Violante Camporese, Gaetano Crivelli and Giuseppe Ambrogietti.

In spite of a successful season, Ayrton was obliged to retire from the direction, due to various disputes within the company. In 1821, under the management of John Ebers, Ayrton again took the post of musical director but, owing to opposition he encountered from the committee, he was again forced to resign.

Writer

For the rest of his life, Ayrton concentrated on writing. From 1823 to 1833 he edited and contributed largely to the periodical the Harmonicon. He was both a music and literary critic for the Morning Chronicle (1813–26) and The Examiner (1837–51). In 1834-1835 he published his Sacred Minstrelsy, and in 1834, 1835 and 1836 the work now known as the Musical Library: an early affordable collection of vocal and instrumental music.

Interests

Ayrton was a Fellow of the Royal Society, a Fellow of the Society of Antiquaries of London, and one of the original members of both the Royal Institution and the Athenæum Club. As a founding director of the Philharmonic Society of London, he also served for a time as its Music Director.

Legacy

The personal papers and correspondence of William Ayrton can now be found in the British Library. His son William Scrope Ayrton (1804-1885) annotated the material, with the collection eventually partly sold at auction and partly donated to the British Library by his great-granddaughter Phyllis Alsager Ayrton.

== Later life ==
William Ayrton married Marianne (Arnold), the daughter of the composer Samuel Arnold, on 17 May 1803. Their only son was also named William.

Ayrton died at Bridge Street, Westminster, on 8 March 1858, and is buried in the Kensal Green Cemetery, London.

== Descendants ==
William Scrope Ayrton (senior) (1804–1885) was William's son, a barrister of Middle Temple. He was an official on the Courts of Bankruptcy of Leeds and of London, but also wrote several textbooks on bankruptcy law. In addition, he served as a magistrate in Yorkshire. In 1847 he married Margaret (Alsager), a daughter of Thomas Alsager.

William Scrope Ayrton (junior) (1849–1902) was William's grandson, an official with HM.Consular Service. He served his entire career in China. His career began in 1869 with the customary entry-appointment of Student Interpreter. Early posts included: Niuzhuang, in 1881; Wuhu, in 1882; Hangkou (Wuhan), in 1885–1887. From 1892 to 1896 he was HM.Consul, Tamsui, on the island of Formosa. This became a significant appointment when the First Sino-Japanese War broke out in 1894 and Japan acquired the island in 1895. In 1896 Ayrton was posted as HM.Consul, Wenzhou. Ayrton married Ellen Louisa (McClatchie), sister of a fellow consular-officer, Thomas Russell Hillier McClatchie (d.1886); both were the children of the Rev. Thomas McClatchie, DD, MA, of the CMS in Shanghai.

Edward Ayrton (1882–1914) was William's great-grandson, a leading archaeologist.

Phyllis Alsager Ayrton (1884–1975) was William's great-granddaughter, a women's suffragist. She was a prominent Suffragette - though no direct relation of fellow-Suffragette Barbara Ayrton - having joined the Women's Social and Political Union (WSPU) in 1909. She was also a supporter of the Women's Party and campaigned in Smethwick, alongside the leading WSPU figure Flora Drummond, on behalf of Christabel Pankhurst in the 1918 Election, the first in which women could stand as candidates, or even vote. Earlier, Drummond and Ayrton had also trailed the Prime Minister on a visit to women workers in Manchester. Ayrton also escorted the Australian Premier when he also visited women war workers. Following the outbreak of the Second Sino-Japanese War in 1937, Ayrton went back to the Far East to help the 'refugees' (in modern parlance: Internally Displaced Persons (IDP)). She was thus, rather remarkably for an Englishwoman, present in both Sino-Japanese Wars. She was in Hong Kong when the Japanese launched their series of attacks on 8 (or 7, East of the date-line) December, 1941 and spent nearly four years in captivity, in Stanley Internment Camp. Despite the ordeal, she survived to live into her nineties.
