= Thomas Stoltzer =

German composer

Thomas Stoltzer, also Stolczer, Scholczer (c.1480–1526) was a German composer of the Renaissance.

== Life ==
Nothing is known of Stoltzer's early life, though he is thought to have come from the same family as Clemens Stoltzer, who was a town clerk in Schweidnitz, and to have been born in Schweidnitz, Silesia. Stoltzer may have studied with Heinrich Finck; while no concrete evidence of this association exists, he was at the least intimately familiar with Finck's work since he quotes from Finck's music copiously.

He served as a priest in Breslau from 1519, and was a supporter of the Reformation, though he never made public his sentiments. Louis II appointed him magister capellae in Ofen at the Hungarian court on May 8, 1522. Ludwig's wife, Mary, asked him to set Martin Luther's translations of psalms xii, xiii, xxxviii and lxxxvi, which he did between 1524 and 1526. One personal letter of Stoltzer's is still extant, dated February 23, 1526 and addressed to Albert, Duke of Prussia in Königsberg; in this letter Stoltzer relates the news of a recently completed psalm setting and intimates that he would like to join Albrecht's court. On this letter, there is additional writing, dated March 1526, which refers to him as "the late Thomas". It was previously thought that he had died at the Battle of Mohács in August 1526, but this is erroneous. He is thought to have died near Znaim, Moravia.

== Works ==
Stoltzer's extant works amount to some 150 pieces, gathered in 30 publications and 60 manuscripts. None of them date from Stoltzer's own lifetime. Stoltzer was most popular in Saxony, in the areas most directly affected by the Reformation; Georg Rhau was one of his most dedicated printers, issuing at least 70 of Stoltzer's works in his publications. His works remained in general circulation in German-speaking countries up until the end of the 16th century. While he composed in all of the standard sacred forms of his day, he concentrated on motets. His early motets often make use of numerological signifiers of religious importance; later works show influence from the Netherlands school of composers, such as imitation and the use of multiple choirs. Among his most popular motets was O admirabile commercium, which survives today in 11 sources.

He composed four masses, as well as fourteen introits spanning the church year from Christmas to Easter. His hymns were particularly beloved by Rhau, who printed 39 of them in 1542.

== Editions ==
- Newe deudsche geistliche Gesenge (1544), ed. J. Wolf, Denkmäler deutscher Tonkunst, 1908
- Das deutsche Gesellschaftslied in Österreich von 1480–1550, ed. L. Nowak, Denkmaler der Tonkunst im Österreich, 1930
- Thomas Stoltzer: Sämtliche lateinische Hymnen und Psalmen, ed. H. Albrecht and O. Gombosi, Denkmäler deutscher Tonkunst, 1931
- Thomas Stoltzer: Ausgewählte Werke, vol. i ed. H. Albrecht, Das Erbe deutscher Musik, 1942; vols. ii-iii ed. L. Hoffmann-Erbrecht, 1969, 1983
- Georg Forster: Frische teutsche Liedlein (1539–1556) ed. Kurt Gudewill, Das Erbe deutscher Musik, 1942
- Georg Rhau: Sacrorum hymnorum liber primus, ed. R. Gerber, Das Erbe deutscher Musik, 1942–43
- Georg Rhau: Vesperarum precum officia, ed. H.J. Moser, Musikdrucke aus den Jahren 1538 bis 1545 in praktischer Neuausgabe, 1960
