= Thomas Alsager =

English journalist and critic, a manager (1779–1846)

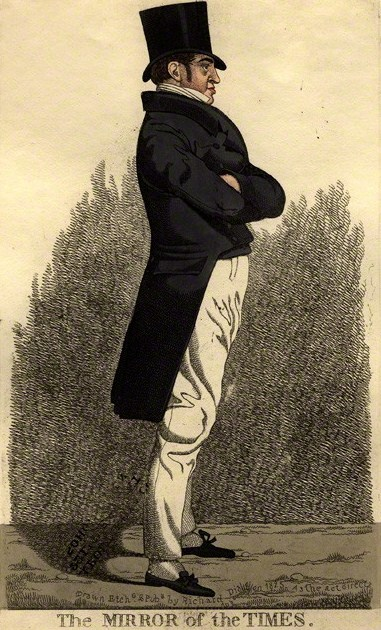
- Thomas Massa Alsager, 1823 engraving as "the Mirror of the Times"
- Born: Thomas Massa Alsager; 1779
- Died: 1846 (aged 66–67)
- Occupation(s): Journalist and critic, a manager of The Times newspaper

Thomas Massa Alsager (1779–1846) was an English journalist and critic, a manager of The Times newspaper. He was also a member of the "Cockney School" literary and musical circle.

== Early life ==
Alsager was the son of a clothworker from Southwark. He became acquainted with men of letters, including Charles Lamb and Leigh Hunt; and visited Leigh Hunt when he was in prison. He made his way in business, and as a factory owner.

== Journalism ==
Alsager became one of the small leading group at the Times, with John Walter who was the major shareholder, Thomas Barnes and Edward Sterling. He joined the paper in 1817, as a music critic, and later moved to the financial side. Alsager gradually bought himself into the paper, becoming a partner, and joint manager with William Delane. He was close to the banker Nathan Rothschild.

Much later, after 1845, Alsager left, after a scandal involving puffery. The position he had created for a professional music critic, an innovation by The Times, was taken over by James William Davison.

== Death ==
Alsager lost his wife in 1845 (they had 13 children). This was the period of the Railway Mania, and The Times had taken a position against rampant speculation; but Alsager and Delane were also said to have promoted the direct London and Exeter line, in which they had shares. Alsager's departure from the paper was at least nominally over an accounting matter. Year later and "since the death of his wife [...] he had been a saddened man[...] on November 6, he was found in bed with his throat cut. He was seriously injured, but a surgeon succeeded in reviving him; a relapse however, followed, and on November 15, he died".

== Literary connections ==
A copy of George Chapman's Homer belonging to Alsager has entered literary history. It was lent to Charles Cowden Clarke, who read it with John Keats, leading to the sonnet On First Looking into Chapman's Homer. On the committee of the Surrey Institution, Alsager persuaded William Hazlitt to give his 1818 Lectures on the English Poets there.

== Antiquary and clothworker ==
He became a Fellow of the Society of Antiquaries of London in 1837.

Son of a clothworker, Alsager was elected Master of The Clothworkers' Company (1836-7) and transformed the affairs of the organisation. He discovered that the Company’s financial affairs had been allowed to fall into a perilous state. Too much responsibility had been allowed to devolve upon the Clerk unchecked and as a result thorough reform was required. Alsager overhauled the Company’s administration; implementing new accounting procedures and introducing a system of standing committees with clear reporting structures for the first time. In so doing, he transformed the Company into a modern looking financial corporation, enabling it to enter a Victorian golden age in which it became more heavily involved in charitable work. For this reason he is considered the Company’s most important Master.

== Musical amateur ==
Alsager was one of the "Cockney Mozartians", with Edward Holmes, Cowden Clarke, Thomas Attwood, Henry Robertson and Vincent Novello. Another of the circle who was a personal friend was William Ayrton. The meetings of the "Queen Square Select Society" were at his house. He founded the Beethoven Quartet Society in 1845, which was partly instigated by the "Queen Square Select Society". The first complete British performance of Beethoven’s Missa solemnis took place at Alsager's home, on Christmas Eve in 1832. He also met Felix Mendelssohn, Carl Maria von Weber and Gioachino Rossini when they each visited London.

== Family ==
His daughter Margaret married William Scrope Ayrton, son of William Ayrton.
