= Georg Forster (composer) =

German editor, composer and physician

Georg Forster (c. 1510 – 12 November 1568) was a German editor, composer and physician.

Forster was born in Amberg, in the Upper Palatinate. While a chorister at Elector Ludwig V's court in Heidelberg around 1521, he was a colleague of Caspar Othmayr, who would also become a composer of renown. Forster received his first instruction in composition from the Kapellmeister Lorenz Lemlin.

Forster wrote and published Frische teutsche Liedlein, a five-part collection of songs. The first volume was published in 1539, and the final volume was published in 1556.

Forster died in Nuremberg.
