= Georg Rhau =

German composer and publisher (1488–1548)

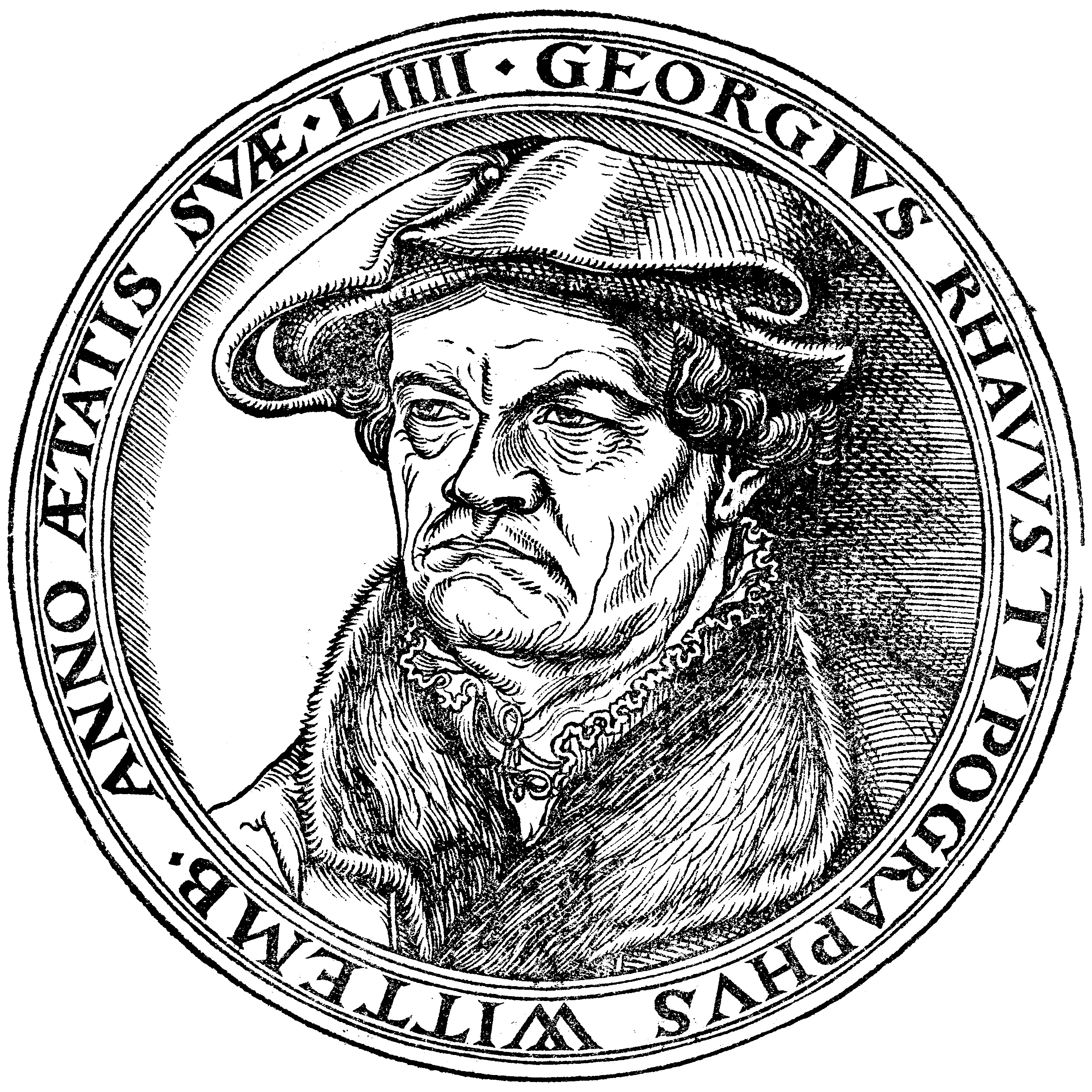
Portrait by Lucas Cranach the Elder, c. 1542

Georg Rhau (Rhaw) (1488 – 6 August 1548) was a German publisher and composer. He was one of the most significant music printers in Germany in the first half of the 16th century, during the early period of the Protestant Reformation. He was principally active in Wittenberg, Saxony, the town where Martin Luther is said to have nailed the Ninety-five Theses to the door of the Castle Church, initiating the Reformation. Rhau's support as a printer was critical to Luther's success.

== Life ==
Born in the Thuringian town of Eisfeld, then part of Ernestine Saxony, Rhau from 1513 onwards studied philosophy at the newly established University of Wittenberg. From 1518 he continued his studies at the University of Leipzig where he also worked as a tutor. He was the cantor of Leipzig Thomanerchor from 1518 to 1520. During Luther's Leipzig Debate, he performed his mass Missa de Sancto Spiritu for twelve voices on 27 June 1519.

In 1520 Rhau had to leave Leipzig, due to his favourable attitude towards the Reformation, and went on to serve as a schoolmaster in the Mansfeld town of Eisleben and in Hildburghausen. From 1522 he worked as a printer in Wittenberg, where he established his own printing shop and publishing house. In 1528, he is again documented as Thomanerchor organist.

Rhau published methodbooks and various significant prints of music by contemporary composers, such as Heinrich Finck, Thomas Stoltzer, Arnold von Bruck, and Ludwig Senfl. His collection is an important document for the development of Lutheran church music.
