= Frische teutsche Liedlein =

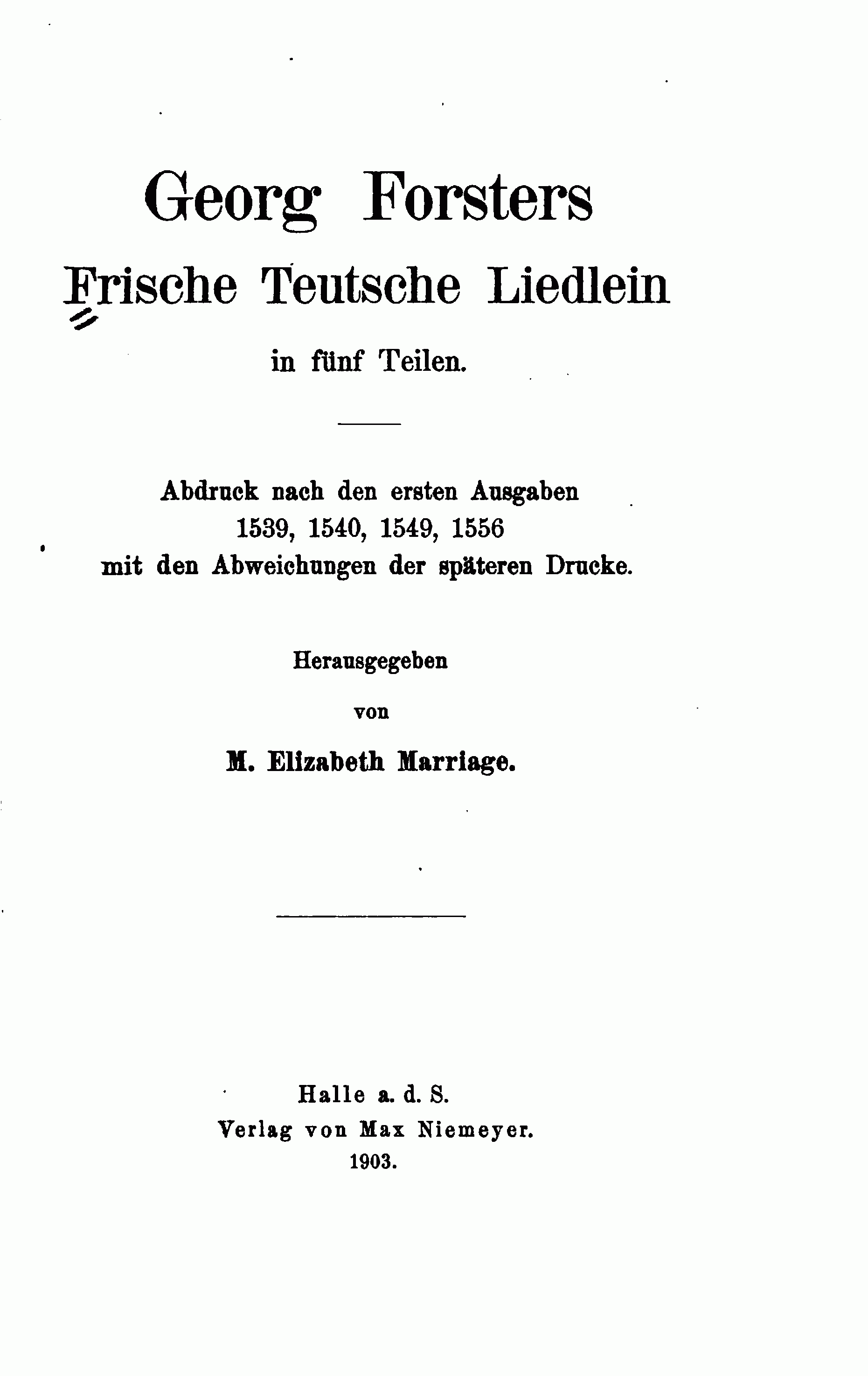

Frische teutsche Liedlein is a five-part collection of songs, which was written and published in 1539-1556 by the doctor, composer and song collector Georg Forster (around 1510 in Amberg – 12 November 1568 in Nuremberg). It comprises 380 polyphonic, predominantly secular German songs. The collection later received its collective name. It is the most extensive and important song publication of the time and one of the most important sources for tenor singers (with the cantus firmus in the tenor, such as a version of Innsbruck, ich muss dich lassen by Heinrich Isaac and Mir ist ein rot Goldfingerlein by Ludwig Senfl).

== Volumes ==
- Ein außzug guter alter und newer Teutscher liedlein/einer rechten Teutschen art/auff allerley Instrumenten zubrauchen/außerlesen. Nürnberg 1539
  (2nd edition 1543; 3rd edition 1549 [title modified]; 4th edition 1552 [title modified]; 5th edition 1560/61)
- Der ander theyl kurtzweiliger guter frischer Teutscher Liedlein zu singen vast lustig. Nürnberg 1540
  (2nd edition 1549 [title modified]; 3rd edition 1553; 4th edition 1565)
- Der dritte theyl schöner lieblicher alter und newer Teutscher Liedlein, nicht alleine zu singen sondern auch auff allerley Instrumenten zu brauchen … und vormals nie gesehen. Nürnberg 1549
  (2nd edition 1552 [title modified]; 3rd edition 1563)
- Der vierdt theyl schöner frölicher frischer alter und newer Teutscher Liedlein mit vier stimmen nicht allein zu singen sondern auch auff allen Instrumenten zu brauchen. Nürnberg 1556
- Der fünfft theyl schöner alter und newer Teutscher liedlein mit fünff stimmen nicht allein zu singen sondern auch auff allen Instrumenten zu brauchen. Nürnberg 1556

== Selection of well-known songs from the collection ==
- Drei Laub auf einer Linden (Jobst von Brandt)
- Entlaubet ist der Walde (Thomas Stoltzer)
- Es liegt ein Schloß in Österreich (Caspar Othmayr)
- Es wollt ein Jäger jagen
- Im Mayen, im Mayen
- Innsbruck, ich muß dich lassen (Heinrich Isaac)
- Mir ist ein feins brauns Maidelein (Caspar Othmayr)
- Unser liebe Fraue vom kalten Brunnen
- Vergangen ist mir Glück und Heil
- Wie schön blüht uns der Maien (Caspar Othmayr)
- Wir zogen in das Feld
- Wo soll ich mich hinkehren
- Wohl auf, gut Gsell, von hinnen (Caspar Othmayr)

== Editions ==
- Kurt Gudewill et al. (ed.): Georg Forster: Frische teutsche Liedlein (1539–1556). (Das Erbe deutscher Musik Volume 20; 60–63). Möseler, Wolfenbüttel 1964–1997.
- M. Elizabeth Marriage (ed.): Georg Forsters Frische Teutsche Liedlein in fünf Teilen. Niemeyer, Halle 1903 (Frische teutsche Liedlein is available for free viewing and download at the Internet Archive).

== Literature ==
- Kurt Gudewill (1961). "Forster, Georg". Neue Deutsche Biographie (in German). Vol. 5. Berlin: Duncker & Humblot. pp. 303–304. (full text online).
