= Klaus-Ernst Behne =

German musicologist

Klaus-Ernst Behne (29 June 1940 – 9 August 2013) was a German professor of musicology with a focus on music psychology.

== Life ==
Born in Uelzen, Behne studied school music, musicology, psychology and physics in Freiburg im Breisgau, Bonn and Hamburg. He belonged to a group of young musicologists around Hans-Peter Reinecke. (1927-2003) - besides Klaus-Ernst Behne also Helga de la Motte-Haber, Ekkehard Jost, Günter Kleinen and Eberhard Kötter. When Reinecke was commissioned in 1964 to set up the department for musical acoustics at the State Institute for Music Research of the Prussian Cultural Heritage Foundation, he took four of the above-mentioned, including Klaus-Ernst Behne (from 1967), with him to West Berlin as research assistants or staff members. There Behne founded the (West) German editorial office of the Répertoire International de Littérature Musicale (RILM).

In 1972, Behne received his doctorate in Hamburg with his empirical study Der Einfluß des Tempos auf die Beurteilung von Musik.

From 1972 until 1975, he was a research assistant at the teacher training college Bielefeld and then for two years professor for systematic musicology at the Detmold Music College. In 1977, he was appointed Germany's first and only professor of music psychology at the Hochschule für Musik, Theater und Medien Hannover, a post he held until 2004. From 1997 to 2003, he was also president of the same university.

In August 2013 Behne died after a long illness in Hannover at the age of 73 and was buried at the cemetery in Schloß Ricklingen. He left behind his wife as well as a son and a daughter.

== Creation ==
Together with Helga de la Motte-Haber and Günter Kleinen, Behne is a co-founder of the German Society for Music Psychology (DGM) and from 1984 was co-editor of the Jahrbuch Musikpsychologie for volumes 1 to 18; he was also chairman of this non-profit association for many years. He previously held this position at the "Arbeitskreis Musikpädagogische Forschung" (AMPF). His research interests were particularly focused on the taste of music, the experience of music and the everyday use of music. His Cross-sectional study Listener Typology, published as a book in 1986, is regarded by many researchers as a milestone in the study of musical preferences and the manifold functions of music in everyday life. Immediately afterwards, from 1991 to 1997, he conducted the only long-term experiment worldwide to date on the development of musical preferences among young people. In 2009, this was published under the title Musikerleben im Jugendalter. Eine Längsschnittstudie published in book form.

He was also interested in the exploration of the special perceptual requirements of contemporary music as well as in musical creativity, synesthesia and audio-visual media music perception. His educational films on the influence of the hearing judgement by the visible performance behaviour of musicians ("musicians on the screen"), in which he used the double procedure, as well as those on the perception of and memory of music in (classical) music videos or on the alteration of pictorial perception through various film scoresversions were evaluated by a multitude of social researches. Studies and theoretical models are accompanied and documented for example in the books Film – Musik – Video oder die Konkurrenz von Auge und Ohr (1987), Gehört – gedacht – gesehen. Zehn Aufsätze zum visuellen, kreativen und theoretischen Umgang mit Musik (1994) and Musik fürs Auge – ein Jahrzehnt Forschung zu (piano-)Musik auf dem Bildschirm (2010).

In 1993, Behne founded the "Institute for Music Education Research" (ifmpf) at the Hochschule für Musik, Theater und Medien Hannover together with his professorial colleagues Franz Amrhein (1935-2012) and Karl-Jürgen Kemmelmeyer (born 1943). (HMTMH), starting with an experimental laboratory for music psychology. In 1994, he was the author of the series of IfMpF research reports which he co-founded. In addition, as the then President of the University, he supported the foundation of the "Instituts für Früh-Förderung musikalisch Hochbegabter" in 2000, and after his retirement, he served on the board of the University's Alumni association.

Colleagues describe Behne as a highly committed, open, but sometimes also overcorrect scientist, but always humorous, lovable person and great philanthropist: His thoroughly humane attitude towards culture and people was to give impulses to people and promote their perception and development, inviting everyone to take responsibility for culture.

As a scholar at a music academy, he was always connected to the lively production of art, was particularly enthusiastic about jazz and musical avant-garde, sometimes sat down at his main instrument, the piano, as documented in his educational films (but there as a double!), was highly productive and original as a photographer and continued to learn a new music instrument after his retirement. Behne organised concerts for and with the "Hannoversche Gesellschaft für Neue Musik" (HGNM) and played a major role in the design of the programme booklets, He was not afraid of mixing the arts or of new forms of performance beyond the traditional concert such as concerts in a completely darkened room (Concert surprise noir), the setting to music of a silent film in several versions (Meshes of the Afternoon] [1943] by Maya Deren) or sound installations (e.g. the sound installation Klang Bewegung Raum by Walter Fähndrich in summer 1990 in the Herrenhäuser Gärten in Hanover). In 1984, he was co-founder of a chamber choir in his long-time place of residence Schloß Ricklingen (Garbsen), and for years he was a voluntary choir director. In addition, he was involved in the construction of a new pipe organ.

His students include Heiner Gembris at that time, currently Professor of Empirical and Psychological Music Pedagogy and Head of the Institute for Giftedness Research in Music at Universität Paderborn, and Josef Kloppenburg, currently Professor of Music and its didactics at the Pädagogische Hochschule Karlsruhe.

== Awards ==
- 2006: Honorary membership of the Deutsche Gesellschaft für Musikpsychologie
- 2010: Culture award of the city of Garbsen

== Publications ==
- Der Einfluß des Tempos auf die Beurteilung von Musik (Diss.). Arno Volk publishing house, Cologne 1972 (Veröffentlichungen des Staatlichen Institutes für Musikforschung Preußischer Kulturbesitz vol. 7)
- Musikalische Sozialisation (ed). Laaber: Laaber-Verlag, 1981 (Musikpädagogische Forschung, 2).
- Klaus-Ernst Behne, Günter Kleinen, Helga de la Motte-Haber (ed.): Musikpsychologie. Jahrbuch der Deutschen Gesellschaft für Musikpsychologie, vol. 1–12, Wilhelmshaven: Noetzel 1984–1995, vol. 13–18, Göttingen: Hogrefe 1998 ff. (from vol. 19 edited by W. Auhagen, C. Bullerjahn & R. von Georgi bzw. C. Louven)
- Hörertypologien – Zur Psychologie des jugendlichen Musikgeschmacks. Gustav Bosse publishing house, Regensburg 1986 (Perspektiven zur Musikpädagogik und Musikwissenschaft vol. 10), ISBN 978-3-7649-2324-2
- Musikerleben im Jugendalter. Eine Längsschnittstudie. Con Brio Verlag, Regensburg 2009, ISBN 978-3-932581-96-0
