= Jobst Fricke =

German university teacher and musicologist (born 1930)

Jobst Peter Fricke (born 5 September 1930) is a German musicologist and professor at the musicological institute of the University of Cologne.

== Life ==
Born in Bielefeld, between 1952 and 1959 Fricke studied physics, musicology, psychology and Communication studies at the University of Göttingen, the University of Berlin and the University of Cologne. In 1959/1960 he obtained his doctorate with his work Über subjektive Differenztöne höchster hörbarer Töne und des angrenzenden Ultraschalls im musikalischen Hören. In 1960/1961 and from 1963 to 1970, he was Wissenschaftlicher Assistent at the Musicological Institute of the University of Cologne, where he had the task of establishing a department for musical acoustics to research the acoustic and psychological foundations of music. In 1969, once habilitated, also in Cologne, Fricke began to work on his thesis Intonation und musikalisches Hören.

Since 1970 Fricke had a professorship at the University of Cologne and was head of the department of musical acoustics which he had founded. Since 1972 he also had a teaching position for acoustics and music psychology at the Hochschule für Musik und Tanz Köln. In 1979/80 he held a substitute professorship at the University of Göttingen.

== Career ==
Fricke was concerned with musical acoustics and systematic musicology. Thus he coined the explanatory model of pulse forming for the emergence of timbre of wind instruments. Based on this model, the electronic wind instruments martinetta (?) and variophon were developed under his aegis at the musicological institute of the University of Cologne.

Other areas of Fricke's work included music communication and the grammar of music. At the same time, he was concerned with a new approach of interdisciplinarity and a rejection of concepts of Absolute music in musicology: "As a human phenomenon, as a means of human expression, expression and communication, the phenomenon of music can ultimately only be understood from the point of view of the characteristics, possibilities and goals of the human being. To work systemically means to look at this complex structure of factors in its dynamic behaviour." Other areas of Fricke's work were the Musikkommunikation and the Grammatik der Musik.

Among his students are Wolfgang Auhagen, Roland Eberlein, Bernd Enders, Matthias Hornschuh, Christoph Reuter, Rudolf Wille and Rosemarie Tüpker.

== Writings ==
- Die Innenstimmung der Naturtonreihe und der Klänge.. In Festschrift für Karl Gustav Fellerer. Regensburg 1962.
- Klangeigenschaften von Clarinen der Capella Colonensins. In Festschrift für H. Hüschen. Köln 1965.
- Moderne Ansätze in Mengolis Hörtheorie. in Festschrift für Karl Gustav Fellerer. Cologne 1973.
- Elektronische Blasinstrumente für Körperbehinderte. In W. Moog (ed.): Blasinstrumente für Behinderte. 1978.
- As editor: Die Sprache der Musik: Festschrift Klaus Wolfgang Niemöller zum 60. Geburtstag. Bosse-Verlag, Regensburg 1989. ISBN 3-7649-2407-1
- With Roland Eberlein: Kadenzwahrnehmung und Kadenzgeschichte: ein Beitrag zu einer Grammatik der Musik. Frankfurt, 1992. ISBN 978-3-631-44962-2
- Intonation und musikalisches Hören. epOs-Music, Osnabrück 2012. ISBN 978-3-940255-14-3

== Literature ==
- Wolfgang Auhagen, Bram Gätjen, Klaus Wolfgang Niemöller (editor): Systemische Musikwissenschaft: Festschrift Jobst Peter Fricke zum 65. Geburtstag. Cologne 2003. (Online)
- Marc Honegger, Günther Massenkeil (ed.): Das große Lexikon der Musik. vol 3: Elsbeth – Haitink. Herder, Freiburg im Breisgau among others 1980, ISBN 3-451-18053-7.
