= Helga de la Motte-Haber =

German woman musicologist

Helga de la Motte-Haber (born 2 October 1938) is a German musicologist focusing on the study of systematic musicology.

== Life ==
Haber was born in Ludwigshafen am Rhein as the first child of Paula Haber, née Kilian, and the physicist and mathematician Gustav Haber. Two brothers followed in 1939 and 1941. She survived the Second World War and the post-war period, according to her own statement, "in the back of the Palatinate" (Winseln, Leutershausen and Frankelbach) - a few kilometres from the French border and the Siegfried Line. She attended school in Kaiserslautern and in Kusel, where she passed her Abitur in 1957. Her father also taught at the grammar school.

In 1957, Haber began studying psychology at the University of Mainz with Albert Wellek, a representative of the Gestalt psychology of the Leipzig School. Her fields of work were music psychology and synaesthesia. In 1959 Haber moved to Vienna, where Hubert Rohracher taught in the tradition of Viennese psychology. After a short excursion to Peter R. Hofstätter at the University of Hamburg, she then took her diploma in psychology with Wellek at the Psychological Institute of the University of Mainz in December 1961.

Four weeks later Haber married to Diether de la Motte, composer and music theorist. After her husband had accepted a call to the Hochschule für Musik und Theater Hamburg, la Motte-Haber continued her studies at the University of Hamburg. There she learned about Peter R. Hofstätter the Privatdozent Hans-Peter Reinecke. (1927-2003). She decided to study musicology and spent a year studying the Klavierspiel.

Reinecke gathered a group of young musicologists around him - besides Helga de la Motte-Haber also Klaus-Ernst Behne, Ekkehard Jost, Günter Kleinen and Eberhard Kötter. When Reinecke was commissioned in 1965 to set up the department for acustic at the State Institute for Music Research, the group went to Berlin together.

La Motte received her doctorate in Hamburg in 1967 with the thesis 'Ein Beitrag zur Klassifikation musikalischer Rhythmen – Eine experimentalpsychologische Untersuchung. At a congress in 1968 she met the musicologist Carl Dahlhaus (1928-1989), who brought her to the Musicological Institute of Technische Universität Berlin in the same year. La Motte taught there for many years. Her extensive publications enabled her to gain cumulative habilitation in 1971, and in 1972 she was appointed to the Pädagogische Hochschule Rheinland. Dahlhaus' efforts to bring her permanently to the Berlin Institute were successful in 1978: la Motte was appointed professor of systematic musicology at the TU Berlin, a position she held until her retirement in 2005.

In 1983 la Motte, who is committed to the promotion of sound art, founded the "Deutsche Gesellschaft für Musikpsychologie" together with Klaus-Ernst Behne and Günter Kleinen.

== Positions ==
Through her more than 300 publications (as of 2014), La Motte-Haber has contributed to the recognition of the subjects systematic musicology and music psychology and since the 1970s has developed their forward-looking new concepts.

=== New orientation ===
In contrast to the relatively artless and elementary conception of the systematic musicology of the 1950s, which was based on aural and music psychology and whose representatives Heinrich Husmann (1908-1983) and Albert Wellek (1904-1972), la Motte-Haber saw the future of the profession as being secured only by a new orientation: The psychoacoustics approaches - such as the determination of absolute threshold of hearing and the consonance degree of intervals - were viewed critically by de la Motte-Haber, since there was no clear correspondence between acoustic reality and musical perception. Thus, from the 1970s onwards, she replaced these older themes with topics such as musical understanding, musical judgment and the way music is dealt with. Her dissertation Ein Beitrag zur Klassifikation musikalischer Rhythmen (1968) showed new methodical ways in the objective recording of music-related judgements. Here the polarity profile, also known as semantic differential, played a central role as a psychological measuring instrument.

=== Understanding music ===
Already in her 1982 article Scope, Method and Goal of Systematic Musicology la Motte-Haber formulated as a new goal of the subject the Understanding of Music Understanding. In place of the search for the "laws that are supreme to the art of music", as still envisaged by Guido Adler in his conception of the subject published in 1885, the relationship between music and listener, which can be changed over time, is now being replaced by a new one. Especially the emotional effects of music becomes a challenge for research. The extended concept of music takes into account the traditional European art music and includes new music and popular music..

La Motte-Haber programmatically formulated the special claim of music psychology as a sub-area of systematic musicology in the spine text of the first Deutsche Gesellschaft für Musikpsychologie (1984), which she co-edited: "Music psychological research deals with problems of access to music. The development of music in our century has thus become a prerequisite for scientific work".

A comprehensive formulation of this new concept can be found in the 1985 "Handbuch der Musikpsychologie" (Handbook of Music Psychology), a book that, by aligning German music psychology with cognitive psychology, brought it into line with the Anglo-American development of psychomusicology. At the same time, however, the specifically German research tradition of music psychology with representatives such as Ernst Kurth and Hermann von Helmholtz was also highlighted. The concept of music psychology presented in this book explains the life and understanding of musicians from different perspectives: This includes the language analogy of music as well as the development of musical preferences, questions of musical talent or interpretation research.

La Motte-Haber made a high-profile contribution to the importance of music psychology as a science relevant to everyday life in the late 1980s with her experiments on the influence of listening to music on driving behaviour. The driving simulator studies on the question of the influence of driving behaviour under the influence of different music styles resulted in a press response that was previously unknown for this subject.

=== Philosophical approach to art ===
Starting in the 1990s, la Motte-Haber developed a further research approach in which the relationship of music to other arts is integratively addressed and a comprehensive philosophy of art (aesthetics) for the 20th and 21st centuries is developed. Externally, this approach is reflected in publication titles such as Music and Visual arts (1990), Music and Religion (1995), Sound Art (1999) and Music and Nature (2000). The central thinking behind these publications is the emphasis on the historical limitations of the concept of a temporal art (for example, music) separated from spatial art (for example, painting), which "crosses borders as a source of meaning in the music of the 20th century Jahrhunderts" (according to the author in the chapter of the same name in the book Music and Religion), the special position of music within the arts since antiquity due to the possibility of delimiting everyday consciousness, or the "de-hierarchization of the arts" in the 20th century as the basis for the emergence of new or superimposed art movements (such as sound art).

=== Music in the 20th century ===
A main focus in the work of la Motte-Haber is contemporary music with special attention to musical currents in which music and visual arts enter into new relationships. These works are based on sensual perception and aesthetic experience as the basis for the description and interpretation of these new artistic developments. La Motte-Haber not only adopts her own approaches from music psychology, but also traces the development in the relationship between the arts, which in the 20th century has revived the old ideal of an integral art appealing to all senses instead of the genre aesthetics. It also helped sound art, whose origins lie in Fluxus and in the installation art of the 1960s, to gain recognition as an independent new musical phenomenon. Important publications in this context were (besides the volume "Klangkunst") the catalogues she also edited for the two Sonambiente exhibitions in Berlin in 1996 and 2006. A proof of her commitment to the musicological study of contemporary music is the volume Geschichte der Musik im 20. Jahrhundert, vol. 4: 1975–2000.

Besides her fundamental work on the development of art in the 20th and 21st century la Motte-Haber was for many years also engaged in the mediation of the musical avant-garde, so she belonged to the editorial board of the magazine Positionen - Beiträge zur Neuen Musik. Her seminar and lecture activities at the conferences of the Darmstadt Institute for New Music and Music Education are devoted to teaching the musical avant-garde in school music lessons.

=== Technical consolidation ===
The last phase of la Motte-Haber's life's work is dedicated to the permanent academic establishment of systematic musicology. The six-volume "Handbuch der Systematischen Musikwissenschaft" (Handbook of Systematic Musicology), conceived and published by her, is the foundation of her professional autonomy from traditional historical musicology. The supporting pillars of the concept are reflected in the titles of the individual volumes: aesthetics of music (as art theory without normative claim), music theory (as a time-spanning foundation of music), music psychology (as a theory of understanding and experiencing music), sociomusicology (as a theory of the social functions of music), and a volume on Acoustic Foundations of Music edited by Stefan Weinzierl. The conception is completed by a Lexikon der Systematischen Musikwissenschaft. The ethnomusicology is not considered as a subfield, since it has meanwhile established itself as an independent field. In the opinion of la Motte-Haber, the subject musicology has "regained its full breadth through the volumes of the Handbuch der Systematischen Musikwissenschaft.

== Prizes and awards ==
- 2002: Prize of honor Deutscher Klangkunst-Preis
- 2006: Honorary member of the Deutsche Gesellschaft für Musikpsychologie
- 2008: Honorary member of the Gesellschaft für Musikforschung
- 2010: Prize of the Margrit Egnér-Stiftung.
- 2015: Honorary doctorate of the Hochschule für Musik, Theater und Medien Hannover

== Publications ==
- Ein Beitrag zur Klassifikation musikalischer Rhythmen. Eine Experimentalpsychologische Untersuchung. Verlag Arno Volk, Cologne 1968.
- Musikpsychologie. Eine Einführung. Verlag Hans Gerig, Cologne 1972, ISBN 3-87252-054-7.
- Das Triviale in Literatur, Musik und bildender Kunst. Klostermann, Frankfurt 1972.
- Psychologie und Musiktheorie. Diesterweg, Frankfurt 1976, ISBN 3-425-03761-7.
- with Hans Emons: Filmmusik. Hanser, Munich 1981, ISBN 978-3-446-13134-7.
- with Carl Dahlhaus: Systematische Musikwissenschaft (Neues Handbuch der Musikwissenschaft, volume 10). Athenaion, Wiesbaden 1982, ISBN 3-7997-0752-2}.
- Handbuch der Musikpsychologie. Laaber-Verlag, Laaber 1985, 3rd edition, expended 2000, ISBN 3-89007-329-8.
- Psychologische Grundlagen des Musiklernens (Handbuch der Musikpädagogik, volume 4). Bärenreiter, Kassel 1987, ISBN 3-7618-0784-8.
- Musik und Bildende Kunst. Laaber-Verlag, Laaber 1990, ISBN 3-89007-196-1.
- with Günther Rötter: Musikhören beim Autofahren. Lang, Frankfurt 1990, ISBN 978-3-7983-1035-3.
- Edgard Varèse. Die Befreiung des Klangs. Wolke, Hofheim 1993, ISBN 3-923997-49-3.
- with Reinhard Kopiez: Der Hörer als Interpret. Lang, Frankfurt 1995, ISBN 3-631-49068-2.
- as editor: Musik und Religion. Laaber-Verlag, Laaber 1995, ISBN 3-89007-265-8.
- Klangkunst (volume 12 of the Handbuch der Musik im 20. Jahrhundert). Laaber-Verlag, Laaber 1999, ISBN 3-89007-432-4.
- Musik und Natur. Naturanschauung und musikalische Poetik. Laaber-Verlag, Laaber 2000, ISBN 978-3-89007-412-2.
- as editor: Geschichte der Musik im 20. Jahrhundert: 1975–2000. Laaber-Verlag, Laaber 2000, ISBN 978-3-89007-424-5
- as editor: Handbuch der Systematischen Musikwissenschaft. 6 volumes. Laaber-Verlag, Laaber 2004–2010, ISBN 978-3-89007-561-7.
  - with Eckhard Tramsen: Musikästhetik. Volume 1, ISBN 978-3-89007-562-4.
  - with Oliver Schwab-Felisch: Musiktheorie. Volume 2, ISBN 978-3-89007-563-1.
  - with Günther Rötter: Musikpsychologie. Volume 3, ISBN 978-3-89007-564-8.
  - with Hans Neuhoff: Musiksoziologie. Volume 4, ISBN 978-3-89007-565-5.
  - Stefan Weinzierl (ed.): Akustische Grundlagen der Musik. Volume 5, ISBN 978-3-89007-699-7.
  - with Heinz von Loesch, Günther Rötter, Christian Utz: Lexikon der Systematischen Musikwissenschaft. Volume 6, ISBN 978-3-89007-566-2.
