= Bernd Enders =

German musicologist (born 1947)

Bernd Enders (born 9 September 1947) is a German musicologist and from 1994 until 2015 a professor for Systematic Musicology at the University of Osnabrück.

== Life ==
Born in Siegen, Enders studied at the Pädagogische Hochschule Westfalen-Lippe and at the Hochschule für Musik und Tanz Köln. He graduated with a state examination in several subjects. In 1980 Enders received his doctorate in musicology, philosophy and pedagogy at the University of Cologne and began his teaching career as Studienrat. Since 1981 he has been a lecturer in musicology at the University of Osnabrück where he received his habilitation in 1986. From 1992 to 1994, Enders was a professor at the Musicological Institute of the University of Cologne (Music in the 20th Century) and since 1994 he has been professor of systematic musicology at the University of Osnabrück (Institut für Musikwissenschaft und Musikpädagogik) with a focus on music electronics and musical computer science.

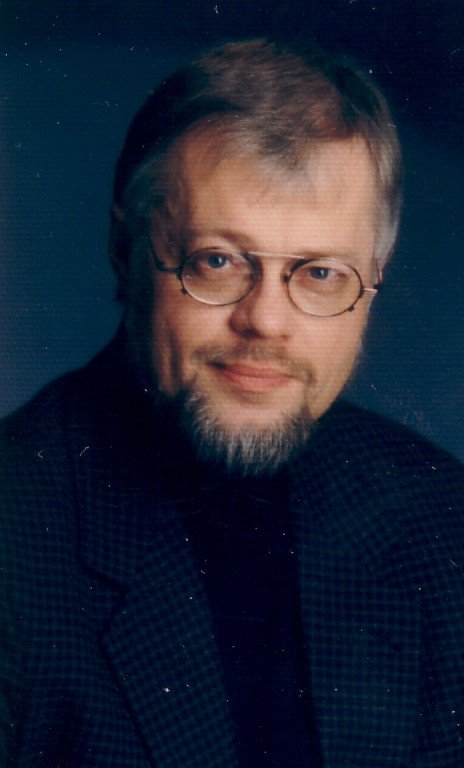
Self portrait

Enders has published books and articles, particularly on scientific, cultural and educational issues related to music technology, multimedia and music informatics. He organized and directed international conferences on these topics, was program director of the Osnabrück KlangArt, held lectures and designed radio broadcasts. He is the head of the eLearning project CAMI, which since 1986 has been involved in the development and publication of the internationally distributed music learning programme "Computerkolleg Musik", which was awarded the 2000 Comenius-EduMedia-Award by the Gesellschaft für Pädagogik und Information (GPI). He is also the initiator and managing director of the Research Centre for Music and Media Technology (FMT) at the University of Osnabrück, founded in 1997, and founder and co-editor of the musicological online publishing house epOs-Music. Until 2018 he was a board member of the institute virtUOS (Centre for the Support of Virtual Teaching at the University of Osnabrück) since its foundation in 2002 and in 2009 he had a guest professorship at the musicological institute of the Karl-Franzens-University Graz. From 2012 to 2014 he was chairman of the Osnabrücker Wissenschaftliche Gesellschaft (OWiG) and director of the Institute for Musicology and Music Education (IMM) at the University of Osnabrück.

== Publications ==
- Studien zur Durchhörbarkeit und Intonationsbeurteilung von Akkorden. Regensburg 1981. (Kölner Beiträge zur Musikforschung vol. 115) (Diss., Akustische Reihe vol. 8).
- Die Klangwelt des Musiksynthesizers. Munich 1985 (republished by epOs-Music with complete online version).
- Lexikon Musikelektronik. Schott/Goldmann, Mainz/München 1985, ISBN 3-442-33600-7. (Dt. Verlag für Musik, Leipzig 1988, ISBN 3-370-00280-9; Schott/Piper, Mainz/Munich 1985, ISBN 3-442-33600-7; 3rd extended and revised edition. Atlantis-Musikbuch-Verlag, Mainz 1997, ISBN 3-254-08352-0)
- Bernd Enders, Tillman Weyde: Computerkolleg Musik - Gehörbildung, Kurse 1 - 6. Revised and extended version for Windows. Schott Music Software, Mainz u. a. 1990, ISBN 3-7957-0213-5.
  - engl. Version: Computer courses in music - ear training. Schott Musik International, Mainz 2002, ISBN 3-7957-6081-X.
- Bernd Enders (ed.): Neue Musiktechnologie II - KlangArt-Kongress '93 - Vorträge und Berichte, B. Schott's Söhne, Mainz 1996.
- Bernd Enders, Joachim Stange-Elbe (ed.): „Global village - global brain – global music“. KlangArt-Kongreß '99 - Vorträge und Berichte. epOs-Music, Osnabrück 2003.
- Bernd Enders (ed.): Mathematische Musik - musikalische Mathematik. Pfau, Saarbrücken 2005.
- Der wohltemperierte Musikcomputer. In A. Albrecht, G. v. Essen, W. Frick (ed): Zahlen, Zeichen und Figuren - Mathematische Inspirationen in Kunst und Literatur. de Gruyter, Berlin/ Boston 2011, ISBN 978-3-11-022905-9, pp. 47–80.
- Bernd Enders, Jürgen Oberschmidt, Gerhard Schmitt (ed.): Die Metapher als ›Medium‹ des Musikverstehens. epOs-Music, Osnabrück 2013.
- Bernd Enders: Analoge und digitale Syntheseverfahren, MIDI und Sampling. In Musikalische Akustik, ed. by Christoph Reuter und Wolfgang Auhagen, Laaber 2014, ISBN 978-3-89007-736-9, p. 262–301
- From Idiophone to Touchpad. The Technological Development to the Virtual Musical Instrument. in the 21st Century. Identities, Configurations, Practices. Ed. by Till Bovermann, Alberto de Campo, Hauke Egermann, Sarah-Indriyati Hardjowirogo, Stefan Weinzierl. Springer, Singapore 2017, ISBN 978-981-10-2950-9, pp. 45–58.

== Literature ==
- Arne Bense, Martin Gieseking, Bernhard Müßgens: Musik im Spektrum technologischer Entwicklungen und Neuer Medien. Festschrift für Bernd Enders. epOs-Music, Osnabrück 2015, ISBN 978-3-940255-60-0.
