= Rudolph Angermüller =

German musicologist and music historian

- Born: Rudolph Kurt Angermüller; 2 September 1940; Gadderbaum, North Rhine-Westphalia
- Died: 15 July 2021 (aged 80); Neumarkt am Wallersee, Austria
- Education: Johannes Gutenberg-Universität Mainz; Westfälische Wilhelms-Universität; University of Salzburg
- Occupations: Musicologist; Academic teacher
- Organizations: Neue Mozart-Ausgabe; International Mozarteum Foundation

Rudolph Kurt Angermüller (2 September 1940 – 15 July 2021) was a German musicologist, who rendered great services to Mozart studies in particular.

== Life ==
Born in Gadderbaum near Bielefeld, Angermüller took classes in piano, double bass and music theory at the Fösterling-Konservatorium in Bielefeld. He obtained his Abitur in 1961. From 1961 to 1970 he studied musicology, Romance studies and history at the Johannes Gutenberg-Universität Mainz, the Westfälische Wilhelms-Universität in Münster, and the University of Salzburg, with Arnold Schmitz, Günther Massenkeil, Hellmut Federhofer and Gerhard Croll. From 1968 to 1975, he was a lecturer of musicology at the University of Salzburg. In 1970 he received his doctorate at the University of Salzburg with a thesis on Antonio Salieri, focused on his secular works, especially his operas.

Angermüller worked on the Neue Mozart-Ausgabe, a complete edition of the composer's works, from 1973 to 1981. He then became head of the scientific department of the International Mozarteum Foundation, and in 1988 the Foundation's General Secretary. In 1991, he was the scientific head of a Salzburg exhibition of Mozart, entitled Bilder und Klänge.

Since 1996, Angermüller has been a corresponding member of the Accademia Roveretana degli Agiati, among several academies and Mozart associations.

Angermüller died on 15 July 2021 in Neumarkt am Wallersee, Austria, at age 80.

== Work ==
Angermüller wrote a book about Mozart's travels, looking at 3,720 days and their locations and meetings in geographical, historic and social context. He worked on it over 20 years. He has been one of four editors of the Mozart Bibliography. He also wrote liner notes and program notes for the Salzburg Festival and recordings of Mozart's works.

Angermüller's works are held by the German National Library, including:

- Antonio Salieri. Sein Leben und seine weltlichen Werke unter besonderer Berücksichtigung seiner "großen" Opern. In drei Teilbände. Musikverlag Katzbichler, Munich 1971–1974, Dissertation at the University of Salzburg.
  - Teil I: Werk- und Quellenverzeichnis, 1971, ISBN 3-87397-016-3 (Publikationen des Instituts für Musikwissenschaft der Universität Salzburg. Volume 2, as well as Schriften zur Musik. volume 16).
  - Teil II, 1: Vita und weltliche Werke, 1974, ISBN 3-87397-019-8 (Publikationen des Instituts für Musikwissenschaft der Universität Salzburg. Volume 3, Schriften zur Musik. Volume 17).
  - Teil III: Dokumente, 1972, ISBN 3-87397-021-X} (Publikationen des Instituts für Musikwissenschaft der Universität Salzburg. volume 4, Schriften zur Musik. volume 19).
- Vom Kaiser zum Sklaven: Personen in Mozarts Opern; mit bibliographischen Notizen über die Mozart-Sänger der Uraufführungen und Mozarts Librettisten. Internationale Stiftung Mozarteum, Salzburg / Bayerische Vereinsbank, Munich 1989.
- Antonio Salieri. Dokumente seines Lebens unter Berücksichtigung von Musik, Literatur, Bildender Kunst, Architektur, Religion, Philosophie, Erziehung, Geschichte, Wissenschaft, Technik, Wirtschaft und täglichem Leben seiner Zeit. 3 volumes. Volume 1: 1670 – 1786, volume 2: 1787 – 1807, volume 3: 1808 – 2000. Karl Heinrich Bock, Bad Honnef 2000, ISBN 3-87066-495-9, (German, Italian, French).
- Ich, Johannes Chrisostomus Amadeus Wolfgangus Sigismundus Mozart. "Eine Autobiografie". Karl Heinrich Bock, Bad Honnef 1991, ISBN 3-87066-234-4.
- Mozarts Reisen in Europa. 1762–1791. Karl Heinrich Bock, Bad Honnef 2004, ISBN 3-87066-913-6.
- Mozart 1485/86 bis 2003. Daten zu Leben, Werk und Rezeptionsgeschichte der Mozarts. 2 volumes. Musikverlag Hans Schneider, Tutzing 2004, ISBN 3-7952-1159-X.
- Florilegium Pratense. Mozart, seine Zeit, seine Nachwelt. Ausgewählte Aufsätze von Rudolph Angermüller anläßlich seines 65. Geburtstages. Herausgegeben von Geneviève Geffray und Johanna Senigl. Königshausen & Neumann, Würzburg 2005, ISBN 3-8260-3258-6.
- Mozart muss sterben. Ein Prozess(Belletristische Darstellung). Ecowin Verlag der Topakademie, Salzburg 2005, ISBN 3-902404-17-5.
- Das Testament des Salzburger Bürgermeisters Ignatz Anton von Weiser (1701–1785), Mozarts Textdichter. In Mitteilungen der Gesellschaft für Salzburger Landeskunde. Volume 145, 2005, ISSN 0435-8279, pp. 67–92.
- Wenzel Müller und "sein" Leopoldstädter Theater. Mit besonderer Berücksichtigung der Tagebücher Wenzel Müllers, Böhlau, Vienna / Cologne / Weimar 2009, ISBN 978-3-205-78448-7 (Wiener Schriften zur Stilkunde und Aufführungspraxis, volume 5), Text at Google Books.
