= Hans Joachim Marx =

German musicologist and music historian

Hans Joachim Marx (born 16 December 1935) is a German music historian. He has been professor of European music history at the University of Hamburg.

== Life ==
Born in Leipzig, Marx first studied music at the Academy of Music in Leipzig. In 1956 he escaped from East Germany to Freiburg im Breisgau in West Germany. After 1958 he studied musicology, German literature and philosophy at the Universities of Freiburg and Basel. In 1966 he obtained his doctorate in Basel under Arnold Schmitz with a dissertation on "The Organ Tablature of Clemens Hör". In the following years, sponsored by the Swiss National Science Foundation, he spent time researching and compiling sources for a complete edition of the works of Arcangelo Corelli. In 1966–1967 he was a lecturer at the University of Zurich, and from 1968 to 1972 he was assistant to Günther Massenkeil in Bonn. In the summer of 1972 he received his habilitation in musicology: in 1973 he became professor of European music history at the University of Hamburg where he remained until his retirement in 2001.

Marx's main areas of research have been on Renaissance instrumental music and Baroque music, in particular the works of George Frideric Handel to which he has many contributions. He is co-editor of the work editions of Corelli, Hasse and Handel, editor of the Göttinger Händel-Beiträge, which he founded in 1984, and of the six-volume Händel-Handbook (2008-2012). He is also co-editor of various musicological series (among others Abhandlungen zur Musikgeschichte, Vandenhoeck & Ruprecht, Göttingen, Beiträge zur Geschichte der Kirchenmusik, Verlag Ferdinand Schöningh, Paderborn) and the Hamburger Mendelssohn-Vorträge, Verlag Christians, Hamburg.

Marx is a corresponding member of the Akademie der Wissenschaften zu Göttingen, full emeritus member of the Academy of Sciences and Humanities in Hamburg and Member of the Institute of Advanced Musical Studies of King's College London. Between 2004 and 2014 he was chairman of the board of the Göttingen International Handel Festival Foundation. Since 2001 he has been an honorary member of the Göttingen Händel-Gesellschaft.

== Publications since 2001 ==
=== Monographs ===
- Händel und seine Zeitgenossen. Eine biographische Enzyklopädie, 2 parts volume (Das Händel-Handbuch vol. 1), Laaber 2008
- Händel und die geistliche Musik des Barockzeitalters. Eine Aufsatzsammlung, Laaber 2013
- Die G. F. Händel zugeschriebenen Kompositionen, 1700-1800 / The compositions attributed to G. F. Handel, 1700-1800.(HWV Anh. B), with Steffen Voss, Hildesheim/Zürich/New York 2016

=== Articles ===
- A newly discovered Gloria by Handel, in Early music 29 (2001), 342–352 (auf Deutsch in Göttinger Händel-Beiträge 9 (2002), 37–53, auf Japanisch in Ongakugaku. Journal of the Musicological Society of Japan 47 (2001), 127–139)
- Bemerkungen zu szenischen Aufführungen barocker Oratorien und Serenaten, in Basler Jahrbuch für Historische Musikpraxis 23 (2001), 133–150
- Die Händel zugeschriebenen Kompositionen in den thematischen Katalogen von Breitkopf (1762-1768), mit Steffen Voss, in Göttinger Händel-Beiträge 9 (2002), 149–160
- Das Händelbild Chrysanders, in the Händel-Jahrbuch 48 (2002), 35–44
- Unbekannte Basler Tabulaturfragmente aus dem frühen 16. Jahrhundert, in U. Konrad, J. Heidrich, H. J. Marx (ed.), Musikalische Quellen – Quellen der Musik. Festschrift für Martin Staehelin zum 65. Geburtstag, Göttingen 2002, 37–50
- Geschichte einer ungewöhnlichen Komposition: Georg Friedrich Händels Masque Acis and Galatea, in: H. Krellmann (ed.)., Der moderne Komponist baut auf der Wahrheit. Opern des Barock von Monteverdi bis Mozart, Stuttgart/Weimar 2003, 87–95
- Unbekannte Kantaten von Händel, A. Scarlatti, Fago und Grillo in einer neapolitanischen Handschrift von 1710, mit Steffen Voss, in B. M. Antonlini et al. (ed.), Et facciam dolci canti. Studi in onore di Agostino Ziino in occassione del suo 65° compleanno, Lucca 2003, 797–806
- Felix Mendelssohn Bartholdy und England, in: H. J. Marx (ed.), Hamburger Mendelssohn-Vorträge, Hamburg 2003, 81–98
- Eine neue Quelle zu Händels Oper 'Rodrigo' , mit Steffen Voss, in Göttinger Händel-Beiträge 10 (2004), 67–80
- Bericht über das Gesprächskonzert: Finderglück. eine neue Kantate von J. S. Bach? von G. F. Händel? - Meine Seele soll Gott loben (BWV 223), in Göttinger Händel-Beiträge 10 (2004), 179–204
- Festinszenierungen römischer Oratorien und Serenaten im Barockzeitalter, in Analecta musicologica 33 (2004), 335–372
- Die Händel zugeschriebenen Kompositionen I (Arien und Lieder HWV Anh. B 001-032). With Steffen Voss, in Göttinger Händel-Beiträge 11 (2006), 95–124.
- Händels Lehrjahre an der Gänsemarkt-Oper in Hamburg unter Reinhard Keiser (1703-1705), in Veröffentlichungen der Internationalen Händel-Akademie Karlsruhe 8 (2006), 343–359 (auf Englisch in R. G. King (ed.), Handel Studies. A Gedenkschrift for Howard Serwer [Festschrift Series 22], Hillsdale, NY, 2009, 25–45)
- Zur Überlieferung der Te Deum-Kompositionen von Johann Adolf Hasse, in R. Wiesend (ed.), Johann Adolf Hasse in seiner Zeit. Stuttgart 2006, 251–259
- Johannes Brahms im Briefwechsel mit Friedrich Chrysander, in W. Sandberger et al. (ed.), Musik und Musikforschung. Johannes Brahms im Dialog mit der Geschichte, Kassel 2007, 221–274
- Zur Einführung in das Symposium 'Händel in der Wiener Klassik' , in Göttinger Händel-Beiträge 12 (2008), 51–55
- Die Händel zugeschriebenen Komposition II (Duette und Solo-Kantaten HWV Anh. B 101-134), mit Steffen Voss, in: Göttinger Händel-Beiträge 12 (2008), 123–162
- Händel als Briefschreiber, in Die Musikforschung 62 (2009), 111–127
- Annäherung an Händel, in Die Tonkunst 3 (2009), 329–338
- Händels Religiosität im Kontext der europäischen Konfessionen, in Händel-Jahrbuch 56 (2010), 79–99
- Die Händel zugeschriebenen Kompositionen III (Oratorische Werke und Kirchenmusik, HWV Anh. B 201-219), in Göttinger Händel-Beiträge 13 (2010), 165–192
- Händels lateinische Motette ‚Silete venti‘ (HWV 242)- ein Auftragswerk für Paris?, in: A. Beer et al. (ed.), Festschrift Hellmut Federhofer zum 100. Geburtstag, Tutzing 2011, 267–280
- Concerti a due cori (HWV 332-335), in S. Rampe (ed.), Händels Instrumentalmusik (Das Händel-Handbuch 5), Laaber 2011, 486–496
- Die Händel zugeschriebenen Kompositionen IV (Orchesterwerke HWV Anh. B 301-368), wth Steffen Voss, in Göttinger Händel-Beiträge 14 (2012), 167–213
- ‚Ein begeisterter Kreis von Künstlern und Kunstfreunden‘ - Achtzig Jahre Göttinger Händel-Gesellschaft, in Programmbuch der Göttinger Händel-Festspiele 2013
- Die Musik am Hof von Georg III. (1761-1820), in Göttinger Händel-Beiträge 15 (2014), 119–143
- A love of music distraction…. Musik im Leben der englischen Königin Charlotte (1744-1818), in Archiv für Musikwissenschaft 71 (2014), 1–20
- … ein jüngerer Gelehrter von Rang. Leo Schrades frühe Jahre bis zur Emigration in die USA (1938), in Die Musikforschung 67 (2014), 251–269
- Zum Gedenken an Günther Massenkeil (1926-2014), in Die Musikforschung 68 (2015), 122
- Altes im neuen Werk. Leo Schrades Diskurs mit Paul Hindemith, in Archiv für Musikwissenschaft 72 (2015), 146–157
- Zur Echtheit des Händel-Porträts von Christoph Platzer (um 1710), in Göttinger Händel-Beiträge 17 (2016), 97–109

=== Editions ===
- Händel. Gloria HWV deest. Urtext der Hallischen Händel-ausgabe (Vorabdruck), Kassel 2001
- New Mattheson studies mit George Buelow, Cambridge University Press, 2. Aufl. 2006
- An International Handel Bibliography / Internationale Händel-Bibliographie (1959-2009), Göttingen 2009
- Georg Friedrich Händel. Dixit Doiminus (Psalm 109) HWV 232. Neuausgabe (Hallische Händel-Ausgabe III,1), Kassel 2012
- Bibliographie der Internationalen Händel-Literatur in Göttinger Händel-Beiträge 9 (2002)ff.

=== Lexikon articles ===
Several articles in:

- Die Musik in Geschichte und Gegenwart. General Encyclopedia of Music, founded by Friedrich Blume. Second, revised edition edited by Ludwig Finscher, Kassel, personalities part vol. 6, 2001 [Matteo Fornari], vol. 8, 2002 [Georg Friedrich Händel] and vol. 14, 2005 Arnold Schmitz
- Das Händel-Lexikon, edited by Hans Joachim Marx in cooperation with Manuel Gervink and Steffen Voss (Das Händel-Handbuch 6), Laaber 2011 [several articles on Handel researchers, patrons, members of the English royal family, Handel places and singers, correspondence, family and relatives, Halleluja (Alleluja), Handel's personality and travels]
