= Josef Kloppenburg =

German musicologist

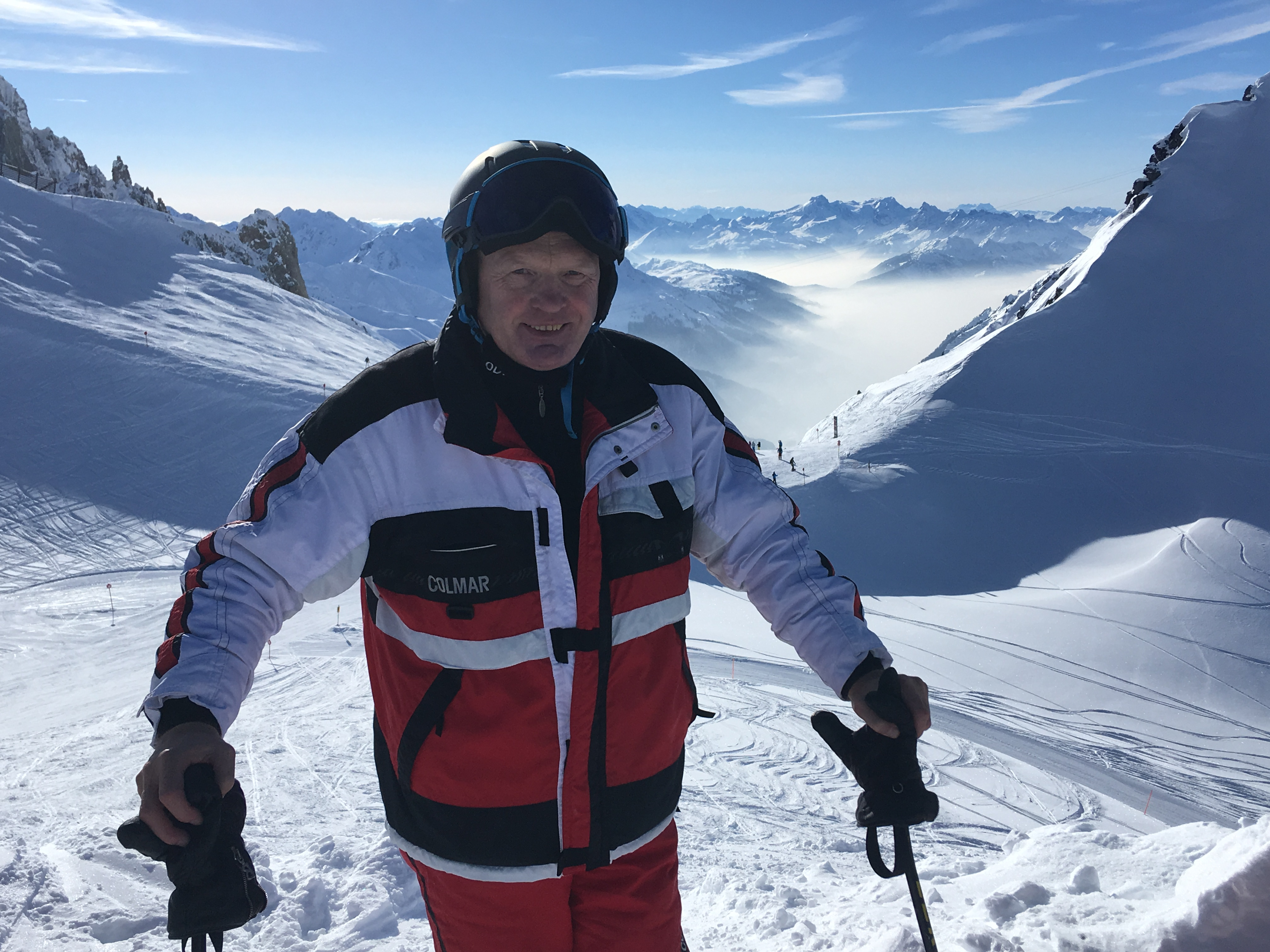
Josef Kloppenburg (2018)

Josef Kloppenburg (born 27 September 1954) is a German musicologist and music educator.

== Life ==
Born in Paderborn, Kloppenburg was a choirboy and soloist (responsorial singer) in the Paderborn Cathedral Choir, passed his Abitur in 1973 at the Staatliches Altsprachliches Gymnasium Theodorianum Paderborn and, after his civil service, studied at the Staatliche Hochschule für Musik Detmold from 1975. School music. He continued his school music studies at the Hochschule der Künste Berlin and studied musicology at the Technische Universität Berlin as well as sports at the Freie Universität Berlin. He passed the school music exam in 1979, the first state exam in 1982 and the second state exam in 1988 for the teaching profession at grammar schools, both with the grade "good". Kloppenburg received his doctorate from Technische Universität Berlin in 1985 with a dissertation on film scores in films by Alfred Hitchcock with a grade of very good (first report: Helga de la Motte-Haber, second report: Carl Dahlhaus). He stayed in Berlin, and from 1980 to 1982, he was a music teacher at the Freiherr-vom-Stein Oberschule in Spandau. From 1982 to 1986 he worked as a research assistant at the Technical University of Braunschweig (H. Segler). He was also an assistant to Herbert von Karajan in 1983/84. From 1986 to 1988, he was a student teacher in Berlin, and from 1988 to 1994, he taught as a student councilor at the Fritz-Karsen-Gesamtschule in Neukölln. At the same time, he was a lecturer at the Berlin University of the Arts, at the University of Greifswald and at the Technical University of Braunschweig, where he habilitated in 2001 with a thesis on educational music as an aesthetic concept. In 1994, he accepted the offer of a professorship for music at the Karlsruhe University of Education. From 1999 to 2004, he was head of the Academic Examination Office at the Karlsruhe University of Education. He is a consultant for the Deutsche Forschungsgemeinschaft and the evaluation agency Acquin. In 2016/2017, Kloppenburg was president of the Rotary Club Karlsruhe.

== Research ==
Kloppenburg is the publisher and author of the handbook "Musik multimedial. Filmmusik, Videoclip, Fernsehen" (Handbuch der Musik des zwanzigsten Jahrhunderts, vol. 11). This book was awarded the 2001 German Music Edition Prize in the category musicological books. In addition to composition techniques and film aesthetics, cultural and social processes of production, reception and reflection of multi-media music, including the traditional methods of musicology, are inevitably moving into the centre of research with regard to music and multimedia. For the volume "Musikpsychologie" of the five-volume Handbuch der Systematischen Musikwissenschaft, vol.3 edited by Helga de la Motte-Haber and Günther Rötter, he wrote the article "Musikpräferenzen. Einstellungen, Vorurteile, Einstellungsänderung" (2005). In 2012, he published Das Handbuch der Filmmusik. He worked on the state of research on educational music by Hindemith, de la Motte, Orff, Schnebel among others in the context of utility music and placed these compositions in the theoretical framework of the school ("Pädagogische Musik als ästhetisches Konzept" Augsburg 2002). Kloppenburg also explores the significance of music in the background when playing video games with regard to music pedagogical consequences.
