= Kleinen (surname) =

Kleinen is a German surname, either a patronymic surname from "Klein" ("small") derived with the genitive suffix '-en' or a toponymic surname derived from Kleinen. Notable people with the surname include:

- Günter Kleinen, German musicologist
- Marko Kleinen (born 2001), Dutch footballer
