= Shrillness =

Annoying, high-pitched, strident, raucous, screeching or harsh sound

Shrillness is the quality of sounds that have a high-pitched, strident, raucous, screeching or harsh character, such as those produced by a trumpet or piccolo. Some such sounds, in a widely recognised and puzzling phenomenon, are perceived as psychologically painful or aversive to a degree that cannot be accounted for simply in terms of frequency content or loudness. Such sounds include the sound of fingernails scraping a chalkboard, the sound of chalk on a blackboard, the sound of glass being scratched, and possibly the sound of a baby crying. There have been attempts to explain the phenomenon, often in terms of frequency content, or evolutionary advantage, but so far no complete explanation or mechanism has been found.

== Research ==
A 2011 study by musicologists Michael Oehler and Christoph Reuter has led its authors to hypothesize that the unpleasantness of the sound is caused by acoustic resonance, as the shape of the human ear canal amplifies certain frequencies, especially those in the range of 2000 to 4000 Hz (the median pitches), at such a level that the sound triggers pain in our ears.

Research on 13 experimental subjects at Newcastle University, reported in the Journal of Neuroscience, has shown that certain sounds produced a strong activation of the amygdala, a region of the brain involved in fear and emotion. The sound of a knife on a glass bottle was rated the most unpleasant, followed by a fork on a glass, then chalk on a blackboard, a ruler on a bottle, and fingernails on a blackboard, respectively.

A student project carried out on the internet at the University of Salford and reported on BBC Radio 4 asked people to rate a range of recorded sounds, although the rating was in terms of "disgustingness" and included sounds like vomiting, which cannot be considered shrill.
