= John Palmer (composer) =

British composer, pianist, musicologist and university professor

John Palmer (born 1959) is a British composer, pianist, musicologist and university professor. His compositions are published by Composers Edition.

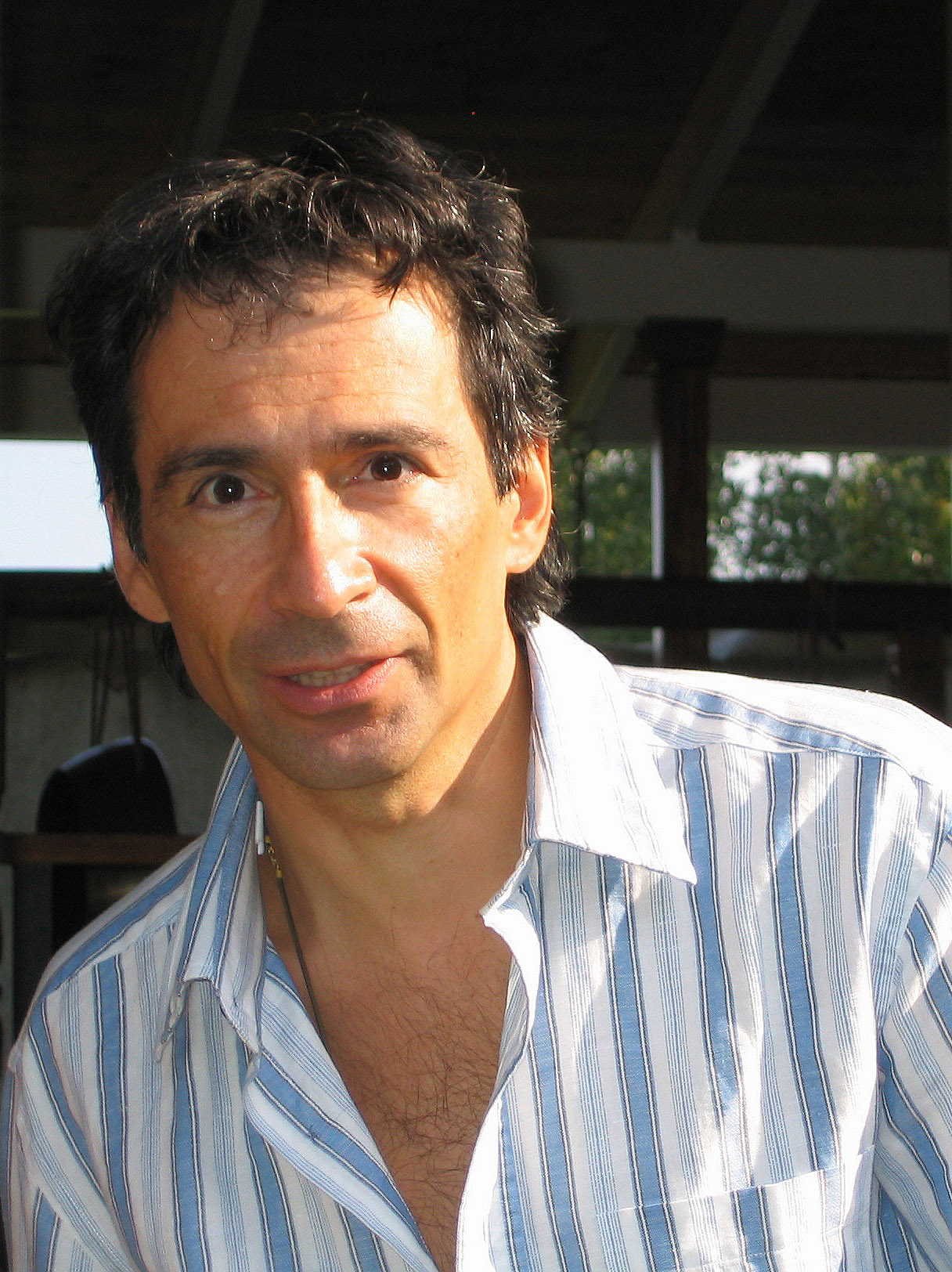
John Palmer

== Life ==
John Palmer began his music career as a pianist in the mid-seventies. In the 1980s he continued his piano studies with Grazia Wendling and Eva Serman at the Lucerne School of Music (Musikhochschule Luzern), where he also studied composition with Edison Denisov and Vinko Globokar. He continued his composition studies in London at Trinity College of Music, Royal Holloway, University of London and at City University London where he obtained a PhD titled "Formal Strategies in Composition" in 1994. Further studies include composition with Vinko Globokar at the Dartington Summer School and privately with Jonathan Harvey, Analysis with Jonathan Cross at the University of Bristol, and Conducting with Alan Hazeldine at the Guildhall School of Music And Drama in London. Since 1987 Palmer has written more than 130 compositions for opera, music theatre, orchestral, instrumental, vocal, chamber music, and electroacoustic music. Several of Palmer’s early compositions have been archived in the British Music Collection, a national database of British composers established in the 20th century. Palmer has taught at the University of Oxford, Department of External Studies (1990-1995, The University of Hertfordshire (1995-2000) and was Professor of Listening Education at the State University of Music and Performing Arts Stuttgart from 2000 to 2026.

== Music ==
In the 1980s, the music of John Cage and free-jazz influenced the aleatoric aesthetic of Palmer’s early chamber works, an approach which he later rejected. In the early 1990s, Palmer delved into the European avant-garde and electroacoustic music, two directions that will have a profound impact on his future musical output. By the end of the 1980s Palmer developed a distinctive musical language including techniques of spectral music and a sensitivity for sonic spaces often articulated on the threshold of silence. Many of his works from this period bear references to Eastern cultures, such as Zen, (Koan (1999), Satori (1999), Still (2001), and Waka (2003)) and Tibetan Buddhism (Hinayana (1999), Shambhala (1993)). However, the meditative nature of this influences often intertwines with the virtuosity of 20th-century European modernism, characterising a kind of lyricism that reflects a strong search for communication. This feature is apparent in many instrumental and chamber music works, such as the Second String Quartet (1997), Transitions (2000), Over (2006), Transparence (2015), and the opera Re di Donne (2019) where instrumental virtuosity is reinforced by electronics. The fusion of acousmatic music and instrumental virtuosity can be heard in works like Epitaph (1997), Encounter (1998), Transfiguration (2006), Transient (2008), Thereafter (2013), Transparence (2015).

== Selected works ==
=== Opera ===
- Re di Donne (2019) Chamber Opera in One Act, for 4 singers and ensemble with electronics

=== Orchestra ===
- Omen (1991) for orchestra and choir
- There (1992, rev. 2019) for string orchestra with string quartet
- Concertino (1994)
- Hypothetical Questions (1992 rev. 2011)
- Piano Concerto (2005) for piano (tuned microtonally), orchestra and choir
- Double Concerto for Violin and Cello (2016)
- Not Two (2017) for orchestra

=== Ensemble ===
- Asgard (1987- rev. 2001) for 2 speakers and ensemble (fl, cl, vl, vla, vc, pno, electronics)
- Koan (1999) for shakuhachi and ensemble (fl, ob, clar, perc, pno, vl, vla, vc)
- Waka (2003) for percussion and ensemble (fl, ob, cl, pno, vl, vla, vc)
- Legend (2008) for harp and ensemble
- You (2008) for trombone and ensemble
- Transparence (2015) for viola and ensemble with electronics
- Blurring definitions (2016) fl, cl, bs, perc, 2 vl, vla, vc, db

=== Music Theatre ===
- Utopia (1989-rev. 2019) for mezzosoprano, wind quartet and electronics

=== Chamber music ===
- First String Quartet (1986)
- Hellawes (1991) flute trio
- Theorem (1995) violin, cello, piano
- Second String Quartet (1996)
- Encounter (1998) harpsichord, world percussion, electronics
- Between (2000) violin and harpsichord
- Transitions (2000) violin, clarinet, cello, piano
- Still (2001) bass flute, 6 & 12-string guitar, viola
- Nowhere (2003) clarinet, piano, electronics
- Afterglow (2006) alto flute, piano, electronics
- Transference (2010) flute, clarinet, violin, cello and piano
- Crossing dialogues (2013) violin, cello, vibraphone and piano
- Of Shadows Unveiled (2013) flute, bass clarinet and piano
- Towards the soul (2015) trombone quartet
- Conditional action (2016) two flutes
- Alba (2016) violin, viola, cello, piano
- Transgression (2011, rev. 2023) solo cello, violin, flute, piano

=== Instrumental ===
- Hieroglyphs (1985–86) piano
- Three Preludes (1987) piano
- Poem for the Absurd (1987) piano
- Musica Reservata (1989) piano
- Shambhala (1990) piano
- Satori (1999) harpsichord
- Hinayana (1999) oboe
- Mosaic (1998) harpsichord
- Drang (1999) accordion
- Without (2004) violin
- Almost (2006) cello
- Over (2006) violin
- En avant (2006) piano
- Se potessi (2011) piano
- Eulogy (2013) piano
- Verso l’alto (2014) viola
- Three Haikus (2014) shakuhachi
- Hypothesis (2017) percussion
- Yahari (2017) guitar
- Lux Vivens (2022) cello
- Lux Ardens (2023) cello
- Lux Serena (2024) cello
- Lux Obscura (2025) cello
- Akasha (2025) harpsichord and Ebows

=== Electroacoustic (including acousmatic) ===
- Beyond the bridge (1993) cello and electronics
- Renge-kyo (1993) piano and electronics
- Encounter (1998) harpsichord, world percussions, electronics
- ...as it flies... (2001) tape
- Transfiguration (1999–2006) trombone and electronics
- I am (2002) tape
- After silence 1 (2005) piano and electronics
- Inwards (2005–06) bass flute and electronics
- In the Temple (2006–07) tape
- Present Otherness (2008) tape
- Mémoires (2011) tape
- Woanders (2016) piano and electronics

== Awards ==
- 1990 - Cornelius Cardew Competition, England: special mention for In memory of a friend, for soprano and piano.
- 1992 - City of Lucerne Cultural Prize, Switzerland: first prize winner with Omen, for orchestra and choir.
- 1994 - Bourges International Competition for Electroacoustic Music, France: second prize winner with Beyond the Bridge, for cello & electronics.
- 1995 - Surrey Sinfonietta Orchestral Competition Contest, England: first prize winner with Concertino, for orchestra.
- 1995 - 1st Tokyo International Competition for Chamber Music Composition: second prize winner with Theorem (piano trio).
- 1996 - City of Klagenfurt International Composition Prize, Austria: second prize winner with Second String Quartet.
- 2009 - Bourges International Competition for Electroacoustic Music, France: selection of Transient for soprano, prepared piano & electronics.
- 2010 - Città di Udine International Competition for Composers, Italy: Special Mention and Medal of the President of the Italian Republic for Transference, for flute, clarinet, violin, cello and piano.
- 2011 - Presque Rien International Competition Prize, Paris: prize winner with Mémoires, for electroacoustic sounds.

== Recordings ==
- ...as it flies..., Sargasso SCD 28053
- Between, Sargasso SCD 28038
- Beyond The Bridge, Sargasso SCD 28023
- Beyond The Bridge, mnemosyne label, Synthese 8, LD278058/59
- Drang. Sargasso SCD 28059
- Encounter, Sargasso SCD 28038
- Epitaph, Sargasso SCD 28038
- Epitaph, Electroshock label, 007
- Fado, Sargasso SCD 28059
- Koan, Sargasso SCD 28049
- Hinayana, Sargasso SCD 28089
- I Am - Sargasso SCD 6143.
- In the Temple - Animato Records ACD6144.
- Inwards, Sargasso SCD 28059
- Mémoires in Presque Rien Competition Prize CD Label, Vol. I, Paris 2017. (Limited Edition)
- Musica Reservata Animato Records, ACD6136
- Nowhere, Sargasso SCD 28053
- Nowhere to hide in Other Places, NEOS 12423 (2024).
- Phonai. Sargasso SCD 28023
- Phonai, Electroshock, 2 ELCD 006 electroshock label
- Present Otherness in Other Presences Sargasso SCD 28057
- Renge-Kyo, Sargasso SCD 28023
- Satori, Sargasso SCD 28049
- Shambhala in Other Places, NEOS 12423 (2024).
- Somewhere in Other Places, NEOS 12423 (2024).
- Spirits, Sargasso SCD 28023
- Still, Sargasso SCD 28049
- Theorem, Living Artists Recordings, Vol.3. living artists label
- There in Other Places, NEOS 12423 (2024).
- Thereafter in Other Places, NEOS 12423 (2024).
- Transfiguration. Sargasso SCD 28059
- Transient. Sargasso SCD 28059
- Verso L’Alto in 20 Jahre Ensemble Plus, ORF Voralberg ORF, 2016 (Limited Edition).
- Verso L’Alto in Other Places, [https://en.neos-music.com/product/john-palmer-other-places/ NEOS 12423] (2024).
- Vision, Sargasso SCD 28023
- Waka, Sargasso SCD 28053
- Without, in Dots/Lines, Takao Hyakutome (2015)
- Woanders in Other Places, NEOS 12423 (2024).

== Bibliography ==
Books:

Im Inneren: Die Musik von John Palmer – Gespräche und Essays, edited by Sunny Knable, German Foreword by Egbert Hiller (2025). Vision Edition. ISBN 978-1-0687122-3-4.

Harpsichord Reimagined - Resonances in Contemporary Music, edited by John Palmer and Jane Chapman (2025). ISBN 978-1-0687122-1-0.

Looking Within: The Music of John Palmer - Dialogues and Essays, edited by Sunny Knable (2021). Vision Edition, ISBN 978-0-9931761-7-3.

Conversations (2015, 2024 second edition), Vision Edition 023-MC. ISBN 978-1-7397815-6-9.

Mortuos Plango, Vivos Voco by Jonathan Harvey. An aural score, analysis and discussion (2018), 008-MA, 009-MP, 0010-MP Vision Edition. ISBN 978-0-9931761-3-5. ISMN: 979-0-9002315-4-3, 979-0-9002315-5-0.

Rhythm to go (2013), Vision Edition 002-MP. 2013. Fourth edition 2016. ISMN 979-0-9002315-1-2.

Jonathan Harvey's Bhakti for chamber ensemble and electronics (2001), Edwin Mellen Press, Studies in History and Interpretation of Music. ISBN 0-7734-7436-6; ISBN 978-0-7734-7436-9 * mellenpress

Formal Strategies in Composition. PhD Thesis, City University, London, 1994.

Articles and Papers:

Introduction to ‘Images of the mind' (1997). Paper given at the 1997 KlangArt International Congress ‘New Music & Technology’ in Osnabrück, Germany. Published in ‘Musik und Neue Technologie 3, Musik im virtuellen Raum’ (edited by Bernd Enders), Universitätsverlag Rasch, Osnabrück (2000). ISBN 3-934005-64-0.

Conceptual models of interaction: towards a perceptual analysis of interactive composition (1997-8) Paper given at the 1997 Sonic Arts Network Conference, University of Birmingham, UK, 10–12 January 1998. Published in the Seamus Journal, USA, Vol. XIV no. 1, Summer 1999. SEAMUS, Sonic Arts Network

Perceptual Abstraction and Electroacoustic Composition (1998) Paper given at the 1998 Seamus Conference, Dartmouth College, NH, USA, 16–18 April 1998 (1997–98). Published in the Seamus Journal, USA, Vol. XIII, No. 2, Fall 1998. SEAMUS

Listening: towards a new awareness of a neglected skill (1997) Paper for the Stockholm Hey Listen! International Conference on Acoustic Ecology, 9–13 June 1998 Published by the Royal Swedish Academy of Music, June 1998.

Which Global Music? (1999) Paper given at the 1999 Klangart Congress, Osnabrueck, Germany, June 1999. Published in ‘Musik und Neue Technologie 4’ (edited by Bernd Enders), Epos music Universitätsverlag Osnabrück (2003). ISBN 978-3-923486-01-4, ISBN 978-3-923486-02-1 epos music publisher read article

The lesson of freedom: Remembering Luc Ferrari (2005) Published in 'Soundscape - The Journal of Acoustic Ecology', Vol. 6, No. 1, Spring/Summer 2005. ISSN 1607-3304 Soundscape
