= Chalkboard scraping =

Scraping a chalkboard

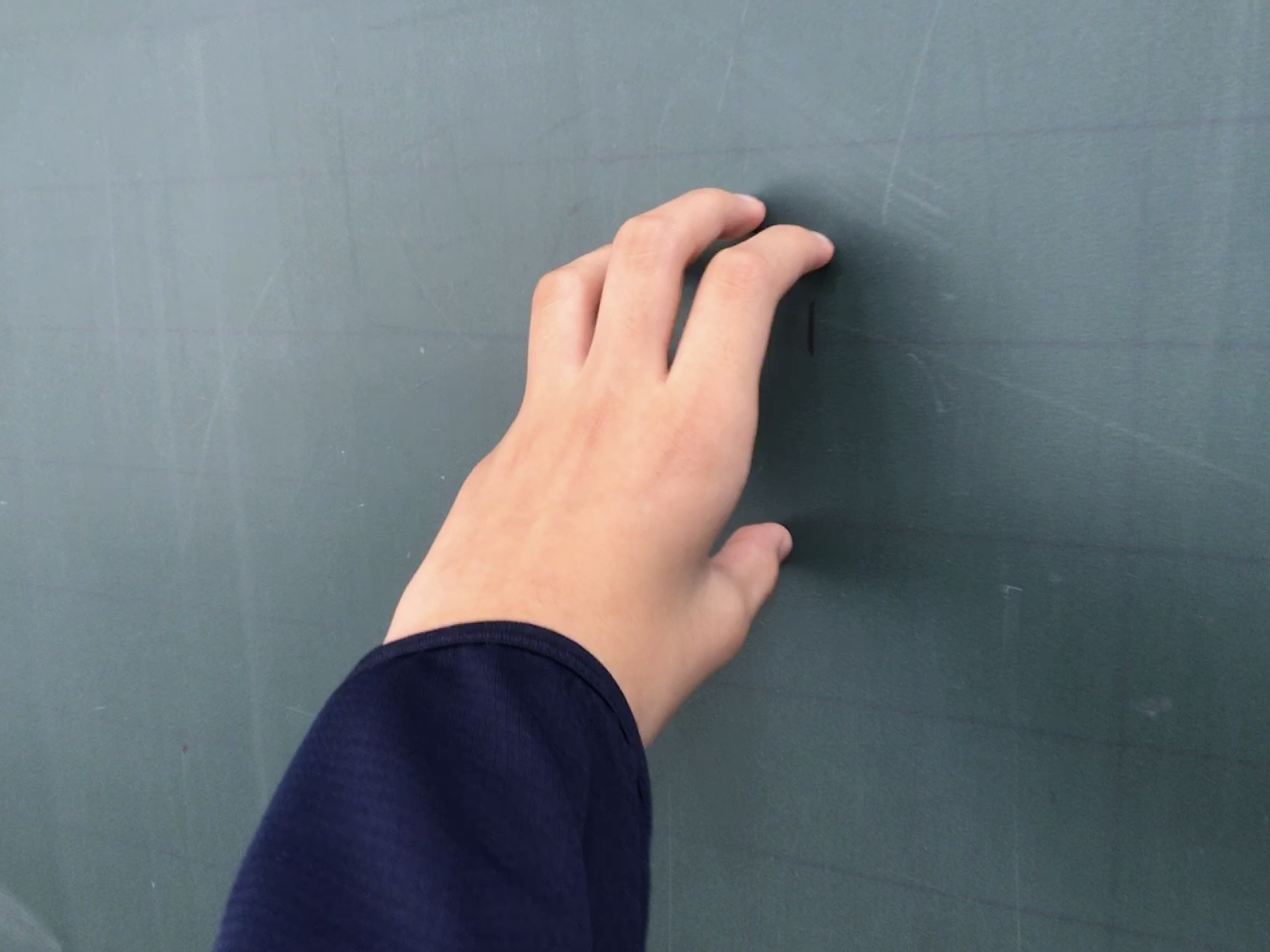
Scratching on a chalkboard

Scraping a chalkboard (also known as a blackboard) with one's fingernails produces a sound and feeling which most people find extremely irritating. The basis of the innate reaction to the sound has been studied in the field of psychoacoustics (the branch of psychology concerned with the perception of sound and its physiological effects).

== Physiological response ==
=== Brain stem reflex ===
In response to audio stimuli, the mind's way of interpreting sound can be translated through a regulatory process called the reticular activating system. Located in the brain stem, the reticular activating system continually listens, even throughout delta-wave sleep, to determine the importance of sounds in relation to waking the cortex or the rest of the body from sleep. Chalkboard scraping, or noises that elicit an emotional response, have been known to trigger tendencies from the fight or flight response which acts as the body's primary self-defense mechanism.

== Emotional response ==
=== Distinct emotion ===
A study published in 2017, in Frontiers in Psychology, found that the emotion elicited by this sound and similar sounds such as a knife scraping a plate, was similar to but distinct from disgust. The physiological response was a very slight initial fall in heart rate followed by a sharp rise, returning to normal after about 6 seconds. This pattern differed from that elicited by disgust and was shared by speakers of Spanish (which has a word for the emotion: grima) and speakers of German and English (which have no single word for the emotion). Spanish volunteers who were asked to suppress their response to grima-inducing sounds were able to do so to some extent but there was no change in response to sounds that induced disgust. Some volunteers said that grima could be induced not only by sounds but also by the feel of some objects, such as sponge rubber or cork.

=== Primate heritage hypothesis ===
One explanation for the adverse reaction is that the sound is similar to the warning call of a primate, as would have been commonly heard among human ancestors in prehistoric times. However, a study using cotton-top tamarins, a species of New World monkey, found that they reacted similarly to both high-pitched sounds similar to fingernails on chalkboard, and to amplitude-matched white noise. In contrast, humans are less averse to the white noise than to scraping.

A 1986 study used a tape-recording of a three-pronged garden tool similar to a fork being "grided" across a chalkboard, which roughly reproduces the sound of fingernails on chalkboard. The recording was then manipulated, removing pitches at the extremities and the median. The results were then played back. It was determined that the median pitches are in fact the primary cause of the adverse reaction, not the highest pitches as previously thought. The authors hypothesized that it was due to predation early in human evolution; the sound bore some resemblances to the alarm call of macaque monkeys, or it may have been similar to the call of some predator. This research won one of the authors, Randolph Blake, an Ig Nobel Prize in 2006. More recent research contradicts this hypothesis.

=== Physical hypothesis ===
In a 2011 study, musicologists Michael Oehler and Christoph Reuter hypothesize that the unpleasantness of the sound is caused by acoustic resonance due to the shape of the human ear canal which amplifies certain frequencies, especially those in the range of 2000 to 4000 Hz (the median pitches mentioned above); at such a level that the sound would trigger pain in human ears.

== See also ==
- Chalkboard paint
- Misophonia
- Shrillness
