= Husmann =

Husmann is a surname. Notable people with the surname include:

- Ed Husmann (1931–2018), American football player
- Heinrich Husmann (1908–1983), German professor
- Max Husmann (1888–1965), Swiss educator
- Ralf Husmann (born 1964), German television producer, screenwriter, and writer
- Ron Husmann (born 1937), American actor

== See also ==
- Hussman
