= Hussman =

Hussman is a surname. Notable people with the surname include:

- John Hussman (born 1962), American academic and stock trader
- Walter E. Hussman Jr. (born 1947), American journalist and newspaper publisher

== Institutions ==
- The UNC Hussman School of Journalism and Media, named after the Hussman journalism family

== See also ==
- Husmann
