= Eckhard Weymann =

Eckhard Weymann (born in 1953) is a German music therapist.

Born in Wuppertal, Weymann studied piano pedagogy at the Hochschule für Musik und Tanz Köln and completed his music-therapeutic training from 1978 to 1980 in Mentorenkurs Musiktherapie Herdecke. Together with Frank Grootaers, Tilmann Weber and Rosemarie Tüpker he founded the Institut für Musiktherapie und Morphologie (IMM) . He holds a doctorate and is a professor for music improvisation and music therapy at the Hochschule für Musik und Theater Hamburg as well as supervisor at the Deutsche Gesellschaft für Supervision und Coaching.

His most famous publications are his psychological studies on musical improvisation Zwischentöne from 2004 and this, together with Hans-Helmut Decker-Voigt, Paolo Knill and Christine Decker-Voigt, the publication of Lexikon Musiktherapie in 1996.

== Publications ==
- Aus der Seele gespielt : eine Einführung in die Musiktherapie. (2000). With Hans-Helmut Decker-Voigt.
- Vermittlungen ... musically speaking : zum improvisationsunterricht im musiktherapiestudium. (2001). With Carl Bergstrøm-Nielsen
- Zwischentöne : psychologische Untersuchungen zur musikalischen Improvisation. (2004)
- Klangbrücken Musiktherapie in der häuslichen Versorgung von Menschen mit Demenz - ein Leitfaden für die Praxis. (2015)
- Ethics in music therapy: how to address ethical questions, and how to find ways to handle ethical dilemmas. With Thomas Stegemann.
- Lexicon Musiktherapie. (2009). With Hans-Helmut Decker-Voigt
