= Rosemarie Tüpker =

German music therapist and musicologist

Rosemarie Tüpker (born 15 February 1952) is a German music therapist and musicologist.

== Biography ==
Born in Korschenbroich, Tüpker first studied piano and percussion at the Musikhochschule Köln and then psychology, philosophy and musicology with direct graduation to doctorate at the University of Cologne. While still a student, she took part in the first training course for music therapists (mentoring course music therapy in Herdecke) from 1978 to 1980 and then worked in in-patient psychotherapeutic care.

She was a student of Wilhelm Salber and Jobst Fricke and co-founder of the Institute for Music Therapy and Morphology (IMM) together with Eckhard Weymann, Tilmann Weber and Frank Grootaers, which emerged from the research group "Music Therapy and Morphology" and initiated seminars and morphological further education. Morphological music therapy is an in depth psychological and art analogous view of music therapy processes without claiming to be a treatment method in its own right. The research group developed concepts for the analysis of music therapeutic improvisations and treatment processes.

From 1990 to 2017, Tüpker headed the diploma course in music therapy and the master's course Klinische Musiktherapie at the University of Münster. In 2005 she habilitated with her work Musik in Rehabilitation und Therapie. She has been retired since autumn 2017. She continues to supervise the doctoral course in music therapy at the University of Münster.

Her research focuses on music in fairy tales, qualitative research methods of artistic therapies as well as topics of music therapy and music psychology from a morphological and psychoanalytical perspective.

In the work Musik im Märchen, published in 2011, Tüpker presented the results of more than ten years of research on the occurrence and significance of music in European folk tales. Cultural-historical, musicological and psychological questions were examined by comparing over three hundred fairy tales. In addition to statements on the musical instruments used, the perception of music as a profession, different fairy tale traditions, typical playing situations and the gender question, an interpretation pattern/typification of the motives was presented, while content analysis was developed from the text material of the fairy tale. The types found are named as: Music as outwardly and inwardly moving, creation of a mental space, music as the connecting link between two worlds, music as the foreign, music as desired, music and healing, music transforms, music as witness, music and identity. At the same time, references to today's understanding of music will be established. A more detailed in depth psychology analysis is devoted to the Brothers Grimms' fairy tales: Das Eselein and two fairy tales of Sinti and Romani people: The Creation of the Violin and Der Sohn kämpft gegen den Vater (The Son Fights Against the Father). The investigations show the diversity of the concept of music in fairy tales and the clear traces of cultural and historical changes. To date, the final register of the 329 fairy tales studied represents the most comprehensive collection of European fairy tales in which music appears.

The theoretical background of the investigation was formed by Wilhelm Salber's morphological psychology and the psychoanalysis according to Sigmund Freud and Carl Gustav Jung, the newer psychoanalytic concepts of developmental psychology, self psychology and culture theory.

== Publications ==
- Music in Gestalt Theory, Morphology and Music Therapy. In: Gestalt Theory. Vol.47, No 2-3, 283-294. DOI10.2478/gth-2026-0016. online
- How I ended up in Herdecke. In: An Important Period in the History of European Music Therapy. Symposion and Music Therapy Mentor Course. Herdecke Germany, 1978-1908. Ed. Inge Nygaard Pederson, 2025, p. 19-26. Online pdf
- Profile 45: Rosemarie Tüpker – Germany. In: John Mahoney (Ed.): The Lives of Music Therapists: Profiles in Creativity - Volume 2, Dallas: Barcelona Publishers 2017. ISBN 978-1-945411-22-9
- Märchen von nah und fern. Einfach erzählt für die Arbeit in sozialen Kontexten. Waxmann-Verlag, Münster 2020. ISBN 978-3-8309-4206-1
- with Harald Gruber, Gabriele Schmidt, Peter Sinapius (ed.): Teilnehmende Beobachtung in Kunst und Therapie. HPB University Press, Berlin, Hamburg 2020. ISBN 978-3-7502-8257-5
- Spielräume der Musiktherapie. (ed.) Reichert-Verlag, Wiesbaden 2019. ISBN 978-3-954-90392-4
- with Harald Gruber (ed.): Spezifisches und Unspezifisches in den Künstlerischen Therapien. HPB University Press, Berlin, Hamburg 2017. ISBN 978-3-7450-8826-7
- Ich singe was ich nicht sagen kann : zu einer morphologischen Grundlegung der Musiktherapie. Kölner Beiträge zur Musikforschung Band 152, Bosse, Regensburg 1988. 3rd reworked and extended edition 2013. ISBN 978-3732-25411-8
- Musik im Märchen. Reichert Verlag, Wiesbaden 2011. ISBN 978-3895-00839-9
- with Peter Petersen and Harald Gruber (ed.) Forschungsmethoden Künstlerischer Therapien. Reichert-Verlag Wiesbaden 2011. ISBN 978-3895008306
- Durch Musik zur Sprache. Handbuch. Books on Demand, Norderstedt 2009. ISBN 978-3837-06948-8
- with Bernd Reichert: Morphologische Musiktherapie mit Kindern. In Stiff/Tüpker (ed.): Kindermusiktherapie – Richtungen und Methoden. Vandenhoeck & Ruprecht, Göttingen 2007, pp. 142–174. ISBN 978-3525491058
- with Armin Schulte (ed.): Tonwelten: Musik zwischen Kunst und Alltag. Zur Psycho-Logik musikalischer Ereignisse. Psychosozial-Verlag, Gießen 2006. ISBN 978-3898-06466-8

== Awards and honours ==
- 2019: Laureate of the Wildweibchenpreis
