= Günther Rötter =

German musicologist (born 1954)

Günther Rötter (born 1954) is a German musicologist and music psychologist.

== Life and career ==
Born in Addernhausen, Rötter studied school music, educational science and philosophy in Detmold and Paderborn as well as musicology, psychology and philosophy at Technische Universität Berlin. There, he received his doctorate in 1985 under the direction of Helga de la Motte-Haber on the subject: 'Die Beeinflussbarkeit emotionalen Erlebens von Musik durch analytisches Hören. From 1989 to 1994, he was a research assistant at the University of Münster. After a professorship at the University of Vechta and the habilitation in 1996, Günther Rötter received a professorship for musicology at the Technische Universität Dortmund. From 2006 to 2014, he was dean of the Faculty of Arts and Sports Sciences there.

Rötter's research focus is on the psychology of music. In empirical studies he often deals with topics close to everyday life, such as music at the dentist or listening to music in the car. In doing so, he refuted unchecked assumptions such as that listening to music during homework distracted pupils or that music in the department shop increases the willingness to buy.

Rötter is (co-)publisher of encyclopaedias and manuals in the field of systematic musicology.

== Publications ==
- Handbuch Funktionale Musik. Psychologie – Technik – Anwendungsgebiete. Springer, Berlin, New York, ISBN 978-3-658-14362-6 (print) ISBN 978-3-658-14362-6 (Online-Version Inhalte)
- with Helga de la Motte-Haber (ed.): Lexikon der Systematischen Musikwissenschaft. – Musikästhetik – Musiktheorie – Musikpsychologie – Musiksoziologie vol. 6. Laaber-Verlag, Laaber 2010 ISBN 978-3-89007-566-2
- with Helga la Motte-Haber (ed.) Musikpsychologie. Handbuch der systematischen Musikwissenschaft vol. 3. Laaber: Laaber-Verlag. 2004 ISBN 978-3-89007-564-8
- mit Martin Ebeling (ed.): Hören und Fühlen. Schriftenreihe der Carl Stumpf Gesellschaft, Lang, Frankfurt 2012, ISBN 978-3-631-63455-4
- Musik und Zeit. Kognitive Reflexion versus rhythmische Interpretation. Lang, Frankfurt 1997, ISBN 978-3-631-44653-9
- Die Beeinflussbarkeit emotionalen Erlebens von Musik durch analytisches Hören. Dissertation. Lang, Frankfurt 1996, ISBN 978-3-8204-9172-2
