= The Creation of the Violin =

Transylvanian Roma fairy tale

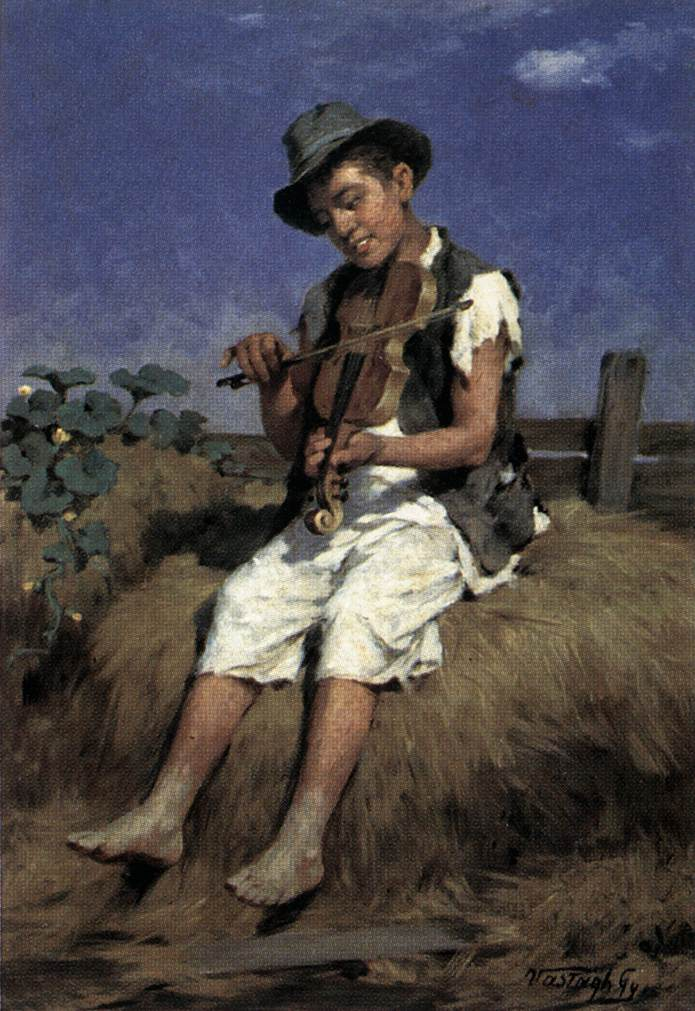
Hegedűs Cigány Fiú (Gypsy Boy Fiddler) by György Vastagh

"The Creation of the Violin" (German: Die Erschaffung der Geige) is a Transylvanian/South Hungarian Roma (gypsy) fairy tale.

There are two such tales by the same title. In the tale mainly discussed here, a boy is born to a mother, who dies in childbirth, having conceived the baby by consuming the hag-witch's prescription of milk inside a pumpkin. The boy wins the king's daughter by succeeding in performing an unprecedented feat: with the help of the fairy queen Matuya/Matuja, he creates the world's first violin and bow, and plays it to his audience who laugh and cry to the tune, under the influence of the fairy.

The other tale of this same title is recognized as an analogue of the Grimm tale "The Singing Bone".

== Textual sources ==
The tale, translated into German, was published by Heinrich von Wlislocki in 1890 and included in his German book, About the Travelling Gypsy People: Scenes of the Life of the Transylvanian Gypsies. Wlislocki attributes his source to be Siebenbürgisch (Transylvanian) Gypsy, but admits the story is also known among the kortorar (nomadic gypsies) in Southern Hungary.

An original text written in Romani, with the German translation appended, was published in Anton Herrmann (Antal Herrmann)'s paper; this text being presumably South Hungarian-Romani. (Note: The term schetra ('violin') which appears in the text is commented as being South Hungarian.)

== Plot summary ==
A poor couple wishes in vain to have a child, and the wife complains about her misery to an old woman she meets in a forest. The hag sends her home with the instruction, "Go home and cut open a pumpkin (German: Kürbis; Romani: dudum), pour milk into it and drink it. You will then give birth to a boy who will be happy and rich!" Although the wife follows her advice and gives birth to a beautiful baby boy, she falls ill and dies shortly afterward.

When the boy is twenty years old, he travels the world to seek his fortune. He comes to a big city, where a rich king rules. The king has a wonderful daughter, whom he will give in marriage to a man who can do something which no one in the world has done before.

Many men try their luck and fail, paying for their failures with their lives. When the naive boy asks the king what he should do, he is thrown into a dark dungeon. Matuyá (Romani: Matuja), the fairy queen, appears to him in a bright light and gives him a box and a rod; she tells him that he should pluck some hairs from her head and string them over the box and the rod. Then he should bow the hairs of the box with the hairs of the rod, playing the violin to make people happy or sad as Matuyá laughs and cries into the instrument. The boy demonstrates his artistic skill to the king, who is overjoyed and gives him his beautiful daughter as his wife. The tale ends with, "This is how the violin came to the world (Kade avelas schetra andre lime)". (Note: According to Herrmann, schetra was the term for violin among the Southern Hungarian Roma, whereas hegedive was the word for violin among the Transylvanian Roma, and lávuta for the Hungarian Roma more generally.)

== Analysis ==
=== Origins ===
The tale has folkloric origins and magical content; common in fairy tales, the old hag and the good fairy both possess magical powers. The good fairy, Matuyá, is based on magic tales of the Hindu tradition (common in Roma tales). Matuyá appears in Transylvanian, Hungarian, Polish, Russian and Serbian Roma mythology as queen of the Ursitory. These fairies, typically beautiful women who live in mountainside palaces, enjoy singing and dancing and symbolise music.

=== Parallels ===
A telling close to this version of folktale by Polish writer Jerzy Ficowski entitled Zaczarowana skrzynka (English: "The Magic Box") occurs in his collection Gałązka z drzewa słońca (1961). The English translation appeared in the anthology Sister of The Birds and Other Gypsy Tales (1976). In this Polish version, the helpful spirit is a beech tree spirit named Matuja, who also prescribes milk drunk out of the hollow of a pumpkin to cure infertility, and the boy then born is named "Bachtalo".

Creation tales for musical instrument do exist in other cultures or regions, for example, the Hungarian fairy tale, "The Violin", and the story of the Mongolian morin khuur. Both differ significantly from the Transylvanian tale. In Greek mythology, the creation of the pan flute by Pan and Syrinx is a well-known example.

=== Under the same title ===
Another Transylvanian Roma tale with the same title (also published by Wlislocki in 1886; later translated by Groome) is less-known, probably because it is confusing and lacks a happy ending. In this version, a young women contacts the devil because she admires a rich hunter who ignores her. She sacrifices her family for the devil's violin to attract the hunter; her father becomes its body, her four brothers become the strings and her mother becomes the bow. In the end, the young woman is carried off by the devil when she refuses to worship him; the violin remains in the forest until it is found and taken by a travelling gypsy. This version is discussed as an analogue of the Grimm tale Der singende Knochen ("The Singing Bone", KHM 28), and this version also has a closely resembling Hungarian Roma (gypsy) counterpart.

=== Publication history ===
One of the best-known Roma fairy tales, "The Creation of the Violin" is part of several collections (including non-Roma collections). It is occasionally read before an audience, broadcast as a radio play or fairy-tale play for children and used in schools.

=== Hermeneutical interpretation ===
Rosemarie Tüpker interpreted the fairy tale in a hermeneutical analysis of modern audiences. In addition to requesting reflections on the full story, Tüpker sought comments on specific topics: poverty and childlessness, a rich king with a beautiful daughter and the achievement of the unprecedented.

The tale explores the polarity between two worlds, characterised by poverty and wealth. The rich king possesses his daughter like a belonging and wants to give her away as a prize, without considering her feelings. The story is about avarice, success and failure and making decisions, exemplified by the competition. Only the old hag and Matuya, the fairy, can help achieve what is otherwise impossible.

The other world is symbolised by the violin, used here as a prototype for all music. This is a world of emotion and the evocation of emotion in others. The demonstration of something unprecedented combines visual and aural perceptions.

"The Creation of the Violin" can also be interpreted as a combination of the male and the female in a world without desire. Psychoanalytically, it involves generativity and triangulation. From the male and the female, a third object is produced: music, which evokes joy or sorrow. The power of a musician (who evokes feelings) is quite different from the power of a king, who rules by force.

It has been noted that neither the son of the poor woman nor the daughter of the king were from intact families. The infant boy's father is not mentioned as a father, and the mother of the king's daughter is not mentioned at all.

The violin expresses the duality of laughter and tears, joy and sorrow and love and death. The violin was seen as a very emotional instrument. However, in reality, contrary to the fairy tale, it takes years of practice, to express emotion with the instrument and evoke emotion in listeners.
