= Roland Eberlein =

German musicologist

Roland Eberlein (born 19 October 1959) is a German musicologist.

== Life and work ==
Born in Trossingen, Eberlein studied musicology in Göttingen, Gießen and Cologne. He received his doctorate in 1988, followed by his habilitation in 1996. In 1994 he was a visiting professor at the University of Hamburg. After the Bologna Process came into force he no longer aspired to a professorship. Since 2005 he has been a member of the board of directors of the Walcker Foundation for Organ Science Research. Since 2011 he has been in charge of its business. In 2008 Eberlein founded the Siebenquart publishing house, which specializes in scientific books about the musical instrument organ.

Today he works as a publisher, freelance researcher and private lecturer at the University of Cologne. His research focuses on musical perception, the origin of tonality and the history of the pipe organ.

Eberlein is descended as great-grandson of Gerhard Eberlein (1858-1923) of the Silesian pastoral family Eberlein.

== Scientific contributions ==
Eberlein was initially engaged in the experimental study of musical perception. In the course of his experiments he came to the insight that pattern recognition plays an essential role in musical perception: Frequently recurring melodic turns and harmonic sequences are stored as harmonic-melodic interval patterns in the course of musical experience in adolescence and are henceforth recognized in newly sounding music. The recognition of patterns enables on the one hand the construction of expectations of continuation (e.g. in dissonances and sixth chords) and the closing effect of cadences, and on the other hand the perception of tones in octave intervals as harmonically equivalent.

Building on these insights, Eberlein described the formation of the typical harmonic sequences of tonal music in the course of music history and tried to justify each individual step of this development as part of a circular process: A musical practice of one kind or another forms the musicians' musical perception by learning the recurring musical patterns and thereby forming expectations of continuation. On the basis of the musical perception thus formed, rules of theory of composition are formulated. These rules can interact in a completely unforeseen way generations or even centuries later, and profoundly change the musical practice then in existence. These changes, in turn, bring about a change in musical perception and new rules of musical composition - and so on. This sphere of activity is influenced on the one hand by the universals of musical perception and on the other hand by Geistesgeschichte, i.e. the intellectual currents and tendencies existing at a given time.

After the publication of his habilitation thesis Die Entstehung der tonalen Klangsyntax (The Origin of Tonal Sound Syntax) in 1994, Eberlein turned his attention to organ history. His scientific activity in this field is characterized by the attempt to bring together the many individual insights gained since about 1930 in countless research papers on individual organ builders and on the organ history of individual regions into an overall picture of organ history. In organ circles Eberlein became known especially through his encyclopedia of organ stop Orgelregister, ihre Namen und ihre Geschichte, which is considered a standard work, as well as through his Geschichte der Orgel, the first comprehensive German-language presentation of organ history from its beginnings to the present day, which has been published in book form since 1929.

From 2004 onwards, Eberlein was one of the first to draw the attention of the organ world in letters to the editor, lectures and numerous articles to the increasing population ageing of the organ public, the dwindling interest of the younger generations in the organ and the resulting consequences: discontinuation of concert series, lack of young organists, neglect of organs, decline of organ workshops. Eberlein postulates as a major cause of this development the steadily growing gap between the traditional repertoire of organists, which has remained unchanged for decades, and the musical preferences of broad sections of society, which have changed rapidly in recent decades. He therefore advocates adapting the organ repertoire to the changing musical tastes of our time.

== Publications ==
=== Books ===
- Theorien und Experimente zur Wahrnehmung musikalischer Klänge.
- Kadenzwahrnehmung und Kadenzgeschichte – ein Beitrag zu einer Grammatik der Musik. Peter Lang, Frankfurt. 1992.
- Die Entstehung der tonalen Klangsyntax. Peter Lang, Frankfurt. 1994.
- Orgelregister, ihre Namen und ihre Geschichte. Siebenquart, Cologne 2008.
- Meine orgelgeschichtliche Fundkiste. Daniel Kunert Dienstleistungen, Unterlüß 2010.
- Die Geschichte der Orgel. Siebenquart, Cologne 2011.

=== Essays ===
- Ars antiqua: Harmonik und Datierung. In Archiv für Musikwissenschaft. 43, 1986, pp. 1–16.
- Vormodale Notation. In Archiv für Musikwissenschaft 55, 1998, pp. 175–194.
- Proportionsangaben in Musik des 17. Jahrhunderts, ihre Bedeutung und Ausführung. In Archiv für Musikwissenschaft 56, 1999, pp. 29–51.
- Soziale Hintergründe des Quintenparallelenverbots. In Musikwissenschaft – Musikpraxis, Festschrift für Horst-Peter Hesse zum 65. Geburtstag. Mueller-Speiser, Anif/Salzburg 2000, pp. 38–53.
- Über den Ursprung der gedeckten Orgelregister. In Ars Organi 49, 2001, H. 3, pp. 151–156.
- Die Sifflöte – Hintergründe eines unscheinbaren Orgelregisters. In Ars Organi 50, 2002, issue 3, pp. 146–150.
- Über den Ursprung der repetierenden Mixturen. In Ars Organi 51, 2003, H. 3, pp. 155–161.
- Stell dir vor, die Orgel spielt und keiner geht hin. Zur Situation der Orgel in Deutschland am Beginn des 21. Jahrhunderts. In Hermann J. Busch† und Roland Eberlein (ed.): Die Orgel – Wer soll sie spielen, wer will sie hören? Report on the 11th Colloquium of the Walcker Foundation for Organ Science Research, 8–3 November 2005 in Bremen. Walcker-Stiftung für orgelwissenschaftliche Forschung, 2012, pp. 7–27.
- Aus alt mach’ neu – aus neu mach’ alt. Tendenzen in der Registerentwicklung 1920–40. In Hermann J. Busch† und Roland Eberlein (ed.): Zwischen Postromantik und Orgelbewegung. Report on the twelfth Colloquium of the Walcker Foundation for Organ Science Research from 19 to 20 September 2008 in Karlsruhe. Walcker-Stiftung für orgelwissenschaftliche Forschung, 2011, pp. 41–59.
- Geben und Nehmen zweier Kulturen – Historische Wechselbeziehungen zwischen französischem und deutschem Orgelbau hinsichtlich der Register. In Hermann J. Busch† und Roland Eberlein (ed.): Deutsche und französische Orgelkunst und Orgelbaukunst – Divergenzen und Konvergenzen. Bericht über das dreizehnte Colloquium der Walcker-Stiftung für orgelwissenschaftliche Forschung vom 3. bis 4. September 2009 in Amsterdam. Walcker-Stiftung für orgelwissenschaftliche Forschung, 2012, pp. 7–21.
- Popularmusik auf der Orgel – ein neuer Trend? In Roland Eberlein (ed.): Original und Bearbeitung in der Orgelmusik. Report on the fourteenth Colloquium of the Walcker Foundation for Organ Science Research on October 13–15, 2011 in St. Florian/Linz. Walcker-Stiftung für orgelwissenschaftliche Forschung, 2011, pp. 22–35.

=== Blog ===
- Blog Orgelwelt aktuell: Aktuelle Entwicklungen und Tendenzen in der Orgelwelt
