= Studienrat (Germany) =

German civil service title

Teachers in the higher service (Höherer Dienst)
| Title | Salary grade |
| Oberstudiendirektor (OStD) | A 16 |
| Studiendirektor (StD) | A 15 |
| Oberstudienrat (OStR) | A 14 |
| Studienrat (StR) | A 13 |

Studienrat [ˈʃtuːdi̯ənˌʁaːt] (male) or Studienrätin [ˈʃtuːdi̯ənˌʁɛːtɪn] (female; abbreviation StR), literally “educational councillor”, is a German civil service title commonly held by tenured secondary-school teachers, especially at state-run Gymnasien (grammar schools). The post belongs to the higher service (Höherer Dienst) and is typically remunerated at salary grade A 13, which marks entry into this career group. Administrative officials at a comparable level usually hold the title Regierungsrat (“government councillor”).

Holders of the title normally teach at the upper secondary level leading to the Abitur, Germany’s university-entrance qualification (often compared to A-levels). Depending on the federal state (Land), the title may also be used for teachers in other school types, including vocational schools.

== Variants and related titles ==
In the former German Democratic Republic, Studienrat was used as an honorary designation for teachers.

At church-run schools, some teachers hold the title Studienrat im Kirchendienst (“educational councillor in church service”, abbreviated StR i. K.). These teachers are employed under church law, which in many respects is comparable to state civil-service law.

During the preparatory training period (Referendariat), candidates use the title Studienreferendar.

Higher ranks within this career track are Oberstudienrat (A 14), Studiendirektor (A 15), and Oberstudiendirektor (A 16).

== Appointment and training ==
Appointment as Studienrat generally requires a university degree in at least two teaching subjects together with formal pedagogical training. This is followed by a period of supervised practical training (Referendariat) and an initial probationary appointment before tenure is granted. Exact requirements and procedures vary by federal state.

== Historical background ==
In 1918, Kaiser Wilhelm II issued a decree replacing the former title Oberlehrer (“senior teacher”) with the honorary title Studienrat. In Prussia, most grammar-school teachers had previously held the title Oberlehrer, while a smaller proportion carried the honorary designation Gymnasialprofessor.

The introduction of the title Studienrat and related ranks formed part of a broader standardisation of teacher titles in the German civil service and was associated with a social revaluation of grammar-school teachers within the educated middle class (Bildungsbürgertum).

== Legal controversy ==
According to Der Spiegel, the state of Bremen sought in the late 1970s to replace the official title Studienrat with a uniform designation for teachers at public schools. After legal proceedings, the Federal Constitutional Court ruled that official titles in the civil service must remain sufficiently differentiated to reflect distinct offices, responsibilities, and levels of performance.
