= Arnold Schmitz =

German musicologist

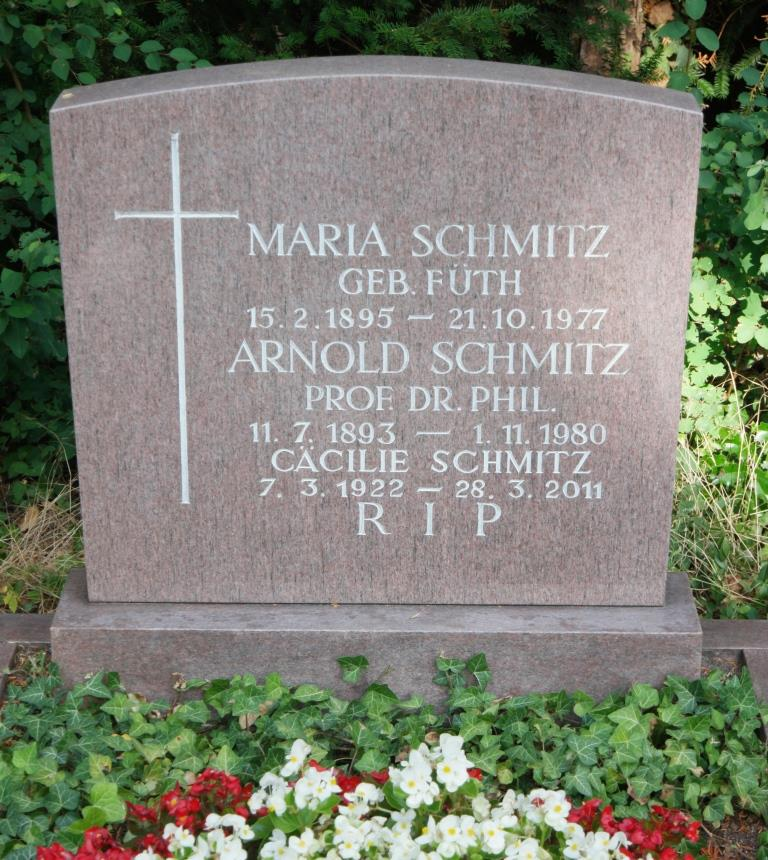
Grave of Arnold Schmitz at the Hauptfriedhof Mainz

Arnold Schmitz (11 July 1893 – 1 November 1980) was a German musicologist who was particularly concerned with Beethoven.

== Life ==
Born in Le Sablon, Metz, Schmitz habilitated in 1921 and was subsequently professor at the Rheinische Friedrich-Wilhelms-Universität Bonn and the Breslau University. From 1946 he taught at the University of Mainz, whose rector he was in 1953/54 and 1960/61. He was a member of the Historische Kommission für Schlesien. In 1973, the Beethoven House in Bonn appointed him an honorary member for his Beethoven research.

Schmitz died in Mainz at age 87.

== Publications ==
Books

- Beethovens "zwei Prinzipe", Berlin: Ferdinand Dümmler, 1923 OCLC 504083375
- Unbekannte Skizzen und Entwürfe, Beethoven, Ludwig van, Bonn: Beethovenhaus, 1924 OCLC 458383998
- Das romantische Beethoven-Bild. Darstellung und Kritik, Berlin: Ferdinand Dümmler, 1927 OCLC 85080144
- Beethoven, Bonn a. Rh.: Buchgemeinde, 1927 OCLC 781303233
- "Zur Frage nach Beethovens Weltanschauung und ihrem muskalischen Ausdruck" in Beethoven und die Gegenwart : Festschrift d. Beethovenhauses Bonn, Ludwig Schiedermair zum 60. Geburtstag (also editor), Berlin : Ferdinand Dümmler, 1937 OCLC 54195276
- Die Bildlichkeit der wortgebundenen Musik Johann Sebastian Bachs, Mainz : Schott, 1950 OCLC 1464895
- Ausgewählte Aufsätze zur geistlichen Musik, Paderborn : Ferdinand Schöningh, 1996 OCLC 36088997

Sheet music

- Oberitalienische Figuralpassionen des 16. Jahrhunderts, Mainz : Schott, 1955 (Choral part). OCLC 2304099
