= Heinrich Husmann =

20th century German musicologist

Heinrich Husmann (December 16, 1908 Cologne, Germany − November 8, 1983 Brussels) was a German musicologist and university professor.

== Biography ==
At the University of Göttingen, Husmann was a pupil of Friedrich Ludwig and then of Johannes Wolf, Arnold Schering, Friedrich Blume and Erich Moritz von Hornbostel at the Humboldt University, Berlin, where he received his doctorate in 1932.

His first position was as an assistant lecturer at the musicological institute at the University of Leipzig, completing his Habilitation in 1941, becoming acting director in 1944. While there he was responsible for the collection of musical instruments in the Grassi Museum. In 1948 he completed a second Habilitation at the University of Hamburg, organising its musicological institute in 1949. He went on to a position as Reader there in 1956 and full professor in 1958, before being appointed professor of musicology at the University of Göttingen in 1960, where he established the Musikinstrumentensammlung der Universität Göttingen.

== List of selected works ==
- Husmann, Heinrich (1940). Die Drei-und vierstimmigen Notre-Dame-Organa: Kritische gesamtausgabe (in German). Leipzig: G. Olms.

== Bibliography ==
- Oron, Aryeh (14 June 2017). "Heinrich Husmann (Arranger) - Short Biography". Bach Cantatas Website.
