= Karlsruhe University of Education =

University of Education Karlsruhe
- Pädagogische Hochschule Karlsruhe
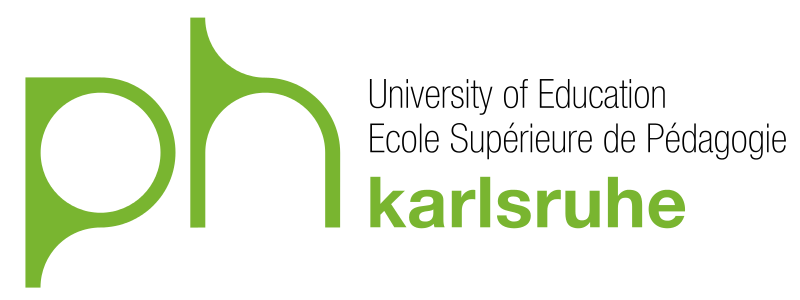
- Established: 1962
- Principal: Klaus Peter Rippe
- Students: 3,742 (2016/17)
- Location: Karlsruhe, Baden-Württemberg, Deutschland; 49°00′49″N 8°23′35″E
- Website: www.en.ph-karlsruhe.de

Karlsruhe University of Education (Pädagogische Hochschule Karlsruhe) is an institution of higher education in Karlsruhe, Germany. Its focus is on educational processes in social, institutional and cultural contexts. It has approximately 3,742 students, 180 researchers and lecturers and about 90 administrative staff members.

== History ==
The university was established in 1962, although teacher training can be traced back to 1757.

== Region ==
Karlsruhe offers many cultural events, especially the ZKM Center for Art and Media Karlsruhe, which is well known for its art events.

== The Karlsruhe campus ==
The campus of Karlsruhe University of Education is located near the center of Karlsruhe. There are three buildings on the main campus and another near the Cooperative State University Karlsruhe.

== Studies ==
The University of Education Karlsruhe offers a wide range of programs, especially for students to become qualified for educational professions such as:

- Teaching profession at primary schools and secondary schools
- Bachelor Program
  - Early Childhood Education
- Master Program
  - Educational Science
  - Intercultural Education
  - Migration and Multilingualism
  - Biodiversity and Environmental Education

== Faculties ==
=== Faculty I – Humanities ===
- Institute of Educational Studies and History of Education
- Institute of Educational Studies with a Focus on Extra-Curricular Education
- Institute of Early Childhood Education
- Institute of School and Education Development for Primary and Secondary Schools
- Institute of Psychology
- Institute of Philosophy
- Institute of Catholic Theology
- Institute of Protestant Theology
- Institute of Islamic Theology

=== Faculty II – Languages and Literature Studies and Social Sciences ===
- Institute of German Philology and Literature
- Institute of Multilingualism
- Institute of Economics and its Didactics
- Institutes of Political Science
- Institute of Trans-disciplinary Social Sciences

=== Faculty III – Natural Sciences, Cultural Studies, Mathematics and Sports ===
- Institute of Culture of Daily Life and Health
- Institute of Physical Education and Sports
- Institute of Mathematics and Computer Science
- Institute of Biology and School Gardening
- Institute of Chemistry
- Institute of Physics and Technical Education
- Institute of Art
- Institute of Music
