= Günter Kleinen =

German musicologist

Günter Kleinen (born 10 January 1941) is a German musicologist and professor of musicology with a focus on music education and systematic musicology as well as music psychology.

== Life ==
Born in Cologne, Kleinene passed his Abitur in 1960 in Cologne, thenstudied sound engineering between 1960 and 1963 at the Robert Schumann Hochschule Düsseldorf, including violin and piano. In 1963, he began studying musicology, psychology and philosophy at the University of Hamburg. With a dissertation on the subject of Experimentelle Studien zum musikalischen Ausdruck, he was awarded a doctorate in 1967.

From 1968 onwards, Kleinen was a research assistant at the then Pädagogische Hochschule Braunschweig, at the same time completing a Lehramt studies for elementary and secondary schools in music, fine arts and English language and literature, which he completed with the 1st teacher examination. From 1974 to 1977, he was Academic Council at the University of Münster, where he completed his Habilitation for the subject 'Musikpädagogik mit dem Schwerpunkt auf den psychologischen und akustisch-technischen Grundlagen musikalischer Didaktik. In 1977, Kleinen was appointed to a C3-Professorship at the University of Bremen (at that time under the title Music Pedagogy with a focus on functions of musical mass culture, later changed to Musikpädagogik und Systematische Musikwissenschaft). In 1993, 1995 and 1998, he completed guest lectureships lasting several weeks, including at the Chinese Music School in Beijing. In 2003, a lecture tour took him to China, South Korea and Taiwan. In 2019, Kleinen participated in the First International Symposium on the History of Music in the Han and Tan Period in Xi'an, where he was appointed visiting scholar at the local music academy.

For several years, Kleinen served on the board of the professional associations Arbeitskreis für Schulmusik und allgemeine Musikpädagogik (AfS), Arbeitskreis Musikpädagogische Forschung (AMPF) and Deutsche Gesellschaft für Musikpsychologie (DGM). He was co-editor of the yearbook Musikpsychologie (1984 to 2006). In 2016, he completed the research projects Backdoor (Begabung und Kreativität in der populären Musik) and Cream (Vergleichende musikpädagogische Forschung zum guten Musiklehrer). Kleinen is currently engaged in independent musicological research, including current trends in Asian music (China, South Korea, Japan), the integration of Arab musical culture into the music of the European avant-garde and other music pedagogical research methods.

== Publications ==
- Kleinen, Günter: Experimentelle Studien zum musikalischen Ausdruck. Dissertation, Universität Hamburg, 1968
- Werner Breckoff, Günter Kleinen, Werner Krützfeldt, Werner S. Nicklis, Lutz Rössner, Wolfgang Rogge among others: Musik aktuell: Informationen, Dokumente, Aufgaben; ein Musikbuch für die Sekundar- und Studienstufe. Bärenreiter, Kassel [among others] 1971
- Günter Kleinen: Zur Psychologie musikalischen Verhaltens. Diesterweg, Frankfurt 1975
- Florian Tennstedt und Günter Kleinen: Rockmusik und Gruppenprozesse: Aufstieg und Abstieg der Petards. Fink, Munich 1979
- Günter Kleinen (ed.): Kind und Musik. Laaber, 1984.
- Günter Kleinen: Die psychologische Wirklichkeit der Musik. Wahrnehmung und Deutung im Alltag. Bosse, Kassel 1994.
- Günter Kleinen (ed.): Begabung und Kreativität in der populären Musik. Lit, Münster 2003.
- Günter Kleinen (ed.): Musik und Kind. Chancen für Begabung und Kreativität im Zeitalter der Neuen Medien. Laaber Verlag, Laaber 2003.
- Günter Kleinen: Chinesische Musik und der kulturelle Transfer auf der Seidenstraße. Epos, Osnabrück 2011.
