= Stefan Weinzierl =

German percussionist (born 1985)

Stefan Weinzierl (born 7 February 1985) is a German percussionist.

== Leben ==
Born in Günzburg, Weinzierl first studied music education, musicology and educational science at the University of Regensburg (Staatsexamen). This was followed by artistic percussion studies at the Hochschule für Musik und Theater Hamburg, which he completed with the master's examination in 2010.

Already during his master studies he was endorser for the Dutch percussion manufacturer ADAMS.

Weinzierl performs mainly as a solo musician or in changing chamber music formations. He often works together with artists from other genres. For example in projects with the actors Ulrike Folkerts, Anja Topf, Wanja Mues, Rolf Becker and Ludwig Blochberger. In his concerts, Weinzierl uses a large number of percussion instruments and also often works with electronics. He interprets compositions by mainly contemporary composers, as well as his own compositions and improvisations. His projects have included guest performances at the Greatest Hits Festival for contemporary music of the Elbphilharmonie, concerts, at the enter 4th festival Prague, the NIME Oslo and the San Francisco Symphony With Dockside Drums he has been creating his own concert series in Hamburg's Hafencity since 2015. On 3 October 2019, Weinzierl was solo musician at the ARD television service for the German Unity Day in Kiel.

In his recording studio in Hamburg, Weinzierl produces drum recordings for media productions of all kinds. He acts as studio musician and/or composer and producer. For the Silberfuchs-Verlag he composed and produced the music for the audio books Mecklenburg-Vorpommern:hören.erleben.entdecken, Martin Luther:Freiheit. Grace. Man and for the Buchfunk Verlag Ich musste raus. Wege aus der DDR.

Weinzierl also designs and directs Music Education programmes. As a lecturer at workshops he was involved in the project BeatObsession of the Elbphilharmonie Hamburg and works in the field of teambuilding for companies.

== Audio Books ==
- 2015: Corinna Hesse: Mecklenburg-Vorpommern. Recitants: Anne Moll and Clemens von Ramin. 1 CD. Silberfuchs-Verlag, ISBN 978-3-940665-38-6.
- 2016: Corinna Hesse: Martin Luther – Freiheit. Gnade. RecitatMensch Sprecher: Rolf Becker. 1 CD, 80 min. Silberfuchs-Verlag, ISBN 3-940665-36-3.
- 2019: Constantin Hoffmann: Ich musste raus – Wege aus der DDR. Recitant: Ludwig Blochberger. 2 CDs, 118 min., Buchfunk Verlag, ISBN 978-3-86847-428-2.
