= Wolfgang Auhagen =

German musicologist

Wolfgang Auhagen (born 1953) is a German musicologist.

== Life ==
Born in Hamburg, Auhagen studied musicology, art history and philosophy at the Georg-August-Universität Göttingen from 1973 until 1982. There he was awarded his doctorate with the thesis and in 1992 with a thesis on the subject Experimentelle Untersuchungen zur auditiven Tonalitätsbestimmung in Melodien habilited. He teaches at the Martin-Luther-Universität Halle-Wittenberg. Since 2005 Auhagen has been a foreign member of the Akademie gemeinnütziger Wissenschaften zu Erfurt.

From 2006 to 2010 he was Vice Dean of the Philosophical Faculty II of the Martin Luther University Halle-Wittenberg and from 2009 to 2017 the President of the Gesellschaft für Musikforschung.

== Publications ==
- Experimentelle Untersuchungen zur auditiven Tonalitätsbestimmung in Melodien. / 1, Text. Kölner Beiträge zur Musikforschung, vol. 180, Bosse-Verlag Regensburg, 1994
- Wahrnehmung, Erkenntnis, Vermittlung : musikwissenschaftliche Brückenschläge : Festschrift für Wolfgang Auhagen.
- with Bram Gätjen and Christoph Reuter (ed.): Musikalische Akustik. (Kompendien Musik), Laaber-Verlag, Laaber 2015
- Systematische Musikwissenschaft : Ziele, Methoden, Geschichte.
