= Günther Massenkeil =

German musicologist (1926–2014)

- Born: 11 March 1926; Wiesbaden, Germany
- Died: 17 December 2014 (aged 88); Bad Honnef, Germany
- Education: Technische Hochschule Darmstadt; University of Mainz; Sorbonne
- Occupations: Musicologist; Baritone; Academic teacher; Editor
- Organizations: University of Bonn; Beethoven Archive; Max-Reger-Institute; Görres Society
- Awards: Orlando di Lasso Medal; Ehrenring of the Görres Society; Order of St. Gregory the Great

Günther Massenkeil (11 March 1926 – 17 December 2014) was a German musicologist, academic teacher, writer and concert singer (baritone). His main field of research was sacred music of the 16th to 20th century. He served as director of the musicology department at the University of Bonn from 1966 to 1991. He became known beyond academia for his editing and supplementing of the eight-volume encyclopaedia, Das Große Lexikon der Musik.

== Life ==
=== Childhood and youth ===
Massenkeil was born in Wiesbaden as son of Josef Massenkeil (1891–1987) and his wife Lotte, née Böhlen (1901–1997). His father came from a Rheingau family of teachers. He taught for many years as a student councillor in Wiesbaden and was a senior government and school councillor and finally director of the Humanistisches Gymnasium in Wiesbaden after the Second World War. He had studied classical philology and newspaper science and was active as a writer, especially in the field of the history of County of Nassau. Günter Massenkeil published a reprint of his father's publications in 2009. Josef Massenkeil was a member of parliament for the Zentrum party in the Hessian municipal parliament until its dissolution in 1933. After the war, he was one of the founders of the CDU in Wiesbaden. Massenkeil was the family's third-born child. The first child died in infancy. The second, Heinz Josef (b. 1925), became a gynaecologist and chief physician in Mönchengladbach.

Günther received piano lessons from his father then later at the music seminar Elisabeth Güntzel in his hometown, where he became an accomplished pianist, who would also accompany well-known singers such as the tenor Franz Fehringer. In addition, he received organ lessons and, at age 14, was asked by the Wiesbaden church of St. Kilian to replace the organist who had been drafted for military service. In 1941, the priest of St. Birgid in Wiesbaden-Bierstadt entrusted him with setting the patron saint's hymn, which is still sung there today.

Due to a serious illness, his military service was deferred, and he was able to complete his schooling at the Humanistisches Gymnasium with the Abitur in 1944. He studied at the Technische Hochschule Darmstadt to become an organ builder. In early March 1945, he was drafted to the Wehrmacht but was sent to a military hospital in Sigmaringen due to illness. When the war ended, he was imprisoned as a prisoner of war by the French for two years. At his last prison, the "Dépôt de prisonniers de guerre 101 Mutzig", he founded a choir and organised concerts, and was given the privilege of being able to leave the camp under guard more often and to play the organ in the church services of nearby Soultz-les-Bains.

=== Music studies ===
After his release from war captivity, Massenkeil studied musicology and music pedagogy at the University of Mainz from 1947 to 1951. From 1950, he was a member of the Catholic student fraternity VKDSt Hasso-Rhenania Mainz. In order to "get to know another side of France" he applied for a French government scholarship, which took him to the Sorbonne in Paris in 1951/52. In 1952, he achieved his doctorate in Mainz with a thesis on Giacomo Carissimi (The oratorical art in the Latin histories and oratorios of G. Carissimi). He passed the state examination for the artistic teaching profession of music at secondary schools in 1953. In 1954 he became a scientific assistant in Mainz. In 1961, he was habilitated with a paper on Wolfgang Amadeus Mozart, Untersuchungen zum Problem der Symmetrie in der Instrumentalmusik W. A. Mozarts (Investigations on the problem of symmetry in the instrumental music of W. A. Mozart).

=== Scientific activity ===
In 1966 he was appointed professor and director of the musicology department at the University of Bonn, and held the position until 1991. From 1972 to 1974, he was also director of the Bonn Beethoven Archive and, from 1972 to 1998, he was chairman of the board of trustees of the Max-Reger-Institute. From 1975 to 2011, he was head of the section for musicology of the Görres Society, and editor of its Kirchenmusikalischen Jahrbuch (Year book of church music).

His main field of research was sacred music of the 16th to 20th century. His works on Carissimi and Marc-Antoine Charpentier are well known, as are those on Mozart and his two-volume work, Oratorium und Passion (Oratorio and Passion). He became known beyond academia for the eight-volume encyclopaedia Das Große Lexikon der Musik, based on Dictionnaire de la musique (1970–1976) by Marc Honegger, which he edited and supplemented.

=== Artistic activity ===
From 1954, Massenkeil was also active as a singer (bass baritone). In 1975 he perfected his singing skills by studying with Ellen Bosenius at the Musikhochschule Köln and gained international recognition as an oratorio and lieder singer, making numerous radio and disks recordings. The Lieder der Rheinromantik um 1840 were also released on CD. Massenkeil ended his career as a concert singer in 1994.

=== Private life ===
In 1954, Massenkeil married Ursula Gross (1928–2000) with whom he had four children. They lived first in Wiesbaden, moving to Mainz in 1960. Massenkeil traveled frequently, especially to France. One of these trips took him back to Soultz-les-Bains and to the organ of his war captivity. It was not until 2005 that he learned that this was a Silbermann organ. He supported an urgently needed restoration with many actions and personal commitment, and was awarded honorary citizenship of Soultz-les-Bains. In 2008 the organ was put back into use in his presence.

Massenkeil continued to work as a writer, lecturer and church musician after his retirement. He died in Bad Honnef at the age of 88.

== Honours and awards ==
- 1991: Orlando-di-Lasso-Medaille of the Allgemeiner Cäcilien-Verband für Deutschland
- 2006: Ehrenring of the Görres Society
- 2006: Knight of the papal Order of St. Gregory the Great
- 2011: Honorary citizenship of Soultz-les-Bains in Alsace

== Work ==
- Die oratorische Kunst in den lateinischen Historien und Oratorien Giacomo Carissimis OCLC 720289726 1952, (Mainz University, dissertation, 1952, typewritten).
- Untersuchungen zum Problem der Symmetrie in der Instrumentalmusik W. A. Mozarts OCLC 1067348764 Steiner, Wiesbaden 1962 (at the same time: Mainz University, habilitation, 1961).
- Das Oratorium (part of Das Musikwerk. 37, ZDB-ID 786192-8). Volk Verlag Gerig, Cologne 1970, (also published in English: The Oratorio (Anthology of Music. 37, ZDB-ID 2294628-7) also in 1970).
- as editor with Marc Honegger: Das Große Lexikon der MusikOCLC 475115998 8 volumes. Herder, Freiburg (Breisgau) among others. 1978–1982.
- Oratorium und Passion OCLC 231785453. (Handbuch der musikalischen Gattungen. 10, 1–2). 2 parts. Laaber-Verlag, Laaber 1998–1999, ISBN 3-89007-133-3 (Part 1), ISBN 3-89007-481-2 (Part 2).
- Ein Wiesbadener Philologe als Schriftsteller. Joseph Massenkeil (1891–1987). Beiträge zur Volkskunde und Geschichte seiner Hessen-Nassauischen Heimat und zu anderen Themen OCLC 682103530 Published by Günther Massenkeil. Self edited, Bad Honnef 2010.

=== Contributions ===
- "Die Wiederholungsfiguren in den Oratorien Giacomo Carissimis", Archiv für Musikwissenschaft, vol. 13, nr. 1, 1956, pp. 42–60, JSTOR 929558.
- "Marc-Antoine Charpentier als Messenkomponist" OCLC 8304780665 Carl Dahlhaus, Reiner Kluge, Ernst Hermann Meyer, Walter Wiora (eds.): Bericht über den Internationalen Musikwissenschaftlichen Kongress, Leipzig, 1966, Bärenreiter, Kassel among others 1970, pp. 228–238.
- "Religiöse Aspekte der Gellert-Lieder Beethovens", Walter Wiora (ed.): Religiöse Musik in nicht-liturgischen Werken von Beethoven bis Reger (Studien zur Musikgeschichte des 19. Jahrhunderts. 51). Gustav Bosse Verlag, Regensburg 1978, ISBN 3-7649-2135-8, pp. 83–96.
- "Rheinromantik im deutschen Sololied um die Mitte des 19. Jahrhunderts" OCLC 1067324133 Siegfried Kross (ed.): Musikalische Rheinromantik (Beiträge zur rheinischen Musikgeschichte 140 Arbeitsgemeinschaft für Rheinische Musikgeschichte. Bericht über die Jahrestagung, 1985). Merseburger, Kassel 1989, ISBN 3-87537-234-4, pp. 146–166.
- "Die Bonner Beethoven-Kantate (1845) von Franz Liszt", Jobst Fricke (ed.): Die Sprache der Musik. Festschrift Klaus Wolfgang Niemöller zum 60. Geburtstag am 21. Juli 1989 (Kölner Beiträge zur Musikforschung. 165). Gustav Bosse Verlag, Regensburg 1989, ISBN 3-7649-2407-1, pp. 381–400.
- "Die Heiligen Drei Könige in der Musik" OCLC 605540810 Peter Ackermann, Ulrike Kienzle, Adolf Nowak (eds.): Festschrift für Winfried Kirsch zum 65. Geburtstag (Frankfurter Beiträge zur Musikwissenschaft. 24). Schneider, Tutzing 1996, ISBN 3-7952-0857-2, pp. 21–33.
- "Wort und Ton in christlicher Musik : ausgewählte Schriften" OCLC 436278431

Numerous other publications in magazines, collected editions and encyclopaedias, partly reprinted as Wort und Ton in christlicher Musik, Paderborn, 2008.

=== Editions ===
- Mehrstimmige Lamentationen aus der ersten Hälfte des 16. Jahrhunderts. 1965.
- Cantatas by G. Carissimi (1605–1674). 1986.
- Franz Liszt – Kantate zur Inauguration des Beethoven-Monuments zu Bonn. 1986.
- Max Reger – Vier Choralkantaten. 4 vol. 1988–1990.
