= Hans-Peter Reinecke =

German actor

Hans-Peter Reinecke (1941–2005) was a German actor.

== Partial filmography ==
- Spotkania w mroku (1960) - 1. Angeklagter
- Holubice (1960) - Ulli
- Das hölzerne Kälbchen (1960) - Hirte
- Beschreibung eines Sommers (1963) - Tenser
- Julia lebt (1963) - Zatopek
- Christine (1963)
- Der fliegende Holländer (1964) - Steuermann
- Trace of Stones (1966) - Galonski
- Unterwegs zu Lenin (1969) - Kleiner Soldat
- KLK Calling PTZ – The Red Orchestra (1971) - Karl Winkler
- Nakovalnya ili chuk (1972) - Van der Lube
- Der Untergang der Emma (1974) - Mischas Vater
- Zum Beispiel Josef (1974) - Bruno
- Jacob the Liar (1974) - Soldat vor Latrine
- Punane viiul (1975) - Brückner
- Requiem für Hans Grundig (1976)
- Die Moral der Banditen (1976) - Bürgermeister Sandberg
- Tambari (1977) - Heinrich Töller
- Wer reißt denn gleich vor’m Teufel aus (1977) - Räuberhauptmann
- Taubenjule (1983) - Klaus Kürbs
