= Christoph Reuter =

German musicologist

Christoph Reuter (born 28 November 1968) is a German University professor for systematic musicology at the University of Vienna.

== life ==
Born in Duisburg, Reuter studied musicology at the University of Cologne, received his doctorate summa cum laude in 1996 and his habilitation in 2002. He has held guest professorships or teaching positions at several universities (University of Vienna, Hochschule für Musik Franz Liszt, Weimar), and has also been a managing partner of a Cologne-based internet agency since 2000. Since 2008, Reuter has been university professor for systematic musicology at the University of Vienna.

== Scientific activity ==
His research interests include musical acoustics, music physiology and psychological aspects of music perception as well as music-related internet/software projects. Examples of his manifold studies in the field of systematic musicology are investigations on sound colour perception, on the Variophon, on music automatons, on perception of unpleasant noises and on musical dice games..

== Memberships ==
Reuter is a board member of the Deutsche Gesellschaft für Musikpsychologie (DGM) and in 2006-2008 was the editor of the yearbook of the Society for Music Psychology. He is a member of the board and head of the working group of the "Wissenschaft" in the Österreichische Gesellschaft für Musik und Medizin (ÖGfMM). He is also a member of the European Society for the Cognitive Sciences of Music (ESCOM), the Consulting Boards of Musicae Scientiae, the Österreichischen Gesellschaft für Musikwissenschaft (ÖGMW), the Gesellschaft für Musikforschung (GfM), the Deutschen Gesellschaft für Akustik (Dega), the Internationalen Arbeitskreis für systematische Musikwissenschaft (IASM) as well as the Gesellschaft für selbstspielende Musikinstrumente (GSM).

== Publications ==
- Der Einschwingvorgang nichtperkussiver Musikinstrumente. Lang, Frankfurt 1995 (ISBN 3-631-49437-8)
- Die auditive Diskrimination von Orchesterinstrumenten. Diss. Lang, Frankfurt 1996 (ISBN 3-631-30886-8)
- Klangfarbe und Instrumentation. Habil. Lang, Frankfurt 2002 (ISBN 3-631-50272-9)
- together with Wolfgang Auhagen: Kompendium Musikalische Akustik. (Kompendien Musik 16), Laaber, Laaber 2013 (ISBN 978-3-89007-736-9)
- Reuter, Christoph, Enders, Bernd; Jacobi, Rolf: Lexikon Musikautomaten. (Encyclopedia of Mechanical Musical Instruments)(German/English), CD-ROM, Schott, Mainz 2000.
- Reuter, C., Czedik-Eysenberg, I., Siddiq, S., & Oehler, M. (2018) Formant Distances and the Similarity Perception of Wind Instrument Timbres. In: R. Parncutt, & S. Sattmann (Eds.): Proceedings of ICMPC15/ESCOM10 (p. 367-371). Graz: University of Graz.
- Reuter, Christoph; Siddiq, Saleh: The colourful life of timbre spaces - Timbre concepts from early ideas to meta-timbre space and beyond. In: Clemens Wöllner, Clemens (Ed.): Body, Sound and Space in Music and Beyond Multimodal Explorations. Sempre Studies in the Psychology of Music. Routledge, London/New York 2017, p. 150-167.
- Reuter, C. (2018). Commentary on "An Exploratory Study of Western Orchestration: Patterns through History" by S.H. Chon, D. Huron, & D. DeVlieger. Empirical Musicology Review 12(3-4), 160–171. doi: dx.doi.org/10.18061/emr.v12i3-4.5992
- Reuter, Christoph: The role of formant positions and micro-modulations in blending and partial masking of musical instruments. In: Journal of the Acoustical Society of America (JASA), Vol. 126,4, 2009, p. 2237.
- Jenny, C., Reuter, C.: Usability of Individualized Head-Related Transfer Functions in Virtual Reality: Empirical Study With Perceptual Attributes in Sagittal Plane Sound Localization. JMIR Serious Games 2020;8(3):e17576, doi: 10.2196/17576.
- Bertsch, M., Reuter, C., Czedik-Eysenberg, I., Berger, A., Olischar, M., Bartha-Doering, L. and Giordano, V. (2020): The "Sound of Silence" in a Neonatal Intensive Care Unit-Listening to Speech and Music inside an Incubator. Frontiers in Psychology 11:1055. doi: 10.3389/fpsyg.2020.01055
- Starcke, K., von Georgi, R., Tiihonen, T. M., Laczika, K.-F., & Reuter, C. (2019): Don't drink and chill: Effects of alcohol on subjective and physiological reactions during music listening and their relationships with personality and listening habits. International Journal of Psychophysiology, 142, 25–32. https://doi.org/10.1016/j.ijpsycho.2019.06.001
- Thiesen, F. C., Kopiez, R., Reuter, C., & Czedik-Eysenberg, I. (2019). A snippet in a snippet: Development of the Matryoshka principle for the construction of very short musical stimuli (plinks). Musicae Scientiae, 102986491882021. https://doi.org/10.1177/1029864918820212
- Reuter, C. (2018). Commentary on "An Exploratory Study of Western Orchestration: Patterns through History" by S.H. Chon, D. Huron, & D. DeVlieger. Empirical Musicology Review 12(3-4), 160–171. doi: dx.doi.org/10.18061/emr.v12i3-4.5992

Current list of publications
