= Systematic musicology =

Scientific study of music using empirical and theoretical methods

Systematic musicology is an umbrella term, used mainly in Central Europe, for a range of subdisciplines and paradigms within musicology. "Systematic musicology has traditionally been conceived of as an interdisciplinary science, whose aim it is to explore the foundations of music from different points of view, such as acoustics, physiology, psychology, anthropology, music theory, sociology, and aesthetics."

Major subdisciplines today are music psychology, sociomusicology (music sociology), philosophy of music (music philosophy), music acoustics (physics of music), cognitive neuroscience of music, and the computer sciences of music (including sound and music computing, music information retrieval, and computing in musicology). These subdisciplines and paradigms tend to address questions about music in general, rather than specific manifestations of music.

According to the Springer Handbook of Systematic Musicology, "(the) sections follow the main topics in the field, Musical Acoustics, Signal Processing, Music Psychology, Psychophysics/Psychoacoustics, and Music Ethnology while also taking recent research trends into consideration, like Embodied Music Cognition and Media Applications. Other topics, like Music Theory or Philosophy of Music are incorporated in the respective sections."

In the European tripartite model of musicology, musicology is regarded as a combination of three broad subdisciplines: ethnomusicology, music history (or historical musicology), and systematic musicology. Ethnomusicology and historical musicology are primarily concerned with specific manifestations of music such as performances, works, traditions, genres, and the people who produce and engage with them (musicians, composers, social groups).

Systematic musicology is different in that it tends not to put these specific manifestations in the foreground, although it of course refers to them. Instead, more general questions are asked about music, which tend to be answered by analysing empirical data, synthesising theory, or both. The 19th-century positivist dream of discovering "laws" of music (by analogy to "laws" in other disciplines such as physics; cf. Adler, 1885) and of defining the discipline of systematic musicology in terms of such laws slowly evaporated. Ideological trends stemming from modernism and later post-structuralism fundamentally altered the nature of the project.

Since systematic musicology brings together several parent disciplines, it is often regarded as being intrinsically interdisciplinary or as a system of interacting subdisciplines (hence the alternative name "systemic"). However, most systematic musicologists focus on just one or a select few of the many subdisciplines. Systematic musicologists who are oriented toward the humanities often make reference to fields such as aesthetics, philosophy, semiotics, hermeneutics, music criticism, Media studies, Cultural studies, gender studies, and (theoretic) sociology. Those who are oriented toward science tend to regard their discipline as empirical and data-oriented, and to borrow their methods and ways of thinking from psychology, acoustics, psychoacoustics, physiology, cognitive science, and (empirical) sociology.

More recently emerged areas of research which at least partially are in the scope of systematic musicology comprise cognitive musicology, neuromusicology, biomusicology, and music cognition including embodied music cognition. As an academic discipline, systematic musicology is closely related to practically oriented disciplines such as music technology, music information retrieval, and musical robotics.

Systematic musicology is less unified than its sister disciplines historical musicology and ethnomusicology. Its contents and methods are more diverse and tend to be more closely related to parent disciplines, both academic and practical, outside of musicology. The diversity of systematic musicology is to some extent compensated for by interdisciplinary interactions within the system of subdisciplines that make it up.
