= List of compositions by Agostino Steffani =

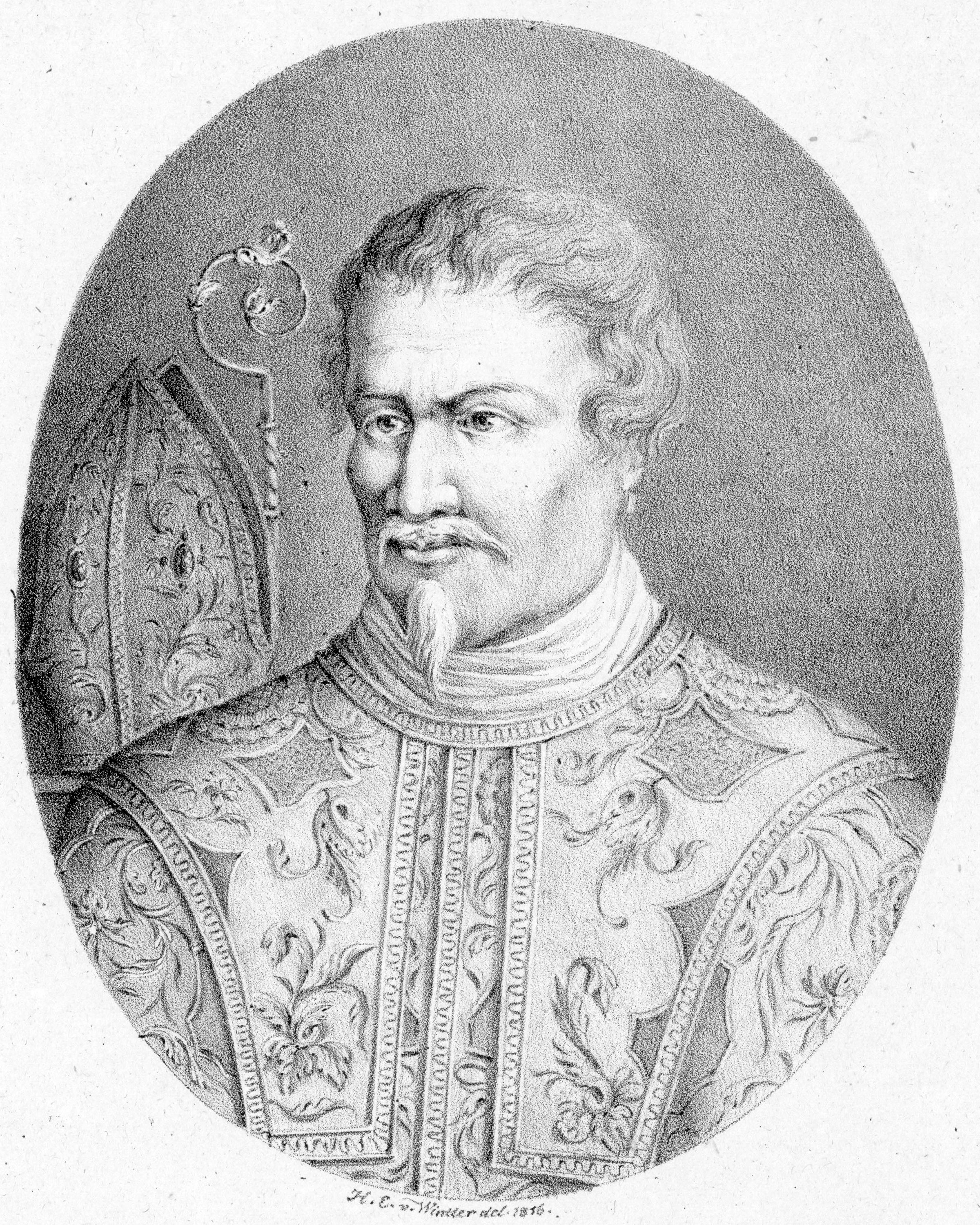
An 1816 lithography of Agostino Steffani from an unknown original

This is a list of compositions by Agostino Steffani.

== Vocal works ==
=== Sacred works ===
- Beatus vir
- Laudate pueri
- Non plus me ligate
- Psalmodia vespertina volans
- Qui diligit Mariam
- Reginam nostram formosissimam
- Sacer Janus quadrifrons tribus vocibus
- Sperate in Deo
- Stabat Mater, for 6 singers and 7 instrumentalists
- Triduanas a Domino

=== Operas ===
- Marco Aurelio, libretto by Ventura Terzago. Munich 1681
- Salome, libretto by Ventura Terzago. Munich 1681
- Audacia e Rispetto. Munich 1685
- Servio Tullio, libretto by Ventura Terzago. Munich 1686
- Erote e Anterote, libretto by Ventura Terzago. Munich 1686
- Ascanio, libretto by Ventura Terzago. Munich 1686
- Alarico il Baltha, cioè l'Audace, re de' goti, dramma per musica, libretto by Luigi Orlandi. Munich, 18 January 1687
- Niobe, regina di Tebe, dramma per musica, libretto by Luigi Orlandi. Munich 1688
- Henrico Leone, libretto by Ortensio Mauro, based on the life of the powerful German prince Henry the Lion. First performed in Hannover on 30 January 1689
- La lotta d'Hercole con Acheloo. 1689
- La superbia d'Alessandro. 1690
- Orlando generoso. 1691
- Le rivali concordi, or Atalanta. 1692
- La libertà contenta, or Alcibiade. 1693
- Amor vien dal destino. Dramma Da Recitarsi Per Ordine Di Sua Altezza Elettorale Palatina In Düsseldorff LÁnno MDCCIX, libretto by Thil Schleuter. Composed in Hanover in 1694, premiered in Düsseldorf 1709
- Baccanali (1695) for the Duke Ernest Augustus of Hannover
- I trionfi, del fato, ovvero Le glorie di Enea 1695
- Briseide (1696) attrib., but probably by Pietro Torri
- Arminio (1707) – a pasticcio composed mainly of items from Steffani's earlier operas.
- Tassilone, Tragedia per Musica, 1709. Edition Gerhard Croll in Denkmäler Rheinischer Musik

==== Arias from operas and serenatas recorded in recitals ====
- A facile vittoria (from Tassilone)
- Amami, e vederai (from Niobe)
- Combatton quest'alma (from I trionfi del fato)
- Dal tuo labbro amor m'invita (from Tassilone)
- Deh stancati, o sorte (from La libertà contenta)
- Foschi crepuscoli (from La libertà contenta)
- Dell'alma stanca a raddolcir le tempre...Sfere amiche, or date al labbro (from Niobe)
- La cerasta più terribile (from La lotta d'Hercole con Acheloo)
- Mie fide schiere, all'armi!...Suoni, tuoni, il suolo scuota (from I trionfi del fato)
- Morirò fra strazi e scempi (from Henrico Leone)
- Ogni core può sperar (from Servio Tullio)
- Ove son? Chi m'aita? In mezzo all'ombre...Dal mio petto (from Niobe)
- Non prendo consiglio (from La superbia d'Alessandro)
- Non si parli che di fede (from Marco Aurelio)
- Notte amica al cieco Dio (from La libertà contenta)
- Padre, s'è colpa in lui (from Tassilone)
- Più non v'ascondo (from Tassilone)
- Schiere invitte, non tardate (from Alarico il Baltha)
- Serena, o mio bel sole...Mia fiamma/Mio ardore (from Niobe)
- Si, si, riposa, o caro...Palpitanti sfere belle (from Alarico il Baltha)
- Sposa, mancar mi sento...Deh non far colle tue lagrime (from Tassilone)
- Suite aus I trionfi del fato
- Svenati, struggiti, combatti, suda (from La libertà contenta)
- T'abbraccio, mia Diva...Ti stringo, mio Nume (from Niobe)
- Timori, ruine (from Le rivali concordi)
- Tra le guerre e le vittorie (from La superbia d'Alessandro)

=== Duets and solo cantatas ===
- Amor vien del destino – duet
- Begl'occhi, oh Dio, non più piangete – duet
- Che sarà di quel pensiero – duet
- Che volete o crude pene – duet
- Crudo Amor morir mi sento – duet
- Dimmi, dimmi Cupido – duet
- Dir che giovi al mal d'amore – duet
- Dolce è per voi soffrire – duet
- Dolce labbro amabil bocca – duet
- E così mi compatite? – duet
- E perchè non m'uccidete – duet
- Fileno, idolo mio – solo cantata
- Fra le tenebre del duolo – duet, attrib. but by Giovanni Legrenzi
- Fulminate, saettate – duet Timms C:I:17
- Gelosia, che vuoi da me? – duet
- Già tu parti – duet
- Guardati, o core – solo cantata
- Hai finito di lusigarmi – solo cantata
- Ho scherzato in verità – duet
- Il piu felice e sfortunato amante – solo cantata
- Inquieto mio cor – duet
- Io mi rido de' tuoi dardi – duet
- Io voglio provar – duet
- Lagrime dolorose – solo cantata
- Libertà! Libertà! – duet
- Lilla mia non vuoi ch'io pianga – duet
- Lontananza crudel, tu mi tormenti – duet
- Lungi dall'idol mio – solo cantata
- M'hai da piangere un dì – duet
- Mia speranza illanguidita – duet
- M'ingannasti fanciullo bendato – duet
- No, no, non voglio se devo amare – duet
- Occhi belli, non piu – duet
- Occhi, perché piangete? – duet
- Placidissime catene – duet
- Porto l'alma incenerita – duet
- Pria ch’io faccia – duet
- Quando ti stringo o cara – duet
- Quanto care al cor voi siete – duet
- Questo fior – duet
- Ribellatevi o pensieri – duet
- Rio destin che a tutte l'ore – duet
- Saldi marmi che coprite – duet
- Sol negl'occhi del mio bene – duet
- Spezza amor, l’arco e li strali – solo cantata for soprano
- Su, ferisci, alato arciero – duet Colin Timms deest
- Tengo per infallibile – duet
- Torna a dar vita al core – duet
- Troppo cruda é la mia sorte – duet Timms C:I:70a
- Tu m'aspettasti al mare – duet
- Valli secrete deh m'accogliete – duet
- Vorrei dire un non so che – duet

== Instrumental works ==
- 6 Sonate da Camera
- Aria for two oboes, bassoon & b.c 'Chomigiola'
