= Rudolf Stephan =

German musicologist (1925–2019)

Rudolf Stephan (3 April 1925 – 29 September 2019) was a German musicologist.

== Life ==
Stephan was born in Bochum. After studying violin at the conservatory, he entered the Institute of Heidelberg, where he studied musicology at the University under the direction of Wolfgang Fortner. With Heinrich Besseler, Stephan went to the University of Göttingen, where he obtained his doctorate in 1950 with a work on Die Tenores der Motetten ältesten Stils by musicologist Rudolf Gerber (1950). Carl Dahlhaus, Ludwig Finscher and Joachim Kaiser were among his classmates. He became known to the German-speaking public at large as the publisher of volume five of Das Fischer Lexikon's "Language", published in the Fischer Library in Frankfurt in 1957. In 1958, Stephan published the book on Neue Musik "Versuch einer kritischen Einführung". His work was approved by Theodor W. Adorno with whom he remained in contact in the following years during radio broadcasts. In 1963, he moved to Göttingen as soon as he obtained his habilitation.

From 1965 to 1976, Stephan was the editor-in-chief of publications for the Institute for New Music and Music Education in Darmstadt. In 1967, he accepted a chair in historical musicology at the Institute of musicology, now the musicology seminar of the Institute of Theatrical Studies at the Free University of Berlin. After his retirement in 1990 he held the rank of professor emeritus. He was a visiting professor in Vienna in 1981, and his colleagues at the Berlin Institute were musicologists Tibor Kneif and Klaus Kropfinger, and from 1984 onwards Jürgen Maehder, who became his Director General from 1990 to 1992. Stephan's successor in 1992 was Albrecht Riethmüller.

Stephan's research focused on the recent history of music since the 18th century and in particular on music from the first half of the 20th century. He has made innovative contributions to the revision of the image of the works of Gustav Mahler, Hans Pfitzner, Max Reger and Paul Hindemith, as well as to the recognition of the importance of the Second Vienna School for the history of music, Arnold Schönberg, Alban Berg and Anton Webern. As a publisher, Stephan contributed to the general editions of Arnold Schönberg's and Alban Berg's musical works (1989–1996).

Among Stephan's students were the musicologist Reinhold Brinkmann (1934-2010), as well as musicologists Rüdiger Albrecht, Regina Busch, Károly Csipák, Klaus Ebbeke, Thomas Ertelt, Werner Grünzweig, Heribert Henrich, Reinhard Kapp, Ulrich Kramer, Claudia Maurer Zenck, Adolf Nowak, Wolfgang Rathert, Christian Martin Schmidt, Matthias Schmidt, Martina Sichardt, Lotte Thaler and the teacher Bernd Riede. The musicologist Andreas Traub was Stephan's long-time assistant in Berlin.

== Homage ==
- Werk und Geschichte: musikalische Analyse und historischer Entwurf, Rudolf Stephan zum 75. Geburtstag, mit einem Verzeichnis der Schriften Rudolf Stephans, by Thomas Ertelt.
