= Orlando generoso =

1691 opera

Orlando generoso is an opera of Agostino Steffani composed to a libretto by Ortensio Mauro after Ariosto's Orlando furioso. The opera was written in 1691, Steffani's fourth for the Duchy of Hanover. The opera was presented again in Hanover in 1692, and in 1695 it was performed at the Oper am Gänsemarkt in Hamburg.

== See also ==
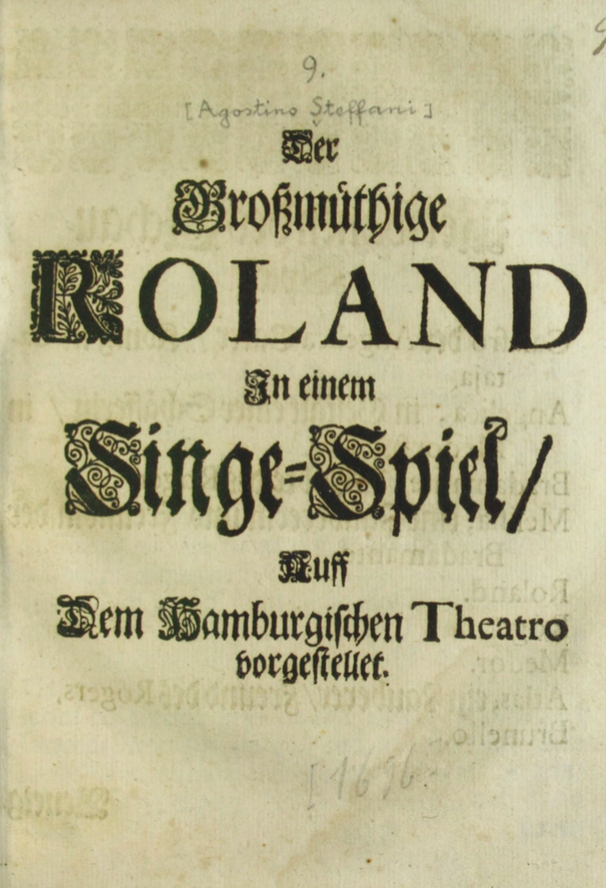
Title page

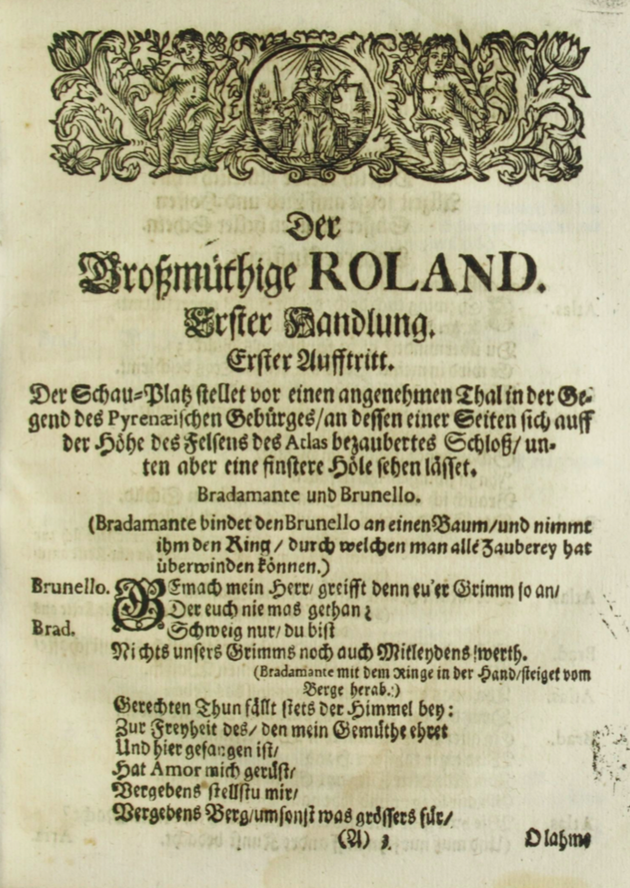
Page 1

German-language Der Großmüthige Roland, published in 1695; based on the 1691 work
- List of compositions by Agostino Steffani

== Recording ==
- Kai Wessel (Orlando), Roberta Invernizzi (Angelica), Susanne Rydén (Bradamante), Franz Vitzthum (Ruggiero), Jörg Waschinski (Medoro), Daniel Lager (Galafro), Wolf Matthias Friedrich (Atlante). Musica Alta Ripa dir. Bernward Lohr 3CD MDG
