= Ludwig Finscher =

German musicologist (1930–2020)

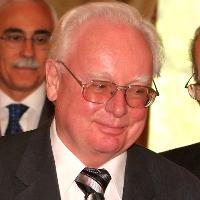
- Born: 14 March 1930; Kassel, Hesse-Nassau, Prussia, Germany
- Died: 30 June 2020 (aged 90); Wolfenbüttel, Lower Saxony, Germany
- Education: University of Göttingen
- Occupations: Musicologist; Music editor
- Organizations: University of Frankfurt; University of Heidelberg
- Awards: Pour le Mérite; Balzan Prize

Ludwig Finscher (14 March 1930 – 30 June 2020) was a German musicologist. He was a professor of music history at the University of Heidelberg from 1981 to 1995 and editor of the encyclopedia Die Musik in Geschichte und Gegenwart. He is respected internationally as an authority on the history of Western Classical music from the 16th century to contemporary classical music, with a view on music in cultural, social, historical and philosophical context, in a clear language for both specialists and lay readers.

== Life and career ==
Born in Kassel, the youngest of five siblings, Finscher studied musicology, English, German and philosophy at the University of Göttingen from 1949 to 1954. Students at the same time included Gerhard Croll, Carl Dahlhaus and Rudolf Stephan. He earned a doctorate with a thesis about the masses and motets by Loyset Compère, with advisor Rudolf Gerber. From 1954, he worked for the Deutsches Volksliedarchiv (German archive of folk songs) in Freiburg im Breisgau. He returned to Göttingen in 1955, working as a freelance journalist and music critic. He became a scientific assistant to Walter Wiora in 1960, first at the University of Kiel and from 1965 at the University of Saarbrücken. In 1967 he obtained his habilitation in Saarbrücken with the work Das klassische Streichquartett und seine Grundlegung durch Joseph Haydn (The classical string quartet and its foundation by Joseph Haydn). From 1968 to 1981, he held a chair for musicology at the University of Frankfurt, and from 1981 until his retirement in 1995 the same position at the University of Heidelberg.

Finscher was president of the Gesellschaft für Musikforschung (Society for music research) from 1974 to 1977 and the International Musicological Society from 1977 to 1981.

He died in Wolfenbüttel on 30 June 2020 at the age of 90.

== Research work ==
One of Finscher's most important accomplishments was his editing, beginning in 1994, of the new edition of the encyclopaedia Die Musik in Geschichte und Gegenwart in 28 volumes, for which he wrote or updated some 40 articles. His extensive works on string quartets, chamber music and Joseph Haydn are regarded as musicological standards, as is the two-volume Music of the 15th and 16th centuries.

Finscher contributed to the complete editions of the works of Christoph Willibald Gluck, W. A. Mozart, and Paul Hindemith. He was also co-editor of the Capellae Apostolicae Sixtinaeque Collectanea Acta Monumenta. He published over 130 articles in anthologies and journals, aiming for simple wording accessible to lay readers as well as specialists.

His approach was described by the Balzan Foundation:

All of Finscher’s publications are fundamental for further study and research. His writings always place the subject and the description of the sources in the foreground; his personal interpretation remains in the background, thus showing his great modesty. For Finscher, music history is part of the greater cultural, social and historical milieu, and he explains facts by their spiritual dependence on the philosophical developments in European thought. His approach is interdisciplinary and his understanding of music history is therefore different from that of musicologists of the past. His language is clear and understandable for non-specialists. When a topic might tempt other authors to use vague metaphors or unusual terminology, he prefers to express his opinion as simply as possible.

== Publications ==
- Die Messen und Motetten Loyset Compères (dissertation)
- Die Musik in Geschichte und Gegenwart

== Awards ==
- 1994 Pour le Mérite
- 1997 Order of Merit of the Federal Republic of Germany
- 2003 Honorary doctorate of the University of Zürich
- 2006 Balzan Prize, awarded on 24 November 2006 by the President of the Italian Republic Giorgio Napolitano in Rome
  For his wide-ranging research activity in the field of musicology; for his penetrating, memorable insights into great works of music; for his profound commentaries on musical phenomena as well as his editorial direction of the new edition of the encyclopaedia Die Musik in Geschichte und Gegenwart, which makes the newest research accessible to a wide circle of musicians and music lovers.
