= Andreas Traub =

German musicologist

Andreas Traub (1949–2026) was a German musicologist and university lecturer.

== Life ==
Traub was born in Göttingen. He was grandson of the theologian and politician Gottfried Traub and son of the theologian Hellmut Traub. He completed his studies at the LMU Munich and the University of Bern and received his doctorate in 1977.

From 1979 to 1990 he worked as assistant to Rudolf Stephan at the Institute for Musicology of the Free University of Berlin. His habilitation then followed in 1994 at the University of Tübingen.

Since 1991 Traub has been researching the music history of Baden-Württemberg. At the same time he taught at the university of Tübingen.

Since 1994 he has held teaching positions at the Staatliche Hochschule für Musik Trossingen.

In 1997 Traub became editor of the Denkmäler der Musik in Baden-Württemberg.

Traub was honorary member of the Gesellschaft für Musikgeschichte in Baden-Württemberg.

== Publications ==
Author

- Andreas Traub: Sándor Veress. In Hanns-Werner Heister, Walter-Wolfgang Sparrer (edit.): Komponisten der Gegenwart. (KDG). Edition text + kritik, Munich 1992 ff. 21. Additional delivery 2001.
- Andreas Traub: Sándor Veress und das Exil: Von der "Transilvanischen Kantate" (1936) zur "Elegie" (1964). In Péter Csobádi et al. (edit.): Das (Musik-)Theater in Exil und Diktatur. Vorträge und Gespräche des Salzburger Symposions 2003. Anif, Salzburg 2005, pp. 533–540.
- Andreas Traub: Veress, Sándor. In Ludwig Finscher (edit.): Die Musik in Geschichte und Gegenwart. (MGG). 2nd edition. People part, vol.16. Bärenreiter, Kassel, Stuttgart 2006, pp. 1487–1492.
- Doris Lanz, Anselm Gerhard (edit.): Sándor Veress. Komponist – Lehrer – Forscher. Kassel 2008. - With contributions from Rachel Beckles Willson, Melinda Berlász, Bodo Bischoff, Simone Hohmaier, Heinz Holliger, Michael Kunkel, Péter Laki, Doris Lanz, Friedemann Sallis, Andreas Traub, Claudio Veress.

Editor

- Andreas Traub (edit.): Sándor Veress. Festschrift zum 80. Geburtstag. Haseloff, Berlin 1986.
- Andreas Traub (edit.): Sándor Veress. Aufsätze, Vorträge, Briefe Wolke, Hofheim 1998.

Editor at Memorials of Music in Baden-Württemberg

- 1. Johann Samuel Welter (1650–1720), The sacred work. Cantatas, Magnificat, hymns, presented by Andreas Traub, 1993
- 2. Ernst von Gemmingen (1759–1813), Four concertos for violin and orchestra, presented by Andreas Traub, 1994
- 3. Augustinus Plattner, Eight double-choir masses (1624), presented by Andreas Traub, 1995
- 4. Musik der Organistenfamilie Druckenmüller, presented by Andreas Traub, 1996
- 6. Johann Wendelin Glaser (1713–1783), Selected cantatas, presented by Andreas Traub and Marco Jammermann, 1998
- 7. Balduin Hoyoul (c. 1548–1594), Latin and German motets, presented by Dagmar Golly-Becker and Andreas Traub, 1998
- 10. Balduin Hoyoul (c. 1548–1594), Magnificat cycle and two masses, Stephan Faber (c. 1580-1632), Cantiones, presented by Andreas Traub, 2001.
- 15. Franz Anton Maichelbeck (1702–1750), Freiburg. Requiem for 2 choirs; 1 mass, presented by Manfred Schuler (†) and Andreas Traub.
- 22. Erasmus Widmann. Weltliche Gesänge und Ritterspiel. Presented by Andreas Traub, Gregor Wittkop and Klaus Peter Leitner.
