= Joachim Kaiser =

German musicologist, critic and journalist

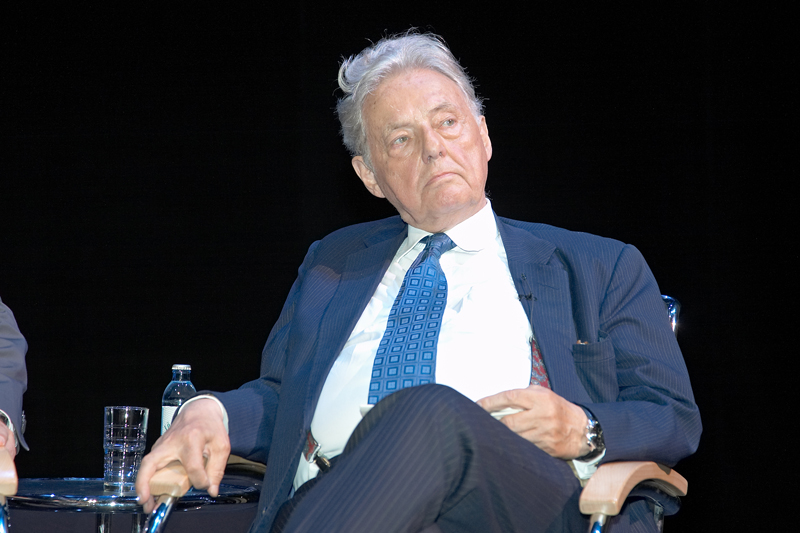
Kaiser in 2007

Joachim Kaiser (18 December 1928 – 11 May 2017) was a German musicologist, critic, and journalist. He worked as a senior editor and cultural critic for the Süddeutsche Zeitung from 1959, contributing reviews and articles on music, literature, and theatre. From 1977 to 1996, he was a professor of music history at the State University of Music and Performing Arts Stuttgart.

== Life ==
Kaiser was born in Milken, East Prussia (now Milki, Poland) on 18 December 1928. He was the son of a country doctor. He became interested in Literature and music at an early age, and began to play the piano at age eight. After the flight and expulsion of Germans from Central and Eastern Europe 1945–1950, he attended the Wilhelm-Gymnasium (Hamburg). He then studied musicology, German studies, philosophy, and sociology at the Georg-August-Universität Göttingen, the Johann Wolfgang Goethe-Universität Frankfurt am Main, and the Eberhard Karls Universität Tübingen. Among his fellow students were musicologists Carl Dahlhaus and Rudolf Stephan.

Kaiser's career as a critic began in 1951. On his review of the Theodor W. Adorno publication: Music and Catastrophe. About the "Philosophy of New Music", Mathias Döpfner described him as one of "the best known and most successful Adorno students ever". Beginning in 1953, Kaiser took part in Group 47. In 1958, he was awarded a doctorate in German Studies at the University of Tübingen on the subject of Franz Grillparzer's dramatic style.

Kaiser worked in the cultural editorial department of the Süddeutsche Zeitung from 1959. He was a member of the writers' association PEN-Zentrum Deutschland.

Although Kaiser was known for his discussion of famous pianists (like Arthur Rubinstein, Vladimir Horowitz, Glenn Gould, Sviatoslav Richter and Friedrich Gulda), he spent a large portion of his time presenting young interpreters in the art of piano playing.

Kaiser felt a special connection to the work of Richard Wagner, and supported and accompanied the new beginning of the Bayreuth Festival in 1951 under the direction of Wagner's grandchildren, Wieland and Wolfgang.

Kaiser married the translator and novelist Susanne Kaiser in December 1958. They had two children: the director Henriette Kaiser and the sports editor Philipp Kaiser. He lived in Munich on the edge of the Englischer Garten.

In 2009, he donated his extensive private archive to the Deutsches Literaturarchiv Marbach as a Nachlass (literary estate). Besides letters from Theodor W. Adorno and Alfred Andersch, this archive contained correspondence with Ingeborg Bachmann, Ernst Bloch and Heinrich Böll. In May 2009, Kaiser began answering readers' questions weekly in his video column Kaiser's Classic Customer on the website of SZ-Magazin, which he had to give up two years later due to illness. The series has not been continued since.

Joachim Kaiser died in Munich on 11 May 2017, aged 88.

== Work ==
- Kleines Theatertagebuch. Rowohlt, Reinbek 1965 (with preface: Kritik als Beruf).
- Große Pianisten in unserer Zeit. Piper Verlag, Munich 1965; New edition 1996, ISBN 3-492-22376-1.
- Beethovens 32 Klaviersonaten und ihre Interpreten. S. Fischer, Frankfurt am Main 1975, ISBN 3-10-038601-9.
- Erlebte Musik. Von Bach bis Stravinsky. Hoffmann und Campe, Hamburg 1977, ISBN 3-455-08942-9.
- Erlebte Musik. Teil 2. Von Wagner bis Zimmermann. DTV, Munich 1982, ISBN 3-423-01787-2.
- Mein Name ist Sarastro. Die Gestalten in Mozart's Meisteropern von Alfonso bis Zerlina. Piper, Munich 1984, ISBN 3-492-02818-7.
- Wie ich sie sah … und wie sie waren – Zwölf kleine Porträts. List, Munich 1985, ISBN 3-471-77969-8.
- Erlebte Literatur. Deutsche Schriftsteller in unserer Zeit. Piper, Munich 1988, ISBN 3-492-03048-3.
- Leben mit Wagner. Knaus, Munich 1990; New edition: Siedler, Munich 2013, ISBN 978-3-8275-0028-1.
- „Vieles ist auf Erden zu thun.“ Imaginäre Gespräche (…). Piper, Munich 1991, ISBN 3-492-03490-X.
- Was mir wichtig ist. Deutsche Verlags-Anstalt, Stuttgart 1996, ISBN 3-421-05056-2.
- Kaisers Klassik. 100 Meisterwerke der Musik. Schneekluth, Munich 1997, ISBN 3-7951-1425-X.
- Kaisers Klassik. Da Capo. Schneekluth, Munich 1999, ISBN 3-7951-1732-1.
- Von Wagner bis Walser. Neues zu Literatur und Musik. Pendo, Zürich 1999, ISBN 3-85842-358-0.
- "Ich bin der letzte Mohikaner". (autobiography, with Henriette Kaiser). Ullstein, Munich 2008, ISBN 978-3-550-08697-7.

Catalogue of works

- Gesa Anssar, Gert Rabanus, Helmut Kreuzer: Kaiser-Verzeichnis. Allitera, Munich 2003, ISBN 3-86520-019-2.

=== Lecture series ===
Kaiser's many years of lecturing activity at the Gasteig in Munich include his extensive series of lectures on specific artists and art forms, especially on the subject of music:

- About Ludwig van Beethoven in the 1970s; in Munich (Gymnasium Fürstenried, 60 lectures)
- About Mozart's operas; in the 1990s in Vaterstetten
- About Richard Wagner; i Munich Gasteig (Carl Orff-Hall), from 1989 to 11 May 1993 (63 lectures)
- About Symphony and Sonata between Beethoven, Brahms and Mahler
- The secret of great string quartet – Beethoven and Schubert as creators of classical chamber music works; at the Gasteig in Munich; the series was transferred to "The great late works", from 18 September 2007 to 16 November 2010.

From 11 October 1994 to 17 July 2007 Kaiser gave 206 lectures, totaling 322 lectures. With 170,000 listeners, Kaiser's lectures are considered as some of the most successful to date of the Münchner Volkshochschule.

=== Radio series ===
During weekly radio broadcasts (one hour long, for example "Kaisers Corner" in Bayern4-Klassik), he dealt with Chopin for half a year and with "Beethoven – Werk und Wirkung" for a whole year. In addition to these broadcasts, there were regular word broadcasts, such as "Kaiser's Magazine Show".

== Films ==
- Der letzte Kaiser. TV-Feature, 2008, 5:25 Min., Buch: Peter Gerhardt, Produktion: Hessischer Rundfunk, ttt – titel, thesen, temperamente, First broadcast: 16 November 2008.
- Musik im Fahrtwind. Dokumentarfilm, 2006, 87 Min., Written and directed by Henriette Kaiser, Production: Lemuel Film, First broadcast: 5 November 2006, Bayerischer Rundfunk
- Der Klassik-Kaiser. Dokumentarfilm, 1997, Buch und Regie: Eckhart Schmidt, Production: Raphaela Film GmbH
- In the film Bruckners Entscheidung (1995) by Jan Schmidt-Garre Kaiser played the role of Richard Wagner.

== Awards ==
- 1966: Theodor Wolff Prize
- 1993: Officer's Cross of the Order of Merit of the Federal Republic of Germany
- 1993: Ludwig Börne Prize awarded for the first time
- 1997: Cultural Honor Prize of the City of Munich
- 2001: Hildegard von Bingen Prize for Journalism
- 2004: Julius-Campe-Preis for critics
- 2009: Goldene Ehrenmünze der Landeshauptstadt München
- 2010: Theodor Wolff Prize, for his life's work
- 2013: Distinction of the Medium Magazin, for his life's work
