= Pedro Alcalde =

Spanish composer, conductor, musicologist and pianist

- Born: 1959 (age 66–67)
- Occupation: Spanish composer

Pedro Alcalde (born in Barcelona, 1959) is a Spanish composer, conductor, musicologist and pianist.

== Biography ==
Alcalde was born in Barcelona, where he studied piano, flute, violin and composition and graduated in Philosophy from the University of Barcelona in 1982. He earned a Master of Arts degree from Columbia University in New York in 1984 and a Ph.D. in Musicology and Philosophy from the Free University of Berlin in 1988, with a dissertation on Mozart’s Don Giovanni, directed by Tibor Kneif.

At the Vienna University of Music and Performing Arts he specialized in Orchestral Conducting with Professor Karl Österreicher from 1988 until 1990. From 1990 to 1991, he worked at the Vienna State Opera as assistant to Claudio Abbado and as second conductor in the productions of Don Giovanni, Le nozze di Figaro and Wozzeck, and later for Otello and Elektra at the Salzburg Easter Festival. In 1990, he became Assistant Conductor of the Vienna Philharmonic and from 1991 to 1996 of the Berlin Philharmonic with Claudio Abbado. Since then his career has extensively combined composing and conducting worldwide.

In 1998, Alcalde conducted at the premiere of Prokofiev’s Romeo and Juliet at the Royal Theatre in Madrid with choreography by Nacho Duato for the Spanish National Dance Company (CND). From then until 2010, he served as CND's musical director, conducting a vast musical repertoire ranging from Vivaldi to Stravinsky. For John Malkovich´s directorial film debut, The Dancer Upstairs, Alcalde conducted the music composed by Alberto Iglesias with the Madrid Symphony Orchestra and soloists from the Berlin Philharmonic. The film won the Rota Award for best soundtrack at the 2002 Venice Film Festival . Conducting the Barcelona Symphony Orchestra at the Sónar Festival 2005, Alcalde collaborated with leading artists of electronic music such as Richie Hawtin, DJ/rupture and the rapper and artist Doseone. The second part of the concert offered a new form of visualizing music with the works of Offenhuber-Wenhart and Rachel Reupke. Since 2015 he has conducted each season performances for the Berlin State Ballet at the Berlin State Opera.

As a composer, his artistic career has been devoted mainly to composing music for the performing arts: dance, theatre, film and sound installations. In the last 20 years, Alcalde's compositional work has focused on contemporary dance. His close collaboration with the choreographer Nacho Duato led him to compose twelve ballets performed extensively around the world. His latest for the Berlin State Ballet, Erde , featuring acoustic, electroacoustic and electronic compositions, premiered at the Komische Oper in Berlin in April 2017. Its theme explores the challenges of the Anthropocene. In 2019 Douces/Julia for the Gauthier Dance Company premiered in Stuttgart, Germany and in 2022 Morgen; based on a poem by Dorothy Parker and created for the Compañía Nacional de Danza, at the Palacio de Festivales de Santander and at the Teatro Real in Madrid. He composed Infinito for the Catalan Theatre Company La Fura dels Baus, a work for orchestra and tape based on the myth of Prometheus that premiered as a staged concert at the Roman Theatre in Mérida in 2005. In 2013, he composed the music for act 2 of the multimedia opera El Somni by Franc Aleu and El Celler de Can Roca. This cross-disciplinary work was also presented as an exhibition, a book and a movie. The film premiered at the 65th Berlin International Film Festival in 2014.

His works have been performed throughout the world, at prestigious halls and opera houses like the Berlin State Opera, the Royal Theater in Madrid, the Théâtre du Châtelet in Paris, the Mossovet State Academic Theatre in Moscow, the New York City Center, the Sydney Lyric Theatre and the Gran Teatre del Liceu in Barcelona, among many others.

Alcalde is a founding member of the Nonoprojekt from the Fondazione L'Unione Europea in Berlin, whose aim is inspiring young people to reflect upon the idea of freedom, democracy and tolerance through musical programs. He was Guest Professor of Composition at Barcelona´s Catalonia College of Music (ESMUC) in 2013 and taught at Madrid University Carlos III School of the Arts from 2009 until 2015. Since 2019 he teaches Sound Installation in the Master of Sound Art at the Faculty of Fine Arts of the University of Barcelona, and also at the Accademia di Belle Arti di Roma, where he joined the faculty in 2025.

== Works (selection) ==
Music

- Treblinka (18 Solo Viola Fragments for Yuval Gotlibovich, 2023)

Music for Dance

- Herrumbre (choreography: Nacho Duato, Spanish National Dance Company CND, 2004, Staatsballett Berlin, 2016 and Greek National Opera Ballet, 2019).
- Diecisiete (choreography: Nacho Duato, Spanish National Dance Company CND, 2005).
- Alas (choreography: Nacho Duato, Spanish National Dance Company CND, 2006).
- Hevel (choreography: Nacho Duato, Spanish National Dance Company CND, 2007).
- Cobalto (choreography: Nacho Duato, Spanish National Dance Company CND, 2009).
- Jardín Infinito (choreography: Nacho Duato, Spanish National Dance Company CND, 2010).
- Rust (choreography: Nacho Duato, Martha Graham Dance Company, 2013).
- Depak Ine Final Scene (choreography: Nacho Duato, Martha Graham Dance Company, 2014).
- Static Time (choreography: Nacho Duato, Berlin State Ballet, 2015).
- Erde (choreography: Nacho Duato, Berlin State Ballet, 2017)
- Deuces/Julia (choreography: Nacho Duato, Gauthier Dance, Dance Company Theaterhaus Stuttgart, 2019)
- Morgen; (choreography: Nacho Duato, Spanish National Dance Company CND, 2022

Music for Theatre

- ∞ - Infinito (La Fura dels Baus, 2005).

Music for Film

- Circuit (2010).
- La Distancia (2014).
- Je te tiens (2019).

Interaction Orchestra – Electronic

- FM-2 with Pan Sonic: Vaihtovirta (2004).
- PN-1 with Richie Hawtin: Mind Encode (2005).
- PN-2 with Richie Hawtin: Circles (2005).

Sound Installations

- FM (Barcelona Museum of Contemporary Art MACBA, 2003).
- Immersion (Maritime Museum of Barcelona MMB, 2009).
- Limestone (Limestone Caves, Montserrat Mountain, Barcelona, 2009).
- Maragall´s Room (Palau Moja, Barcelona / National Library of Spain, Madrid, 2011).
- El Somni - Act 2 (Centre d'Art Santa Mònica, Barcelona, 2013).
- Vall d'Hebron (Hospital Vall d'Hebron, Barcelona, 2018).
- Paraíso (IN)habitado (Ayuntamiento de Madrid, Madrid, 2018)
- L'Ange du Méridien (Sónar+D - CCCB, Barcelona, 2020)
