= Amor vien dal destino =

Opera composed by Agostino Steffani

- Opera by Agostino Steffani
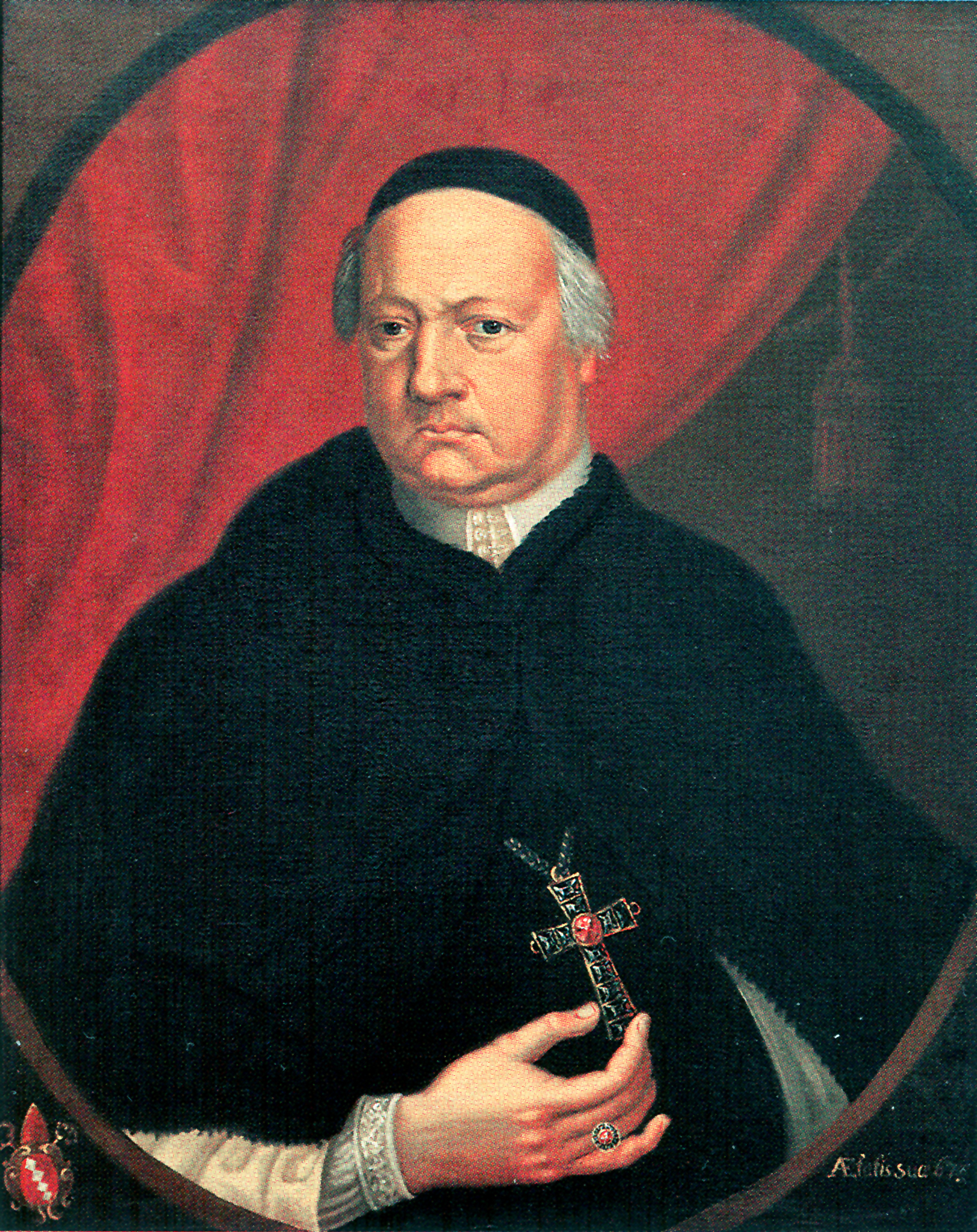
- Steffani portrayed c. 1714
- Librettist: Ortensio Mauro
- Language: Italian
- Based on: Vergil's Aeneid
- Premiere: 1709; Düsseldorf

Amor vien dal destino (Love comes from destiny) is an opera in three acts composed by Agostino Steffani to an Italian libretto by Ortensio Mauro. It is based on an episode from Vergil's Aeneid. It was composed when Steffani was director of music in Hanover, probably in 1693 for the 1694 Carnival celebrations. It was not performed at the time, but premiered in 1709 in Düsseldorf. The opera was revived in concert in Steffani's hometown and New York City in 1981, staged by the Berlin State Opera in 2016, and again by Oper Frankfurt in 2026.

The music has a rich instrumentation, including the pioneering use of chalumeau, and features a great variety of sounds in quick succession. The role of the heroine is unusually written for the alto voice rather than soprano, while the music for her nurse is written in tenor clef.

== History ==
Agostino Steffani had spent 21 years as a composer and later as a diplomat in Munich, but moved to Hanover in 1688 to become Kapellmeister (director of music) there when he was passed over for that post in Munich. The opera's libretto was probably written, as were his other Hanover operas for the new royal theatre in the Leineschloss, by Ortensio Mauro, based on events from Vergil's Aeneid. The opera, probably composed in 1693 and intended for the 1694 Carnival celebrations, was originally entitled Il Turno after a lead character.

The opera was not performed at that time nor during Steffani's remaining tenure in Hanover, where he became increasingly involved in diplomacy and religious duties. In 1703, he moved to Düsseldorf to serve Johann Wilhelm, Elector Palatine, where he was given increasingly important posts: he became general president of the Palatine Government, rector of Heidelberg University, and was appointed Bishop of Spiga. Steffani was absent when Amor vien dal destino premiered in January 1709 in Düsseldorf; the composer was, as Steffani scholar Colin Timms notes, in Rome for several months, mediating "in a dispute between the emperor and the pope", Joseph I, Holy Roman Emperor and Pope Clement XI.

The first revival of the opera was in 1981 a concert production by the Clarion Consort conducted by Newell Jenkens, performed in Steffani's hometown Castelfranco Veneto and at the Lincoln Center in New York City. The opera was first staged in modern time by the Berlin State Opera in 2016. The performances at the Schillertheater were directed by Ingo Kerkhof and conducted by René Jacobs, with the Akademie für Alte Musik Berlin. Steffani died in 1728 in Frankfurt, where the opera was revived by the Oper Frankfurt in 2026, directed by R. B. Schlather and conducted by Václav Luks who also played harpsichord; Margherita Maria Sala appeared as Lavinia.

== Roles ==
The roles in the opera include Greek gods with their names in Italian, characters from the Aeneid and invented characters.

Role	Voice type
Giove (Jove/Jupiter)	alto
Venere (Venus)	soprano
Fauno	bass
Latino, son of Fauno, king of the Latins	bass
Lavinia, Latino's daughter	alto
Giuturna, Latino's daughter	soprano
Nicea, Lavinia's nurse	tenor
Turno, king of the Rutuli	soprano
Coralto, his captain	soprano
Enea, Trojan hero	tenor or soprano
Corebo, his confidant	bass

The noble characters from the Aenaid are juxtaposed with the comic figures of Nicea and Corebo, but both exploring the same themes of "love, power and choice".

== Music ==
Steffani's opera has some pioneering features. In the French overture, a chorus enters to the da capo of the slow part. Unusually, he scored the role of the heroine Lavinia for contralto, while her nurse is a tenor. The instrumentation is rich, written for two trumpets, timpani, two flauti traversi, two oboes, four chalumeau, two bassoons, lute, theorbo, harp and strings. The music is scored for a variety of sounds, such as only a lute accompanying the heroine's first aria, and the sound of the lute remaining with her throughout the piece. Steffani requested four chalumeau, a precursor of the clarinet, in a scene featuring a god, which is the first known use of this instrument in opera. Steffani, a master in writing duets, wrote expressive duets for voices, and also for a voice and an obbligato instrument.
