= Durutte =

Durutte is a surname. Notable people with the surname include:

- Camille Durutte (1803-1881), French composer and music theorist
- Emile Durutte (1817-1886), Belgian nobleman
- Pierre François Joseph Durutte (1767-1827), French revolutionary general
