= Tibor Kneif =

German musicologist

Tiburtius Tibor Kneif (9 October 1932 – 26 July 2016) was a German-Hungarian lawyer and musicologist.

== Life ==
Born in Bratislava, Kneif, who after studying law received his doctorate from the Faculty of Law in Budapest in 1955, continued his studies at the Faculty of Law in Göttingen after emigrating to the Federal Republic of Germany in 1956, but from 1959 he turned his attention to musicology, philosophy and Romance studies and received his doctorate again in 1963, this time with the musicological topic Zur Entstehung der musikalischen Mediävistik with Heinrich Husmann. With a scholarship from the Deutsche Forschungsgemeinschaft he worked at the Frankfurt Institute for Social Research with Theodor W. Adorno from 1965 to 1967. In 1971 he completed his habilitation in musicology under Rudolf Stephan at Freie Universität Berlin and was appointed professor there in 1973 (1997: retired university professor). In addition to his academic profession, he also worked as a music critic, for example for the Göttingen Press between 1959 and 1963 and for the Berlin Tagesspiegel from 1976 to 1984.

Kneif died in Berlin at age 83.

== Writings ==
An extensive list of the writings of Tibor Kneif, compiled by Thomas Gerlich, can be found in the volume Semantische Inseln – Musikalisches Festland. Für Tibor Kneif zum 65. Geburtstag, edited by Hanns-Werner Heister, Hans-Joachim Hinrichsen, Arne Langer, Susanne Oschmann, by Bockel Verlag 1997.

=== Legal Studies ===
- Studien zur Rechtsstellung von staatseigenen Betrieben. Unpublished dissertation in Hungarian language, Budapest 1955
- Die Entwicklung des Verfassungsrechts in Ungarn seit 1945. In Jahrbuch des öffentlichen Rechts. Neue Folge 8, 1959

=== History, sociology and aesthetics of music ===
- Die geschichtlichen und sozialen Voraussetzungen des musikalischen Kitsches. 37, 1963
- Die Erforschung mittelalterlicher Musik in der Romantik und ihr geistesgeschichtlicher Hintergrund. In Acta Musicologica. 36, 1964
- Ernst Bloch und der musikalische Expressionismus. In Ernst Bloch zu Ehren. Beiträge zu seinem Werk. ed. Siegfried Unseld, Frankfurt/M. 1965
- Gegenwartsfragen der Musiksoziologie. Ein Forschungsbericht. In Acta Musicologica 38, 1966
- Der Gegenstand musiksoziologischer Erkenntnis. In Archiv für Musikwissenschaft. 23, 1966
- Das triviale Bewusstsein in der Musik. In Studien zur Trivialmusik des 19. Jahrhunderts. ed. Carl Dahlhaus, Regensburg 1967
- Zur Deutung der Rheintöchter in Wagners „Ring“. In Archiv für Musikwissenschaft 26, 1969
- Die Idee des Organischen bei Richard Wagner. In Das Drama Richard Wagners als musikalisches Kunstwerk. ed. Carl Dahlhaus, Regensburg 1970
- Ideen zu einer dualistischen Musikästhetik. In International Review of the Aesthetics and Sociology of Music. 1, 1970
- Die Idee der Natur in der Musikgeschichte. In Archiv für Musikwissenschaft. 28, 1971; also in Language And Style. III 1970 (Southern Illinois University)
- Musikästhetik. In Einführung in die systematische Musikwissenschaft. ed. Carl Dahlhaus, Cologne 1971
- Musiksoziologie, idem
- Bedeutung, Struktur, Gegenfigur. Zur Theorie des musikalischen Meinens. In International Review of the Aesthetics and Sociology of Music. 2, 1971
- Musiksoziologie. Cologne 1971, 2nd edition. 1975; in Italian as Sociologia della musica. Una introduzione. Fiesole 1981
- Die Bühnenwerke von Leoš Janáček. Vienna 1974
- Typen der Entsprachlichung in der neuen Musik. In Über Musik und Sprache. ed. Rudolf Stephan, Mainz 1974
- Anleitung zum Nichtverstehen eines Klangobjekts. In Musik und Verstehen. Aufsätze zur semiotischen Theorie, Ästhetik und Soziologie der musikalischen Rezeption. Cologne 1974
- Texte zur Musiksoziologie. ed. Tibor Kneif. With a foreword by Carl Dahlhaus, Cologne 1975
- Richard Wagner: Die Kunst und die Revolution; Das Judentum in der Musik; Was ist deutsch? edited and commented by Tibor Kneif, Munich 1975
- Camille Durutte (1803–1881). Ein Beitrag zur französischen Musiktheorie des 19. Jahrhunderts. In Archiv für Musikwissenschaft. 32, 1975
- Musikalische Hermeneutik, musikalische Semiotik. In Beiträge zur musikalischen Hermeneutik. ed. by Carl Dahlhaus, Regensburg 1975
- La musica come simbolo e immagine della realtà sociale. In La sociologia della musica. ed. Antonio Serravezza, Torino 1980
- Ein Plädoyer für Broučeks Freispruch. In Leoš Janáček – Konzeption und Rezeption seines musikdramatischen Schaffens. ed. Walter Bernhart, Salzburg 1997
- Requiem in Messe und Motette. ed. Laurenz Lütteken, Kassel 2002

=== Rock music and jazz ===
- Rockmusik und Subkultur; Rockmusik und Bildungsmusik; Ästhetische und nichtästhetische Wertungskriterien der Rockmusik. In Rockmusik. Aspekte zur Geschichte, Ästhetik, Produktion. ed. Wolfgang Sandner, Mainz 1977
- Sachlexikon Rockmusik. Instrumente, Stile, Techniken, Industrie und Geschichte. Reinbek 1978; revised and extended new edition 1980
- Dass. Revised edition together with Bernward Halbscheffel 1992
- Einführung in die Rockmusik. Entwürfe und Unterlagen für Studium und Unterricht. Wilhelmshaven 1979, 2nd edition 1981
- Rock in den 70ern. Jazzrock, Hardrock, Folkrock und New Wave. ed. Tibor Kneif, Reinbek 1980
- Rockmusik. Ein Handbuch zum kritischen Verständnis. Reinbek 1982
- Exotik im musikalischen Underground. In Europäische Musik zwischen Nationalismus und Exotik. Basler Beiträge zur Musikgeschichte. 4, 1984
