= Jörg Waschinski =

German countertenor

Jörg Waschinski (born 1966 in Berlin) is a German countertenor.

== Selected discography ==
- Carlo Broschi Farinelli: The Composer Jörg Waschinski, Salzburger Hofmusik, Wolfgang Brunner. NCA
