= Henrico Leone =

Opera composed by Agostino Steffani

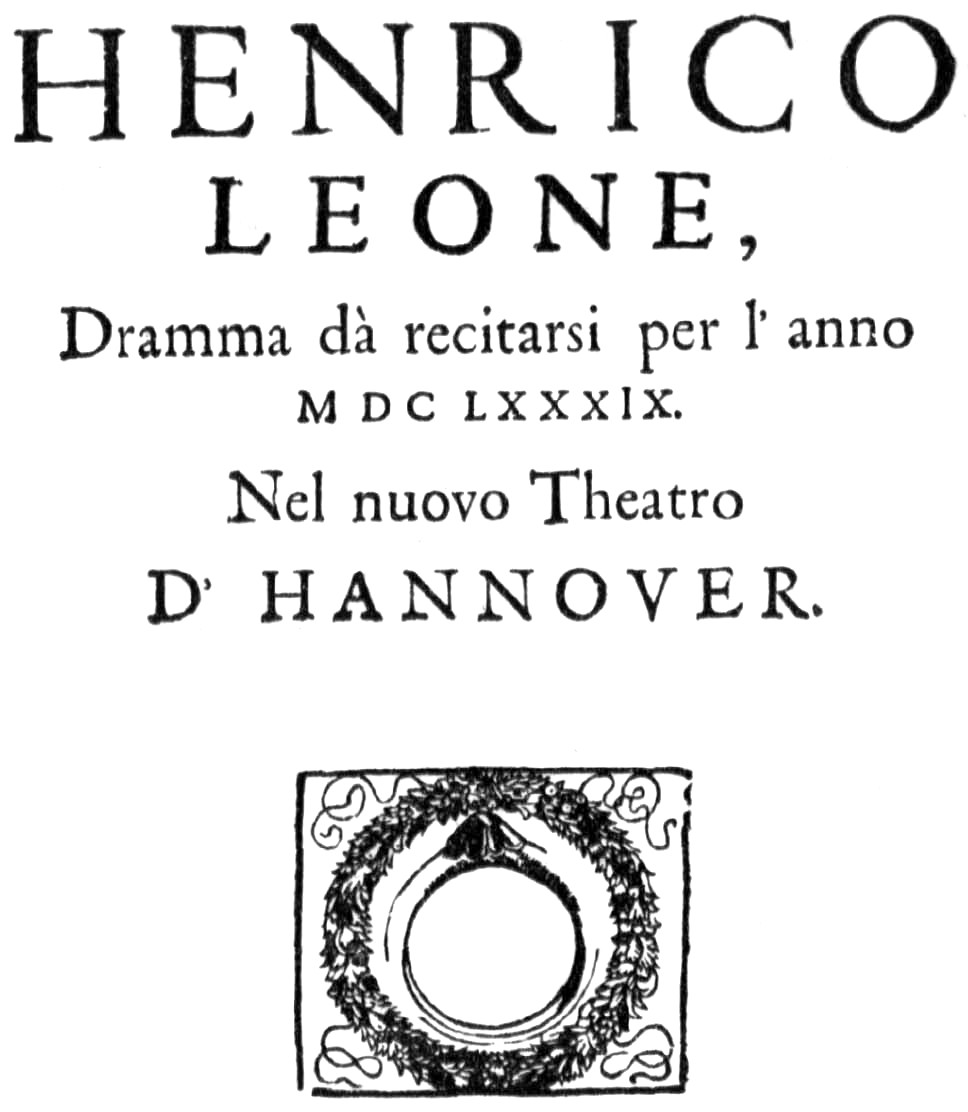
Title page of the libretto published in 1689

Henrico Leone (also Enrico Leone) is an opera (dramma per musica) in three acts composed by Agostino Steffani to an Italian libretto by Ortensio Mauro. Based on the life of the powerful German prince Henry the Lion, the opera was first performed on 30 January 1689 in Hannover to inaugurate the new royal theatre in the Leineschloss (Leine Palace).

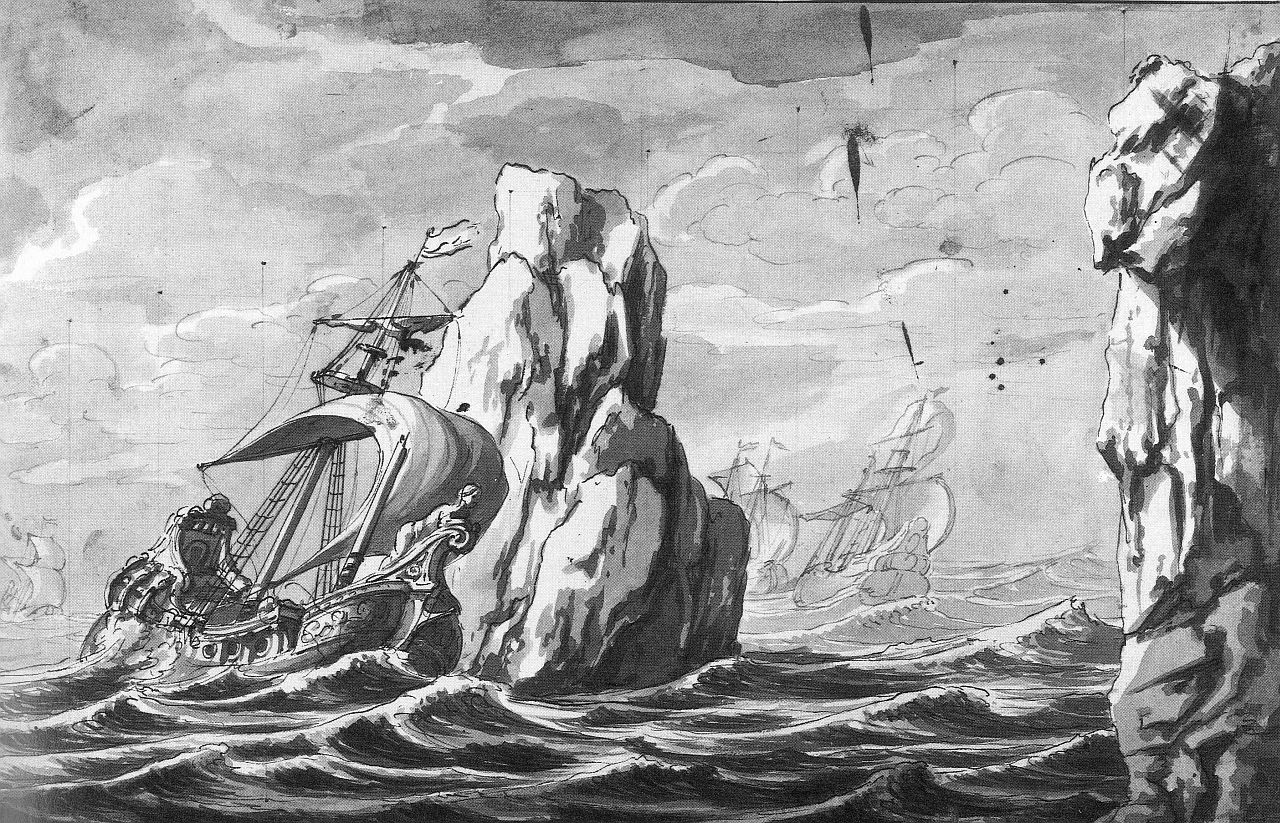
Set design by Johann Oswald Harms, 1696

The opera was performed in German at the Oper am Gänsemarkt in Hamburg in 1696 with sets designed by Johann Oswald Harms, who was inspired by Flemish seascapes. It was also performed in 1697, 1699 and 1716 in Braunschweig, the residence of Henry the Lion, in an arrangement by Georg Caspar Schürmann and a translation by Gottlieb Fiedler.

The opera was revived as Enrico Leone in Hannover in 1989 when it was performed by the Capella Agostino Steffani (today the Hannoversche Hofkapelle) to commemorate the 300th anniversary of the Hannover State Opera and of the composition. In May of that year the ensemble with the same soloists gave a concert performance of the opera at Boston's Jordan Hall as part of the Boston Early Music Festival.

== Recording ==
- Enrico Leone – Capella Agostino Steffani conducted by Lajos Rovatkay; Monika Frimmer (Metilda), Ralf Popken (Enrico), Sabine Szameit (Idalba), Nagashima Yoko (Errea), Carola Guber (Eurillo), Dantes Diwiak (Almaro), Gerhard Faulstich (Ircano/Demone). Released on LP in 1986, reissued on CD in 1995. Label: Calig
