= Bodo Bischoff =

German musicologist and Choral conductor

Bodo Alexander Bischoff (born 24 April 1952) is a German musicologist and Choral conductor.

== Education and career ==
Born in Bielefeld, Bischoff completed the old language learning at the Schadow-Gymnasium in Zehlendorf (Berlin) (Abitur 1971). A study of pedagogy and school music for teacher training, as well as music theory followed (with Friedrich Metzler (Komponist) and Heinrich Poos) and musicology (with Elmar Budde and Hellmut Kühn) at the Berlin University of the Arts. He also studied biology and musicology with Klaus Kropfinger and Rudolf Stephan at the Free University of Berlin. In 1979 he passed his second state examination in school music and biology.

From 1981 to 2019 Bischoff has been a student councilor in the university service at the Musicology Department of the Free University of Berlin. In 1992 he received his doctorate in musicology, and his dissertation dealt with the development of Beethoven's reception of Robert Schumann.

Since 1989 Bischoff has also been active in choir conductor training, both in Berlin and at the Nordkolleg Rendsburg, at the Federal Academy for Cultural Education in Wolfenbüttel and at the music training centres Schloss Zeillern and Schloss Zell an der Pram in Austria.

Since 1992 he has held a teaching position for musicology at the University of Kassel. From the winter semester 1997/98 to the summer semester 1999, he held a deputy professor post for musicology at the University of Kassel and was head of the School Music Department. He was appointed to the Scientific State Examination Office of the University of Kassel and became a member of the commission for the development of a new concept for the amendment of the study courses of school music, applied musicology and music education at the University of Kassel.

== Publications (selection) ==
- Monument für Beethoven. Die Entwicklung der Beethoven-Rezeption Robert Schumanns. Cologne-Rheinkassel: Dohr 1994, ISBN 3-925366-26-1 (simultaneously: dissertation at the Freie Universität Berlin)
- (an co-editor) Klaus Kropfinger: Über Musik im Bilde. Schriften zu Analyse, Ästhetik und Rezeption in Musik und Kunst. 2 volumes. Cologne-Rheinkassel: Dohr 1995, ISBN 3-925366-29-6
