= Henriette Kaiser =

German film director and writer

Henriette Kaiser (born 30 December 1961) is a German writer, film director and journalist.

== Life ==
Born in Munich, Kaiser grew up as the daughter of Susanne and Joachim Kaiser. Even before her Abitur in 1981 she started a classical singing education and finished it in 1983. She then moved to Berlin and studied modern German literature, philosophy and musicology at the TU Berlin . Back in Munich, she began studying at the University of Television and Film Munich in 1988 and graduated in 1997. In 1998 followed her first major direction for the ZDF crime serial Ein Fall für zwei.

Kaiser's first book Schlussakkord (2006) deals with the death of her friend Katja. It received the honorary prize of the Deutscher Hospiz- und PalliativVerband. In her documentary film Musik im Fahrtwind and the accompanying book "Ich bin der letzte Mohikaner" she deals with the biography of her father, the cultural critic Joachim Kaiser.

Kaiser lives in Munich and also works as a journalist. Among other things she writes for the Jüdische Allgemeine and the Bayerischer Rundfunk.

== Work ==
=== Films ===
- 1988: Ödipussi, Regie-Volontariat
- 1997: Roter Tango (Kurzfilm), text and direction, Prädikat wertvoll
- 1998: Ein Fall für zwei (ZDF), direction
- 2000: Mein absolutes Lieblingslied (ZDF)
- 2006: Musik im Fahrtwind (BR), text and direction

=== Books ===
- 2006: Schlussakkord. (Deuticke Verlag, 2008 als TB bei btb, 2014 bei Herder)
- 2008: Ich bin der letzte des Mohikaner. (Ullstein, 2009 als TB bei List)
- 2012: Sprechen wir über Musik (Siedler) coauthor
- 2014: Filme. Macherinnen. (text and criticism) Interviews with 41 media-creative women.
- List of 6 publications in the German National Library.
