= Margherita Maria Sala =

Italian operatic contralto (born 1975)

- Born: Lecco, Italy
- Occupation: Classical contralto

Margherita Maria Sala is an Italian operatic contralto who has appeared internationally in concerts and opera, especially in Baroque operas.

== Career ==
Sala was born in Lecco into a musical family. She received first instructions from her parents. She received violin lessons and trained polyphonic singing with a vocal ensemble formed by family members. She studied choral conducting at the Accademia Biennale in Bellinzona with Marco Berrini, graduating in 2017. She won the Cesti Competition in 2020.

Her roles on stage include the title role of Handel's Oreste, Bradamante in Vivaldi's Orlando furioso, Piacere in Cavalieri's Rappresentatione di anima et di corpo, Speranza in Monteverdi's L'Orfeo, and Galatea in Handel's Aci, Galatea e Polifemo .

She appeared in 2026 as Lavinia in Steffani's Amor vien dal destino at the Oper Frankfurt, directed by R. B. Schlather. a reviewer noted that her dark contralto voice gave the role an almost tenor sonority.
