= Bernd Riede =

Bernd Riede is a German music educator, author of several textbooks and director of studies at the Friedrich-Engels-Gymnasium (Berlin) in the Reinickendorf borough of Berlin.

== Life ==
Riede studied school music, musicology, political science, philosophy and Italian. In 1985 he was awarded a doctorate at the Free University of Berlin with a thesis on Luigi Nono in musicology. He was a teacher and from 1992 to 2018 head of the music department at the Friedrich-Engels-Gymnasium Berlin-Reinickendorf.

Since 1980 he has also been teaching music theory at universities. Since 1993 he has been a member of framework plan commissions several times. His texts for music lessons, especially in the upper school, are used nationwide.

== Publications ==
- Luigi Nonos Kompositionen mit Tonband: Ästhetik des musikalischen Materials - Werkanalysen - Werkverzeichnis. Dissertation. Musikverlag Katzbichler, Munich 1986, ISBN 3-87397-068-6.
- Luigi Nonos politisch engagierte Werke im Musikunterricht heute. In Ulrich Prinz, Bernd Sunten (edit.): Materialien für den Musikunterricht in der Oberstufe. Volume 3: Musik im 20. Jahrhundert. Klett, Schroedel, Stuttgart 1994, ISBN 3-12-178760-8. (online)
- Schadet Musik? - Über einige negative Aspekte der Musik in unserer Gesellschaft. In Universitas 12/1994. Wissenschaftliche Verlagsgesellschaft, Stuttgart 1994.
- with Andreas Otto: Songbuch. Volk und Wissen, Berlin 1997, ISBN 3-06-150521-0.
- Vorbereitung auf das Abitur - Musiktheorie. Manz, Munich 1998, ISBN 3-7863-4400-0.
- Vorbereitung auf das Abitur - Musikgeschichte bis 1900. Manz, Stuttgart 1999, ISBN 3-7863-4401-9.
- Vorbereitung auf das Abitur - Musikgeschichte des 20. Jahrhunderts. Manz, Stuttgart 2000, ISBN 3-7863-4402-7.
- Orbis musicus : für die Oberstufe; wir erfinden Musik. Buchner, Bamberg 2003, ISBN 3-7661-6551-8.
- Orbis musicus (Lehrerband) : für die Oberstufe; wir erfinden Musik. Buchner, Bamberg 2004, ISBN 3-7661-6561-5.
- Songbuch. Cornelsen, Berlin 2012, ISBN 978-3-06-083098-5.
