= Gerhard Croll =

German-Austrian musicologist (1927–2019)

Gerhard Croll (25 May 1927 – 26 October 2019) was a German-Austrian musicologist.

== Life ==
Born in Düsseldorf, Croll studied Kapellmeister at the Robert Schumann Hochschule and musicology with Rudolf Gerber at the University of Münster. He received his doctorate in 1954 with his thesis on Das Motettenwerk von Gaspar van Weerbeke. After his habilitation in 1961, he became involved with the study of the operas of Agostino Steffani.

From 1966 to 1993 he was professor and founding lecturer for musicology at the University of Salzburg. He was co-founder of the musicological institute (Salzburg Music History, Dance and Music Theatre and Bernhard-Paumgartner-Archive). Since 1955 he was a member of the New Mozart Edition. From 1960 to 1990 he was director of the Gluck Complete Edition. In 1986 he founded the International Gluck Society. He was a member of the Central Institute for Mozart research in Salzburg. He was also an honorary member of the Internationale Stiftung Mozarteum.

As a musicologist with practical training, he always combined science and practice. With Bernhard Paumgartner, a much acclaimed performance of an early opera by Emilio de' Cavalieri was given at the Salzburg Festival. He founded the edition series "Monuments of Music in Salzburg" and initiated the recording of several disks with music from Salzburg archives. His research on Salzburg's music history and its lively cultivation was directed not only at Wolfgang Amadeus Mozart but also at Johann Michael Haydn, Heinrich Ignaz Franz Biber, Georg Muffat among others. He encouraged the restoration of valuable local instruments (Salzburg Claviorganum, Haydn grand piano) and contributed significantly to the restoration of the organs on the crossing porticoes in Salzburg Cathedral. Through his personal commitment he was able to acquire a number of important collections and estates (Rudolf Gerber, Bernhard Paumgartner, Friderica Derra de Moroda) for the institute. By taking over the Derra de Moroda Dance Archives, an internationally important foundation stone for dance studies was laid.

The life and work of Christoph Willibald Gluck were the focus of his scientific work. From 1960 to 1990, as head of the Complete Edition and later as director of the Salzburg Gluck Research Centre, he set new accents in Gluck research through numerous publications and music editions. As co-founder of the Gluck Festival in the composer's home region, he rendered great services to the maintenance of Gluck's oeuvre.

The close connection to musical practice was also reflected in his teaching activities and his lifelong contacts with great musical personalities. An intensive professional exchange took place with musicians and conductors such as René Jacobs, Alan Curtis and Diego Fasolis, and open-minded interpreters such as Nikolaus Harnoncourt could be won for lectures on performance practice. The 'Collegium musicum' at the Institute of Musicology, which Croll had directed for many years, offered students the opportunity to explore the subject of their field by making music themselves.

Croll promoted and accompanied the foundation of an ensemble for historical dance at the Institute for Musicology in Salzburg, which, under the long-standing direction of Sibylle Dahms, was dedicated to the practical implementation of dance sources. This enabled in particular the relationship between music and dance from the late 16th century to the 19th century to be researched and put into practice.

Croll died in Salzburg at the age of 92.

== Prizes ==
- 1968: Mozart Medal by the Mozartgemeinde.
- 2017: Citizen medal of the city of Berching
