= Klaus Kropfinger =

German musicologist and art historian (1930–2016)

Klaus Kropfinger (27 May 1930 – 29 June 2016) was a German musicologist and classical pianist.

== Life ==
Born in Gera, Thüringen, Kropfinger studied piano (concert) at the Hochschule für Musik Franz Liszt, Weimar and continued his studies at the universities of Bonn and Cologne in musicology, art history, Romance studies, philosophy and ethnology. His dissertation was a "breakthrough on the way to establishing musical reception research as a serious discipline".

From 1962 to 1966 Kropfinger was a member of the editorial board of the Neue Beethoven-Gesamtausgabe at Beethoven House in Bonn. Until 1972 he worked as a music critic.

From 1973 he was Professor of Musicology at the Freie Universität Berlin for fourteen years. From 1987 he held a chair in musicology at the University of Kassel, where he retired in 1995. In 1989/1990 he was a researcher at the "Getty Center for the History of Art and the Humanities" in Santa Monica.

Kropfinger appeared primarily with publications and editions of Ludwig van Beethoven, Richard Wagner and Luigi Nono.

Kropfinger died in Berlin at the age of 86.

== Publications ==
- Wagner und Beethoven. Untersuchungen zur Beethoven-Rezeption Richard Wagners (Studies on the music history of the 19th century, vol. 29) Regensburg, Bosse 1975.
- Richard Wagner, Oper und Drama, edit. by Klaus Kropfinger, Stuttgart 1984.
- Klaus Kropfinger/Bodo Bischoff: Über Musik im Bilde. Schriften zu Analyse, Ästhetik und Rezeption in Musik und Bildender Kunst. Köln-Rheinkassel : Dohr, 1995.
- Klaus Kropfinger: Beethoven. Kassel, Bärenreiter, 2001. 334 pages. ISBN 3-7618-1621-9.
