= Servio Tullio =

1686 libretto by Agostino Steffani

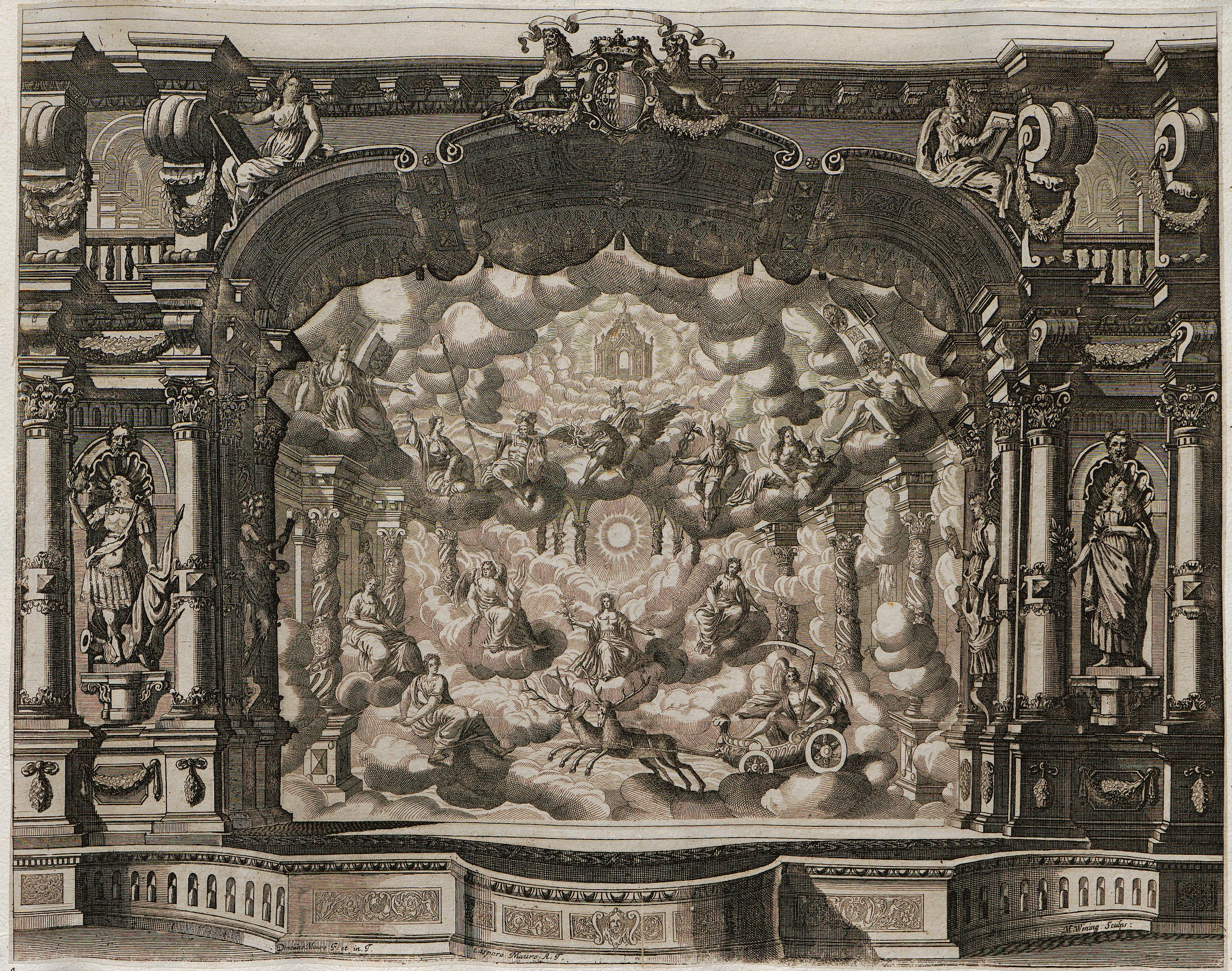
Engraving by Michael Wening for the opera.

Servio Tullio is an opera composed by Agostino Steffani to a libretto by Ventura Terzago based on events in the life of the Roman king Servius Tullius. It was first performed in 1686 in Munich.
