= Johann Oswald Harms =

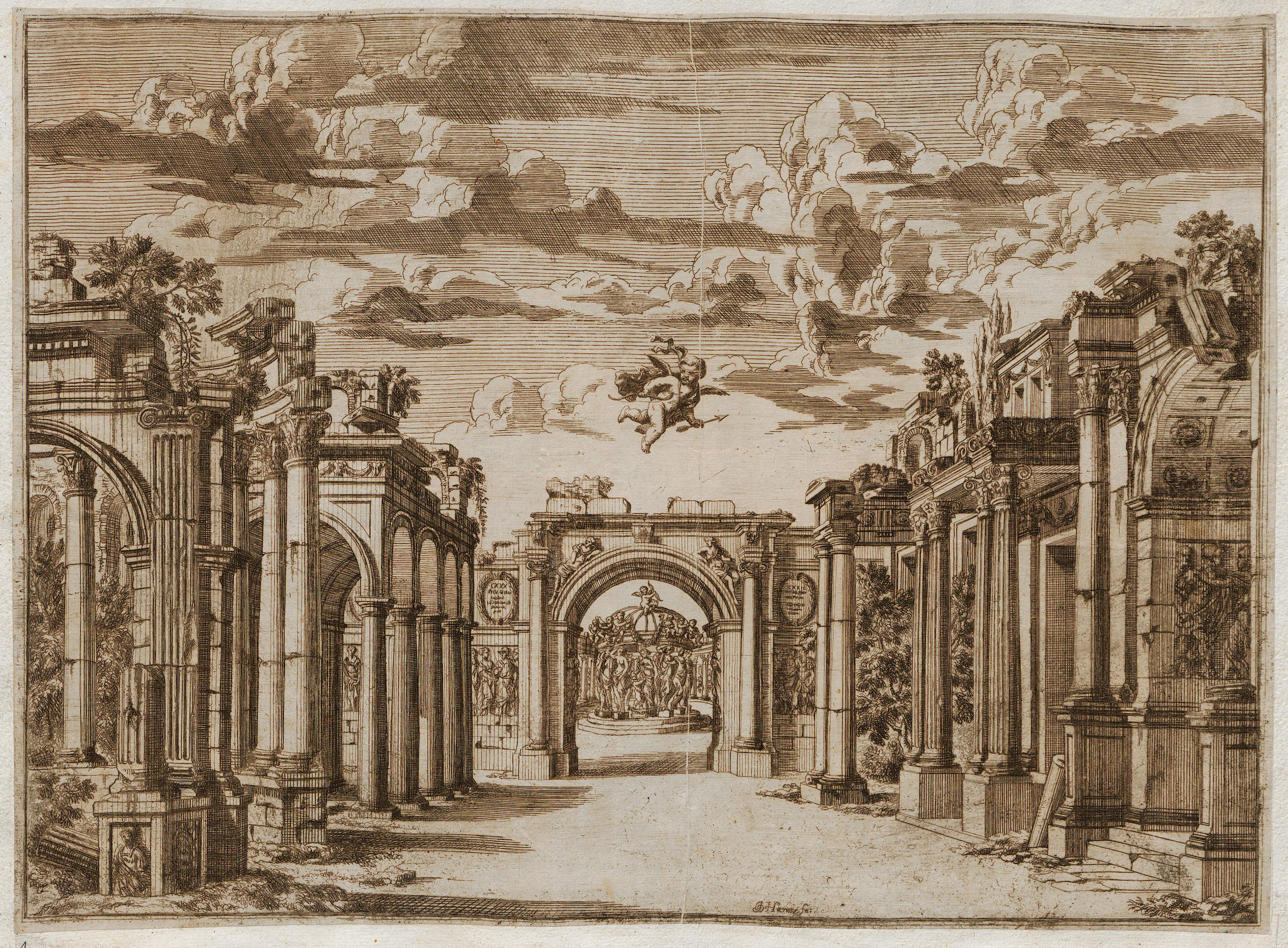
Engraving by Harms, from the Fürstlich Waldecksche Hofbibliothek in Arolsen

Johann Oswald Harms (baptised 30 April 1643 in Hamburg – 1708 in Braunschweig) was a German Baroque painter, engraver, and the first notable stage set designer of the Baroque. He worked for the Opernhaus am Taschenberg in Dresden, painting the ceiling and designing stage sets.

== Works ==
- Collection of etchings of Roman ruins (Alcune invenzione di Rovine et Architetture disegnate e fatte con aqua forte da G.O.H), 1673
- Paintings in the Schlosskirche of Schloss Neu-Augustusburg in Weißenfels, 1682 to 1686
- Ceiling frescoes in Schloss Brüggen
- Painting of the hall of the Hauptkirche St. Jacobi in Hamburg

The Herzog Anton Ulrich Museum in Braunschweig houses his legacy of etchings and stage set designs.

== Literature ==
- Norman-Mathias Pingel: Harms, Johann Oswald. In: Braunschweiger Stadtlexikon. ed. Luitgard Camerer, Manfred R. W. Garzmann and Wolf-Dieter Schuegraf. Braunschweig 1996, ISBN 3-926701-30-7, p. 61.
- Horst-Rüdiger Jarck, Günter Scheel (ed.): Braunschweigisches Biographisches Lexikon. 19. und 20. Jahrhundert. Hannover 1996, pp. 301–302.
- Horst-Rüdiger Jarck, Gerhard Schildt (ed.): Braunschweigische Landesgeschichte. Jahrtausendrückblick einer Region. Braunschweig 2000, pp. 640–642.
- Ferdinand Spehr (1879). "Harms, Johann Oswald". Allgemeine Deutsche Biographie (in German). Vol. 10. Leipzig: Duncker & Humblot. p. 611.
- Johann Schlick (1966). "Harms, Johann Oswald". Neue Deutsche Biographie (in German). Vol. 7. Berlin: Duncker & Humblot. pp. 684–685. (full text online).
