= Agostino Steffani =

Italian composer and diplomat (1654–1728)

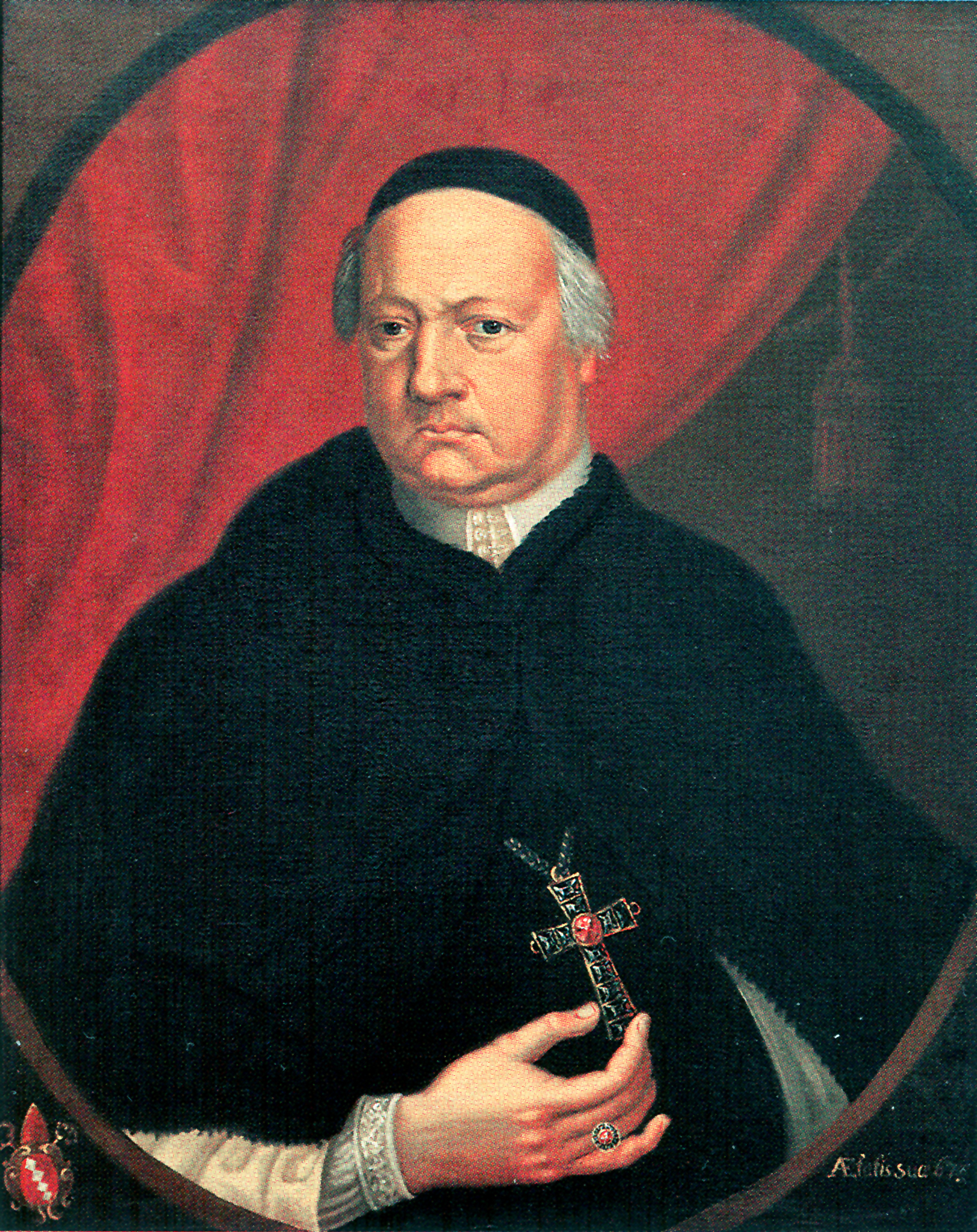
- Portrait of Steffani; by Gerhard Kappers (c. 1714)
- Born: 16 July 1654; Castelfranco Veneto, Republic of Venice
- Died: 12 February 1728 (aged 73); Frankfurt, Holy Roman Empire
- Occupations: Bishop; Diplomat; Composer
- Works: List of compositions

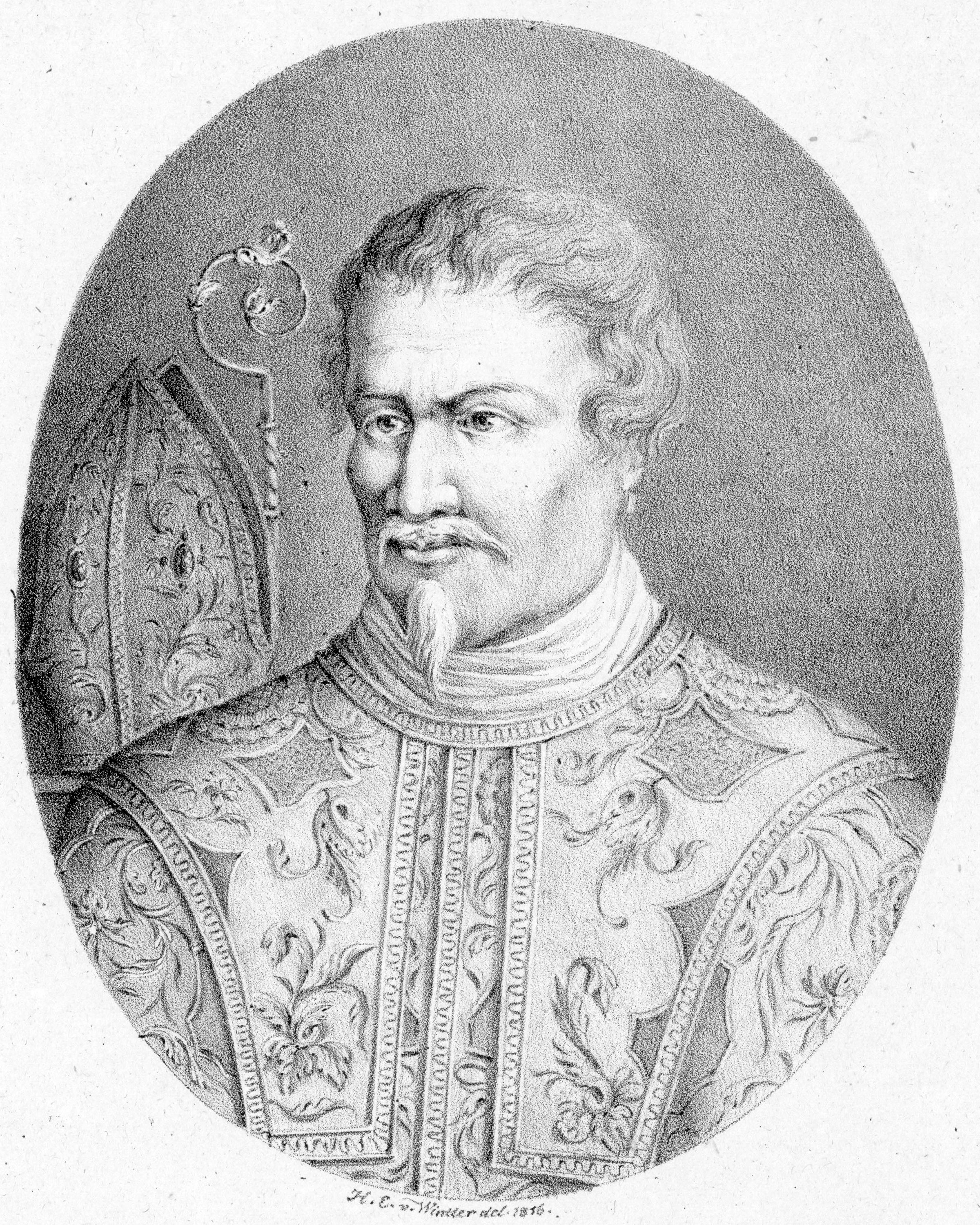
An 1816 lithography of Agostino Steffani from an unknown original.

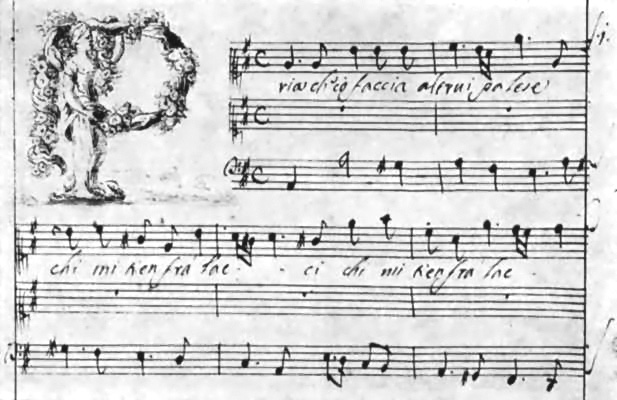
Beginning from the autograph of the Duetto da camera Pria ch'io faccia by Agostino Steffani.

Agostino Steffani (25 July 1654 – 12 February 1728) was an Italian bishop, polymath, diplomat and composer.

== Education ==
Steffani was born at Castelfranco Veneto on 25 July 1654. As a boy he was admitted as a chorister at San Marco, Venice.

Steffani excelled as a choirboy and was asked to sing at important occasions. Aged 11 and 12 he sang opera in Venice. Aged 13 Steffani received patronage and he moved to Munich. Steffani's education was completed at the expense of Ferdinand Maria, Elector of Bavaria, who appointed him Churfürstlicher Kammer- und Hofmusikus and granted him a liberal salary. After receiving instruction from Johann Kaspar Kerll, in whose charge he lived, Steffani was sent in 1673 to study in Rome, where Ercole Bernabei was his master, and among other works he composed six motets, the original manuscripts of which are now in the Fitzwilliam Museum at Cambridge.

On his return to Munich with Bernabei in 1674, Steffani published his first work, Psalmodia vespertina, a part of which was reprinted in Giovanni Battista Martini's Saggio di contrappunto in 1774. In 1675, Steffani was appointed court organist.

== Royal appointments ==
The date when he was ordained priest, with the title of abbot of Lepsing, is not precisely known. His ecclesiastical status did not prevent him from turning his attention to the stage, for which, at different periods of his life, he composed work which exercised a potent influence upon the dramatic music of the period. Of his first opera, Marco Aurelio, written for the carnival and produced at Munich in 1681, the only copy known to exist is a manuscript score preserved in the royal library at Buckingham Palace. It was followed by Solone in 1685, by Audacia e rispetto, Prerogative d'amore, and Servio Tullio in 1686, by Alarico in 1687, and by Niobe, regina di Tebe in 1688.

Notwithstanding the favor shown to him by the Elector Maximilian Emanuel, Steffani accepted in 1688 the appointment of Kapellmeister at the court of Hanover, where he speedily improved an acquaintance dating from 1681 with Ernest Augustus, Duke of Brunswick-Lüneburg (afterwards Elector of Hanover), winning also a pleasant footing with the Elector's daughter Sophia Charlotte (afterwards Electress of Brandenburg and Queen of Prussia), the philosopher Leibniz, the abbot Ortensio Mauro, and many men of letters, and where, in 1710, he showed great kindness to Handel, who was then just entering upon his career. Steffani inaugurated a long series of triumphs in Hanover by composing, for the opening of the new opera house in 1689, an opera called Henrico Leone on Henry the Lion. For the same theatre he composed La Lotta d'Ercole con Achilleo in 1689, La Superbia d'Alessandro in 1690, Orlando generoso in 1691, Le Rivali concordi in 1692, La Liberia contenta in 1693, I trionfi del fato and I Baccanali in 1695, and Briseide (with Pietro Torri) in 1696. The libretto of Briseide is by Francesco Palmieri. Those of most if not all the others are by the abbot Mauro.

The scores are preserved at Buckingham Palace, where, in company with five volumes of songs and three of duets, they form part of the collection brought to England by the Elector of Hanover in 1714, when ascending as King George I of Great Britain. But it was not only as a musician that Steffani distinguished himself in his new home. The elevation of Ernest Augustus to the electorate in 1692 led to difficulties, for the arrangement of which it was necessary that an ambassador should visit the various German courts, armed with a considerable amount of diplomatic power.

== Diplomacy ==
Steffani was sent on this mission in 1696, with the title of envoy extraordinary, after which Pope Innocent XI, in recognition of certain privileges he had secured for the Hanoverian Catholics, consecrated him bishop of Spiga on the Sea of Marmora (modern day Biga in Turkey). Between 1709 and 1723 Steffani served as Vicar Apostolic of Upper and Lower Saxony, a new Roman Catholic diaspora jurisdiction, embracing Upper and Lower Saxon territories.

In 1698, he was sent as ambassador to Brussels, and after the death of Ernest Augustus in the same year he entered the service of the Elector Palatine, John William, at Düsseldorf, where he held the offices of privy councillor and protonotary of the Holy See. To avoid any breach of etiquette that might arise if he continued to produce dramatic compositions, Steffani produced two new operas: Enea at Hanover and Tassilone at Düsseldorf in the name of his secretary and amanuensis Gregorio Piva, whose signature is attached to the scores preserved at Buckingham Palace. Another score, that of Arminio in the same collection, dated Düsseldorf, 1707, and evidently the work of Steffani, bears no composer's name.

Steffani did not accompany the elector George to England, but in 1724 the Academy of Vocal Music in London elected him its honorary president for life. In return for the compliment he sent the association a Stabat Mater, for six voices and orchestra, and three madrigals. The manuscripts of these are still in existence, and the British Library possesses a Confitebor, for three voices and orchestra, of about the same period. All these compositions are in advance of the age in which they were written, and in his operas Steffani shows an appreciation of the demands of the stage, noted as remarkable during a period at which the musical drama was gradually approaching the character of a merely formal concert, with scenery and dresses. But for the manuscripts at Buckingham Palace, these operas would be unknown. Steffani is remembered for his chamber duets, which, like those of his contemporary Carlo Maria Clari (1669–1745), are chiefly written in the form of cantatas for two voices, accompanied by a figured bass. The British Library (Add MS 5055-5056) possesses more than a hundred of these compositions, some of which were published at Munich in 1679. Steffani visited Italy for the last time in 1727, in which year Handel, who always gratefully remembered the kindness he had received from him at Hanover, once more met him at the palace of Cardinal Ottoboni in Rome. This was the last time the two composers met. Steffani returned soon afterwards to Hanover, and died on 12 February 1728 while engaged in the transaction of some diplomatic business at Frankfurt.

== Compositions ==
Steffani stands somewhat apart from contemporary Italian composers (e.g., Alessandro Scarlatti) in his mastery of instrumental forms. His compositions, including opera overtures, show a combination of Italian suavity with a logical conciseness of construction attributable to French influence.

== Works ==
- List of compositions by Agostino Steffani

== In popular culture ==
Donna Leon's 2012 thriller novel, The Jewels of Paradise, uses Steffani's life and works as a background.

== External sources and further reading ==
- Herbermann, Charles, ed. (1913). "Agostino Steffani" . Catholic Encyclopedia. New York: Robert Appleton Company.
- Kautz-Lach, Waltraut Anna (ed.): Agostino Steffani. Musiker, Politiker und Kirchenfürst. Schriften von Gerhard Croll. Vienna: Hollitzer, 2018, ISBN 978-3-99012-491-8
- Lach, Waltraut Anna: Die Operneinakter La Lotta d'Hercole con Acheloo und Baccanali von Agostino Steffani. Wien: Hollitzer, 2019, ISBN 978-3-99012-599-1
- Riemann, Carl Wilhelm Julius Hugo (ed.). Ausgewählte Werke von A. Steffani, etc. (Zweiter (Dritter) Teil ... Herausgegeben von H. Riemann.) 1911, 12 (Denkmaeler. Denkmäler deutscher Tonkunst. ... Zwölfter Jahrgang. ii. Band. 1900, etc. ASIN B0000D28HE. Series: Denkmaeler. Denkmäler deutscher Tonkunst. Zweite Folge. Denkmäler der Tonkunst in Bayern. Elfter Jahrgang. ii. Band. Zwölfter Jahrgang. ii. Band. 1900, etc.
- Timms, Colin (2003). Polymath of the Baroque: Agostino Steffani and His Music. Oxford University Press. ISBN 0195154738.

Scores

- Free scores by Agostino Steffani in the Choral Public Domain Library (ChoralWiki)
- Free scores by Agostino Steffani at the International Music Score Library Project (IMSLP)
- Musical Manuscripts at the Harry Ransom Center

Attribution:
