= New Classical Adventure =

Record label for classical CDs, Hamburg, Germany

New Classical Adventure (NCA) is a classical music record label based in Hamburg, Germany and founded in 1992.
