= Camille Durutte =

French composer and music theorist

François Antoine Camille Durutte, comte Durutte (15 October 1803 – 24 September 1881), was a French composer and music theorist.

== Life ==
Born in Ypres, the son of General Pierre François Joseph Durutte, he was destined for a military career. He studied at the Lycée Louis-le-Grand and then at the École Polytechnique both in Paris from 1823 to 1825. It was only after the death of his father in 1827 that he turned to music.

He conceived a mathematical musical theory based on the work of Josef Hoëné-Wronski and which he presented in his books Esthétique musical (1855) and Technie harmonique (1876). His theories were not very fruitful for musical practice and were only taken up in isolation, for example by Edgar Varèse.

Durutte also composed several operas, religious music and chamber music.

Durutte died in Paris at age 77.

== Works ==
- Esthétique musicale: Technie ou Lois générales du système harmonique. 1855
- Résumé élémentaire de la Technie harmonique et complément de cette Technie. 1876
- Réponse du comte Camille Durutte, d'Ypres, compositeur ... à la prétendue réfutation de son système harmonique, par M.F.-J. Fétis, ... : suivie de L'exposé du principe absolu du rhythme musical et de la sanction physiologique de ce principe.

=== Bibliography ===
- Auguste Prost, « Notice sur le comte Durutte », dans Mémoires de l'Académie de Metz 1881–1882, 1885, p. 171-257 (read online)
