= Carl Dahlhaus =

German musicologist (1928–1989)

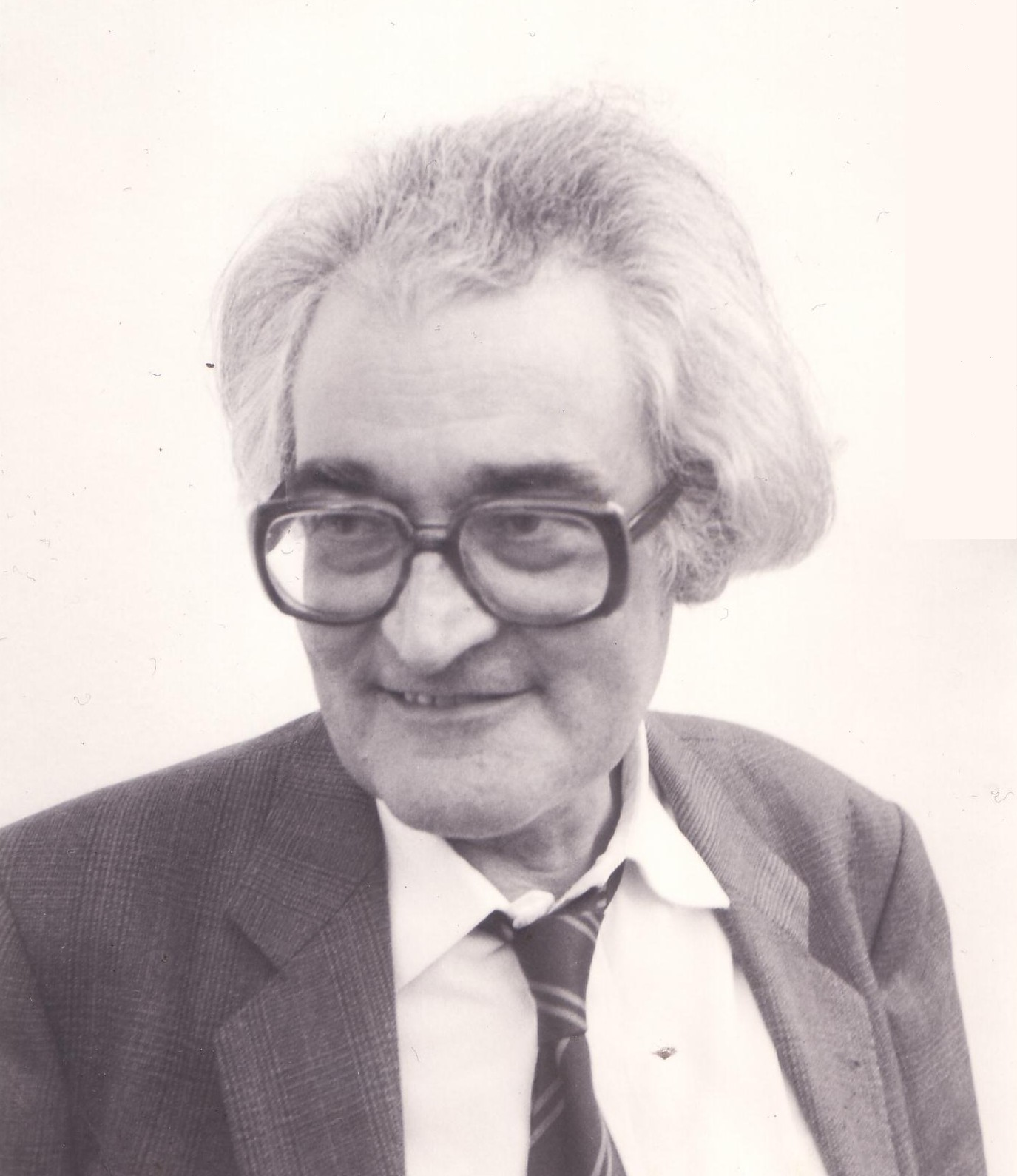
Dahlhaus in 1986

Carl Dahlhaus (10 June 1928 – 13 March 1989) was a German musicologist who was among the leading postwar musicologists of the mid to late 20th-century. A prolific scholar, he had broad interests though his research focused on 19th- and 20th-century classical music, both areas in which he made significant advancements. However, he remains best known in the English-speaking world for his writings on Wagner. Dahlhaus wrote on many other composers, including Josquin, Gesualdo, Bach and Schoenberg.

He spent the bulk of his career as head of Technische Universität Berlin's musicology department, which he raised to an international standard. Dahlhaus pioneered the development of numerous musicological fields, particularly the aesthetics of music, which he raised to a central status. Active as a historian, analyst, editor and organizer, he was massively influential and his work has since incited considerable discussion and debate.

== Life and career ==
Dahlhaus was born in Hanover on 10 June 1928. The Second World War interrupted his early education; he served on the front and as an anti-aircraft auxiliary. He completed school exams through a special program designed for those engaged in combat. After a brief stint studying law, Dahlhaus first engaged in musicology from 1947 to 1952, studying with Wilibald Gurlitt at the University of Freiburg and Rudolf Gerber at the University of Göttingen. His 1953 dissertation at the latter concerned the masses of Josquin des Prez. Instead of seeking an academic career, he engaged in the theatre and journalism worlds. Having begun as a student, he worked as dramaturg for the Deutsches Theater in Göttingen from 1950 to 1958; Bertolt Brecht had encouraged him to take the post. From 1960 to 1962 he worked as musical editor for the Stuttgarter Zeitung newspaper, acting as a relentless promoter of the Darmstadt school.

His first academic position came in 1962, when he served as a research assistant at the University of Kiel until 1966. That year he completed his a work for his Habilitation, Untersuchungen über die Entstehung der harmonischen Tonalität (Studies on the Origin of Harmonic Tonality), published in 1968. The work was a seminal study on the origins of tonality, reaching back to the Renaissance and Baroque periods. Originally in German, Robert Gjerdingen has published a translated version in 1990 through the Princeton University Press. After working at Saarland University for less than a year, he was hired in 1967 to succeed Hans Heinz Stuckenschmidt as the head of the TU Berlin's musicology department. He would remain there until his death, gradually expanding and developing the university's previously minuscule musicology program to one of international renown. Though many universities offered him positions throughout his tenure, he rejected them all; the only exception was the two semesters he spent as a visiting professor at Princeton University.

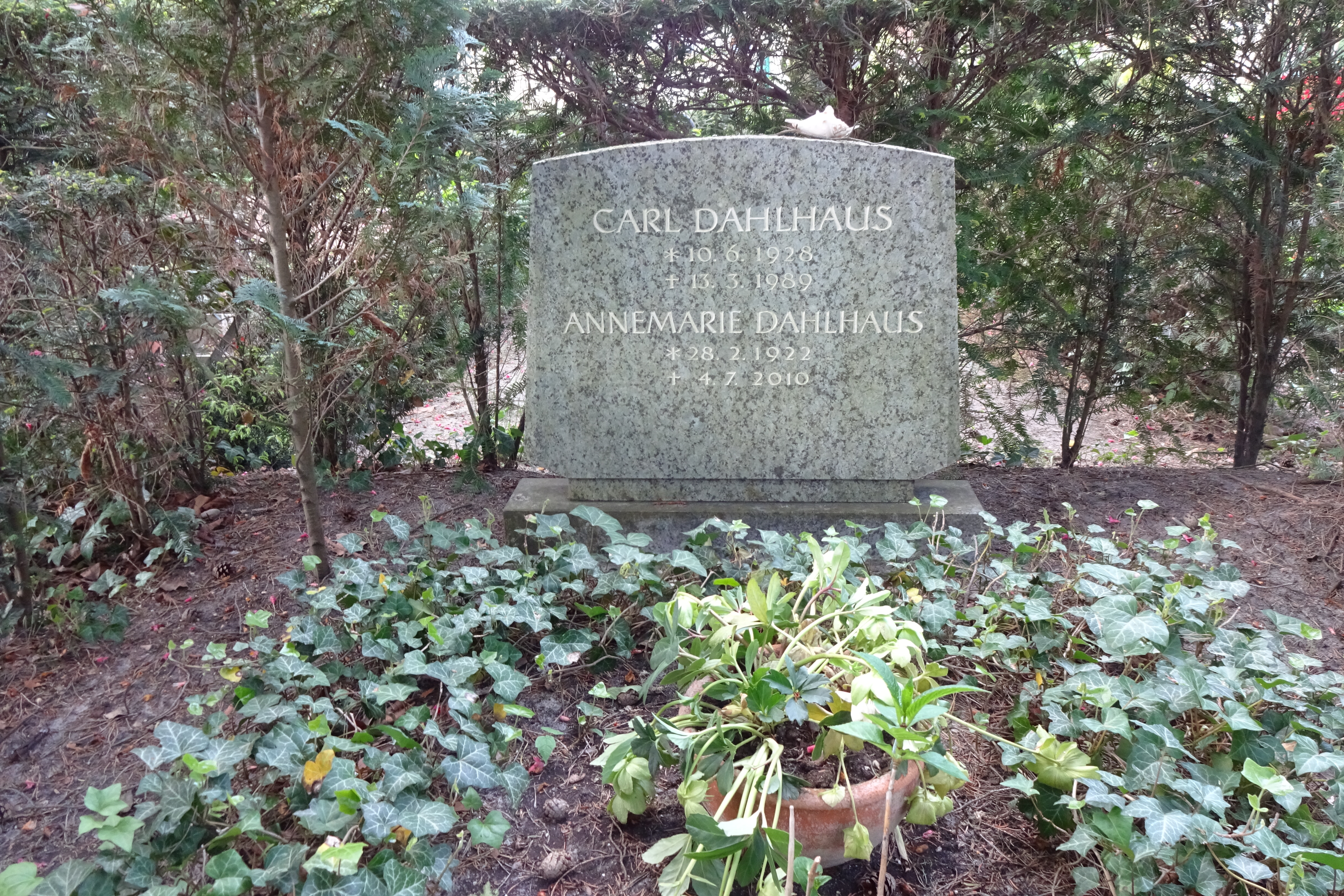
The graves of Dahlhaus and his wife Annemarie in the Evangelischer Kirchhof Nikolassee cemetery.

Dahlhaus was honored with the Order of Merit of the Federal Republic of Germany (Grand Cross with Star), a Blue Max, and accepted into the German Academy. In 1987, he was awarded the Frankfurter Musikpreis.

After being ill for some time, which he mostly kept private from his colleagues, he died in Berlin on 13 March 1989, from kidney failure. He had been working on a succinct history of Western music in English at the time, which was left unfinished.

== Musicological scholarship ==
Dahlhaus wrote 25 books, more than 400 articles, and contributed to 150 other works on a wide range of subjects. The majority of these were on the history of Western music and particularly that of the 19th century, i.e. Romantic music. Composers whose music he wrote on include Josquin, Gesualdo, Bach and Schoenberg. 19th- and 20th-century classical music were also regular topics. All of his major works were written in German; the history of Western music he left incomplete would have been his first English publication.

He was very interested in the work of Richard Wagner and remains best known in the English-speaking world for his writings on Wagner. Other topics he regularly engaged in include music theory, the aesthetics of music, and the prehistory of "new music".

== Legacy ==
Towards the end of his life, Dahlhaus was the most eminent and influential musicologist of his generation, with his works continuing to incite considerable discourse, discussion and controversy. He expressed himself not only as a musicologist, but as a historian, analyst, editor and organizer. His achievements include encouraging new interest in 19th-century music, particularly through his 1989 Nineteenth-Century Music publication.

His diverse interests allowed legitimized various musicological subfields, and broadened the discipline considerably. J. Bradford Robinson gives "systematic musicology, institutional history [and] salon music" as examples of newly accepted topics due to his influence. He was a principal proponent in raising aesthetics as a topic in the forefront of musicology. In addition, he helped establish a coherent narrative for 20th-century classical music.

== Selected bibliography ==
- Dahlhaus, Carl. 1979. Richard Wagner's Music Dramas. Translated by Mary Whittall. Cambridge & New York: Cambridge University Press.
- ———. 1980. Between Romanticism and Modernism: Four Studies in the Music of the Later Nineteenth Century. Translated by Mary Whittall. Berkeley: University of California Press.
- ———. 1982. Esthetics of music. Translated by William W. Austin. Cambridge & New York: Cambridge University Press.
- ———. 1983a. Analysis and Value Judgement. Translated from the German by Siegmund Levarie. New York: Pendragon Press.
- ———. 1983b. Foundations of Music History. Translated by J. B. Robinson. Cambridge & New York: Cambridge University Press.
- ———. 1985. Realism in nineteenth-century music. Translated by Mary Whittall. Cambridge & New York: Cambridge University Press.
- ———. 1987. Schoenberg and the New Music: Essays. Translated by Derrick Puffett and Alfred Clayton. Cambridge & New York: Cambridge University Press.
- ———. 1989. Nineteenth-Century Music. English translation by J. Bradford Robinson. Berkeley: University of California Press.
- ———. 1989. The Idea of Absolute Music. Translated by Roger Lustig. Chicago: University of Chicago Press.
- ———. 1990. Studies on the Origin of Harmonic Tonality. Translated by Robert O. Gjerdingen. Princeton, NJ : Princeton University Press.
- ———. 1991. Ludwig van Beethoven: Approaches to His Music. Translated by Mary Whittall. Oxford: Clarendon Press; New York: Oxford University Press.
- Deathridge, John, and Carl Dahlhaus. 1984. The New Grove Wagner. New York: W. W. Norton.
- Ruth Katz and Carl Dahlhaus (1987–1991): Contemplating Music (Sources in the aesthetic of music, selected, edited, annotated and introduced, with original translations, in four volumes), New York: Pendragon Press. Vol. I Substance (1987); Vol. II Import (1989); Vol. III Essence (1991); Vol. IV Community of Discourse (1991).

== Sources ==
- Hepokoski, James (Spring 1991). "The Dahlhaus Project and Its Extra-Musicological Sources". 19th-Century Music. 14 (3). University of California Press: 221–246. doi:10.2307/746536. JSTOR 746536.
- Linfield, Eva (Autumn 1992). "Reviewed Work: Studies on the Origin of Harmonic Tonality by Carl Dahlhaus, Robert O. Gjerdingen". Journal of Music Theory. 36 (2). Duke University Press: 389–400. JSTOR 843936.
- Robinson, J. Bradford (2001). "Dahlhaus, Carl". Grove Music Online. Oxford: Oxford University Press. doi:10.1093/gmo/9781561592630.article.07055. ISBN 978-1-56159-263-0. (subscription, Wikilibrary access, or UK public library membership required)
- Wintle, Christopher (October 1982). "Review: Issues in Dahlhaus". Music Analysis. 1 (3). Wiley: 341–355. doi:10.2307/854179. JSTOR 854179.
- "The Shoulders on Which We Stand: Carl Dahlhaus (1928-1989)". Technische Universität Berlin. Archived from the original on 21 May 2013.
