= Ortensio Mauro =

Italian writer

(Bartolomeo) Ortensio Mauro (1632/33 – 1725) was a writer and librettist.

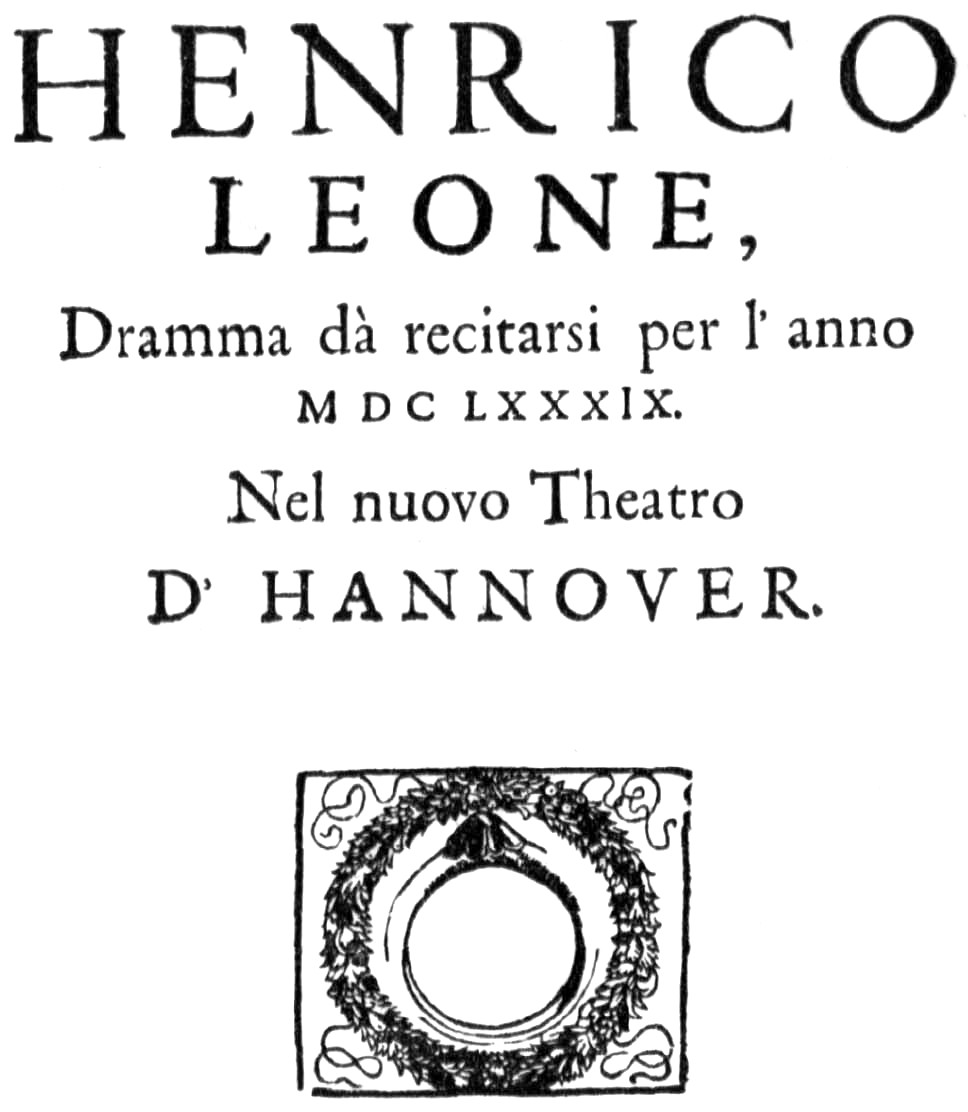

He was born in 1632 or 1633 in Padua, Republic of Venice, where he studied literature at the university. He entered the service of the family of the Elector of Hanover as Italian secretary and eventually became attached to the court of Sophia, Electress of Hanover. Mauro wrote poetry, occasionally served the royal family as a diplomat and wrote the libretti for eight operas by fellow Italian, composer Agostino Steffani including Henrico Leone, an opera written to inaugurate the new court theatre in Hanover in 1689. His opera La superbia d'Alessandro was the basis for the libretto of George Frederic Handel's opera Alessandro.
