= Rudolf Gerber =

German musicologist (1899–1957)

Rudolf Gerber (15 April 1899 – 6 May 1957) was a German musicologist. He was professor and director of the musicology department of the University of Gießen and from 1943 professor of musicology at the University of Göttingen.

== Life ==
Born in Flehingen, Gerber, son of the tax secretary Michael Gerber and his wife Friederike, née Streib, already received violin lessons at the Munzsche Konservatorium during his school days in Karlsruhe in the period from 1910 to 1917. From 1918 to 1922 he studied musicology with Hermann Abert, art history with Wilhelm Waetzold and Wilhelm Pinder and philosophy with Johannes Volkelt, F. Krüger and Driesch at the University of Halle and the University of Leipzig. In 1922 Gerber became a doctor with a thesis on The aria in the operas J. A. Hasses. Subsequently, he was assistant at the Music History Department of the Humboldt University of Berlin until 1928.

After he habilitated at the Justus Liebig University Giessen in 1928, he became an extraordinary professor there in 1932. From 1933 to 1935, he taught at the Johann-Wolfgang-Goethe-Universität Frankfurt am Main, and since 1938 was also a lecturer for church music at the local conservatory. From 1937 to 1943 he was a scheduled extraordinary professor for musicology at the Justus-Liebig-Universität Gießen. In 1952 he was elected a full member of the Akademie der Wissenschaften zu Göttingen.

Gerber, who had already appeared in Nazi Germany in 1935 with an essay on the Aufgaben der Musikwissenschaft im Dritten Reich in the Neue Zeitschrift für Musik, was admitted to the NSDAP on 17 October 1937, retroactively as of 1 May 1937, and received the membership number 5.863.193.

At the musicological conference within the framework of the Reichsmusiktage on 26 May 1938 he gave a lecture on Volkstum und Rasse in der Persönlichkeit und Kunst von Johannes Brahms. In 1939/40 an anti-Semitic contribution by Gerber appeared in the Zeitschrift für deutsche Geisteswissenschaft under the title "Die Musik der Ostmark", in which he claimed, among other things

At the end of the last century, another generation was given the reins, whose spokesmen were no longer people of the Ostmark, but Weltjudentum (International Judaism), whose first main representative, the Czech ghetto Jew Gustav Mahler, ushered in an era of external and internal decay.

Gerber worked closely with Herbert Gerigk, who was able to win him for a music encyclopaedia as part of the planned Hohe Schule der NSDAP. Gerber wrote in his acceptance of 3 March 1940 that he could take over the entire Protestant church music from Luther to Bach, as well as the Italian opera of the 18th century, the music of the 15th century and perhaps also the polyphonic music of the Middle Ages.

In the context of his work at the Hauptstelle Musik des Beauftragten des Führers für die Überwachung der gesamten geistigen und weltanschaulichen Schulung und Erziehung der NSDAP (Amt Rosenberg), which was headed by Herbert Gerigk, he was a staff member of Alfred Rosenberg's magazine Musik im Kriege. In 1942, Gerber stayed in Paris from the end of October to the beginning of November as an employee of the Reichsleiter Rosenberg Taskforce "on behalf of the Hohe Schule" of the NSDAP, in order to collect material for an extensive study on the influence of German musicians on French musical culture.

In his self-portrayal in Die Musik in Geschichte und Gegenwart volume 4, 1955, he concealed his activities for the NSDAP and only mentioned that he had been a member of the Akademie gemeinnütziger Wissenschaften zu Erfurt and from 1952 member of the Academy of sciences in Göttingen war.

Gerber died in Göttingen at age 58.

== Work ==
- Der Operntypus J. A. Hasses und seine textlichen Grundlagen, Leipzig 1925
- Das Passionsrezitativ bei Heinrich Schütz und seine stilgeschichtlichen Grundlagen, Gütersloh 1929
- Guillaume Dufay: Sämtliche Hymnen [Guillaume Dufay: Complete Hymns]. Das Chorwerk. Vol. 49. Wolfenbüttel: Möseler Verlag. 1937. OCLC 917168.
- Johannes Brahms, Potsdam 1938
- Christoph Willibald Gluck, Potsdam 1941, 2nd extended edition 1950.
- Christoph Willibald Gluck. Akademische Verlagsgesellschaft Athenaion, Munich, 1950
- Bachs Brandenburgische Konzerte: Eine Einführung in ihre formale und geistige Wesensart. Bärenreiter-Verlag, Kassel, Basel, 1951
- Zur Geschichte des mehrstimmigen Hymnus: Gesammelte Aufsätze. Bärenreiter-Verlag, Kassel, Basel, Paris, London, New York, 1965
