= Ich will den Kreuzstab gerne tragen, BWV 56 discography =

This is a list of recordings of Bach's cantata Ich will den Kreuzstab gerne tragen, BWV 56, a solo cantata for bass or bass-baritone composed for the 19th Sunday after Trinity, first performed on 29 October 1726. In English, it is commonly referred to as the Kreuzstab cantata.

The cantata was recorded as part of some complete and other incomplete series of recordings of Bach's church cantatas. As a solo cantata with expressive music, it has attracted singers outside Bach specialists. It has then often been coupled with another bass solo cantata, Ich habe genug, BWV 82, a paraphrase of the Song of Simeon.

== Cantata ==
Bach composed the church cantata for the 19th Sunday after Trinity, Ich will den Kreuzstab gerne tragen, BWV 56, as a solo cantata for bass. It is one of few works that he called a cantata. He led the first performance on 29 October 1726.

== Recordings ==
According to musicologist Martin Elste, the most frequently recorded cantatas of Bach have been the virtuoso solo cantatas Jauchzet Gott in allen Landen, BWV 50 for soprano and obbligato trumpet, Ich habe genug, BWV 82 for bass (with alternative versions for soprano, alto or mezzo-soprano) and the so-called "Kreuzstab cantata" for solo bass or bass-baritone Ich will den Kreuzstab gerne tragen, BWV 56. To these two rewarding choral cantatas should be added: Christ lag in Todes Banden, BWV 4 and the Actus tragicus, BWV 106. The Kreuzstab cantata has been recorded either separately, for example as a selection of Fritz Werner's recordings, or as complete recordings of Bach's sacred cantatas BWV 1–200. As a vocally demanding and expressive Bach cantata, it has often attracted recordings by soloists drawn from the broader world of opera and lieder singers. It is regularly coupled with Ich habe genug, BWV 82, a paraphrase of the Song of Simeon, and an impassioned cantata taking longing for death as its theme. A third work for bass has sometimes been included, the fragmentary cantata Der Friede sei mit dir, BWV 158, related to peace (Friede).

=== History ===
==== Bass solo cantatas ====
The earliest extant recording was a live concert performance, broadcast in 1939, by Texas-born baritone Mack Harrell with Eduard van Beinum conducting the Concertgebouw Orchestra: it showed a similar large-scale approach to Bach as Willem Mengelberg, van Beinum's predecessor. There was a second recording in 1958 by Harrell at St. Paul’s Episcopal Church, Cleveland, directed by Robert Shaw with the RCA Victor Orchestra and Choir. For that later recording, Jonathan Woolf writes: "Mack was seemingly the most instinctively noble of singers. There is an unselfconscious gravity in his singing but never one that elides into the statuesque."

As a result of mentoring by Harrell at Aspen and then Juilliard School, New York, Kansas-born baritone Barry McDaniel moved to Germany as a Fulbright Scholar, eventually becoming a permanent member of the Deutsche Oper in Berlin, where he acquired the former villa of Third Reich architect Albert Speer near Großer Wannsee. In 1964, at the height of his career, he recorded the Kreuzstab cantata with Fritz Werner, the Pforzheim Chamber Orchestra and Heinrich-Schütz-Chor Heilbronn; taking wide-spanning melismas in a single breath, McDaniel's dignified yet emotional rendition has been rated by Jonathan Freeman-Attwood of Gramophone as being in a league of its own.

In 1950–51, 26-year-old Dietrich Fischer-Dieskau featured as soloist in the cantata as part of Karl Ristenpart's project to record all Bach church cantatas with the RIAS Kammerchor and its orchestra, broadcast live by radio in church services. Ristenpart used small ensembles compared to other groups at that period. The project was never completed and in particular omitted Ich habe genug, BWV 82.

In 1977, Max van Egmond was the soloist in a recording of BWV 56 coupled with BWV 82, with oboist Paul Dombrecht and conductor Frans Brüggen. Peter Kooy and oboist Marcel Ponseele were the soloists for a recording of the two cantatas and BWV 158, with Philippe Herreweghe conducting Choir and Orchestra of La Chapelle Royale. In 1997, there was also a live video recording with Klaus Mertens and oboist Marcel Ponseele, directed from the keyboard by Ton Koopman with the Amsterdam Baroque Orchestra & Choir.

==== Complete series of Bach's church cantatas ====
In the series of church cantatas for Telefunken, known as the Teldec series, shared by Nikolaus Harnoncourt and Gustav Leonhardt in their pursuit in historically informed performances with all-male singers and period instruments, the Cross-staff cantata was recorded in 1976 by Michael Schopper, the Knabenchor Hannover and the Leonhardt-Consort, conducted by Leonhardt.

Helmuth Rilling, who recorded all Bach cantatas from 1969 to 1985, recorded the cantata in 1983, with Fischer-Dieskau, the Gächinger Kantorei and Bach-Collegium Stuttgart.

Pieter Jan Leusink conducted all Bach church cantatas with the Holland Boys Choir and the Netherlands Bach Collegium in historically informed performance, however with women for the solo soprano parts. He completed the project within a year on the occasion of the Bach Year 2000. A reviewer from Gramophone noted: "Leusink's success elsewhere comes largely through his admirably well-judged feeling for tempos and a means of accentuation which drives the music forward inexorably". He recorded the cantata in 1999 with his regular bass Bas Ramselaar.

Masaaki Suzuki, who studied historically informed practice in Europe, began recording Bach's church cantatas with the Bach Collegium Japan in 1999, at first not aiming at a complete cycle, but completing all in 2017. They recorded the cantata in 2005, with Peter Kooy as the singer.

Sigiswald Kuijken recorded a series of church cantatas, combined by their liturgical function, with the ensemble La Petite Bande, with vocalists singing one voice per part (OVPP). They recorded the cantata in 2006, with singer Dominik Wörner.

=== Table of recordings ===
The following table is derived mostly from the listings on the Bach Cantatas website. The table lists the recording's title in the first column, conductor, choirs (for the closing chorale) and orchestra in the second column, the bass soloist in the third (along with the oboist where credited), the label in the fourth, and the year (normally of release) in the sixth column. A seventh column marks if a choir performs with one voice per part (OVPP), and an eighth column shows if the ensemble plays period instruments in historically informed performance.

Recordings of Ich will den Kreuzstab gerne tragen, BWV 56
Title	Conductor / Choir / Orchestra	Soloists	Label	Year	Choir type	Instr.
Eduard van Beinum and the Concertgebouw Orchestra: Live Radio Recordings, Vol. 1	Eduard van Beinum Unknown Concertgebouw Orchestra	Mack Harrell	Decca	1939		
Johann Sebastian Bach: Kantaten BWV 164, 47, 56	Karl Ristenpart RIAS Kammerchor RIAS Kammerorchester	Dietrich Fischer-Dieskau; Hermann Töttcher (ob)	Archiv	1950–51		
J. S. Bach: Cantatas BWV 56, 82	Robert Shaw RCA Victor Orchestra and Chorus	Mack Harrell; Marc Lifschey (ob)	RCA Victor	1958		
Johann Sebastian Bach: Kantaten BWV 54, 56, 82	Kurt Thomas Thomanerchor Leipzig Gewandhaus Orchestra	Hermann Prey; Willy Garlach (ob)	EMI Electrola	1959		
J. S. Bach: Cantatas Nos. 56, 82	Neville Marriner St Anthony Singers Academy of St Martin-in-the-Fields	John Shirley-Quirk; John Roger Lord (ob)	Decca	1964		
Les Grandes Cantates de J. S. Bach Vol. 18	Fritz Werner Heinrich-Schütz-Chor Heilbronn Pforzheim Chamber Orchestra	Barry McDaniel; Pierre Pierlot (ob)	Erato	1964		
J. S. Bach: Das Kantatenwerk • Complete Cantatas • Les Cantates, Folge / Vol. 14	Gustav Leonhardt Knabenchor Hannover Leonhardt-Consort	Michael Schopper; Ku Ebbinge (ob)	Teldec	1976		Period
Kreuzstab & Ich Habe Genug	Frans Brüggen	Max van Egmond; Paul Dombrecht (ob)	Sony	1977		Period
Die Bach Kantate Vol. 4	Helmuth Rilling Gächinger Kantorei Bach-Collegium Stuttgart	Dietrich Fischer-Dieskau; Günther Passin (ob)	Hänssler	1983		
Wachet auf! Bach: Cantatas 56 and 140; Motet BWV Anh. 159	Greg Funfgeld Bach Choir of Bethlehem Bach Festival Orchestra	Daniel Lichti; James Mason (ob)	Dorian Recordings	1989		
J.S. Bach: Solokantaten Kreuzstabkantate BWV 56; "Der Friede sei mit dir" BWV 158; "Ich habe genug" BWV 82	Karl-Friedrich Beringer Windsbacher Knabenchor Consortium Musicum	Siegmund Nimsgern; Günther Passin (ob)	Baier Records	1991		
Cantates pour Basse – Cantatas for Solo Bass (BWV 56, 82, 158)	Philippe Herreweghe Choir and Orchestra of La Chapelle Royale	Peter Kooy; Marcel Ponseele (ob)	Harmonia Mundi France	1991		Period
Cantatas BWV 56, 82	Joshua Rifkin The Bach Ensemble	Jan Opalach; Stephen Hammer (ob)	L'Oiseau-lyre	1991	OVPP	Period
Bach Cantatas: BWV 82, 158 and 56	Roger Norrington Salzburger Bachchor Camerata Academica Salzburg	Matthias Goerne; Albrecht Mayer (ob)	Decca Records	1999		Period
Bach Edition Vol. 4 – Cantatas Vol. 1	Pieter Jan Leusink Holland Boys Choir Netherlands Bach Collegium	Bas Ramselaar	Brilliant Classics	1999		Period
Bach Cantatas Vol. 10: Potsdam / Wittenberg / For the 19th Sunday after Trinity	John Eliot Gardiner Monteverdi Choir English Baroque Soloists	Peter Harvey	Archiv Produktion	2000		Period
J. S. Bach: Complete Cantatas Vol. 17	Ton Koopman Amsterdam Baroque Orchestra & Choir	Klaus Mertens; Alfredo Bernardini (ob)	Antoine Marchand	2001		Period
J. S. Bach: Kantaten · Cantatas BWV 82, BWV 158, BWV 56	Rainer Kussmaul Members of RIAS Kammerchor Berliner Barock Solisten	Thomas Quasthoff; Albrecht Mayer (ob)	Deutsche Grammophon	2004		
J.S. Bach: Cantatas Vol. 41 (Solo Cantatas) – BWV 56, 82, 84, 158	Masaaki Suzuki Bach Collegium Japan	Peter Kooy	BIS	2005	OVPP	Period
J. S. Bach: Kantaten · Cantatas BWV 82, BWV 158, BWV 56	Michael Schneider Thomanerchor La Stagione	Gotthold Schwarz	Capriccio	2006		Period
J. S. Bach: Cantatas for the Complete Liturgical Year Vol. 1 Cantatas BWV 55, 56, 98, 180	Sigiswald Kuijken La Petite Bande	Dominik Wörner	Accent	2006	OVPP	Period
Bach Cantatas for Bass BWV 82/158/56/203	Ryo Terakado il Gardellino	Dominik Wörner; Marcel Ponseele (ob)	Passacaille	2013		Period
Matthias Goerne – Bach Cantatas for Bass	Gottfried von der Goltz Freiburger Barockorchester	Matthias Goerne; Katharina Arfken (ob)	Harmonia Mundi	2017		Period
Johann Sebastian Bach: Cantatas for bass. Stephan McLeod, Gli Angeli Genève	Stephan MacLeod Gli Angeli Genève	Stephan MacLeod; Emmanuel Laporte (ob)	Claves 50-3049	2022		Period
