= Ich habe genug, BWV 82 =

Church cantata by Johann Sebastian Bach

Ich habe genug
- BWV: 82; 82a
- Solo church cantata by J. S. Bach
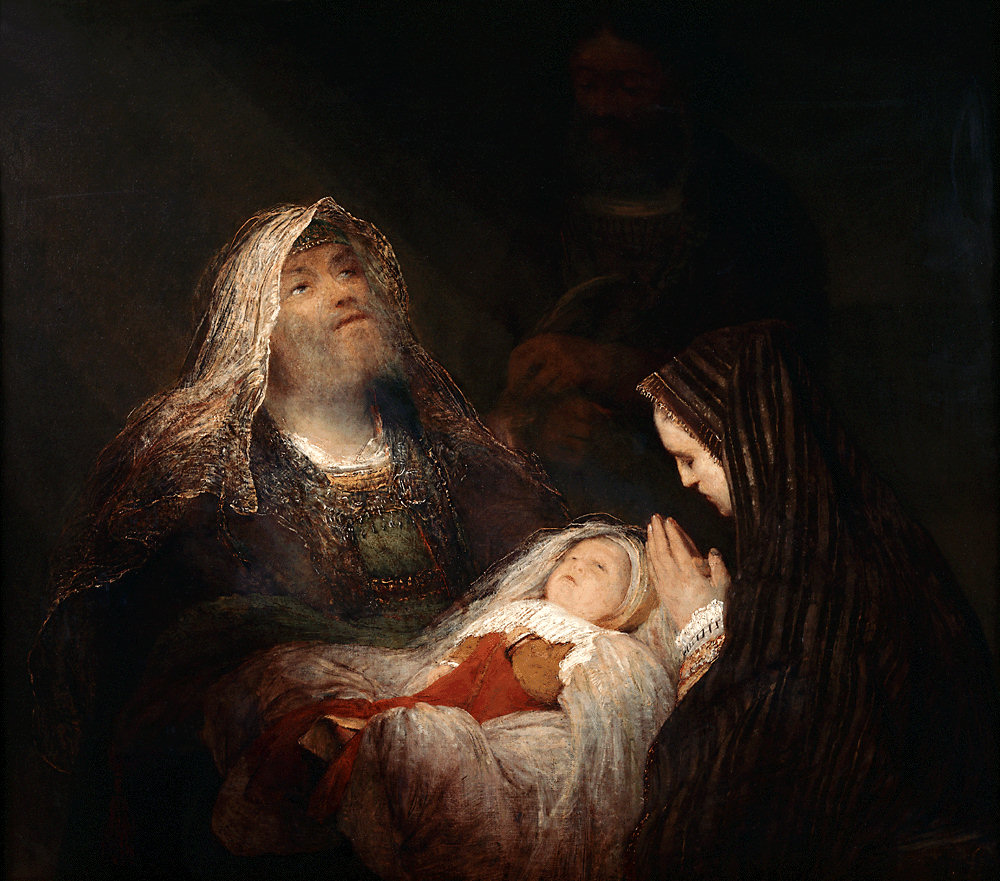
- Simeon, painted by Aert de Gelder, c. 1700
- English: I have enough
- Native name: Ich habe genung
- Occasion: Purification of Mary
- Performed: 2 February 1727: Leipzig
- Movements: 5
- Vocal: Solo bass (82a: soprano)
- Instrumental: Oboe (82a: flute); 2 violins; viola; continuo

Ich habe genug (original: Ich habe genung, English: "I have enough" or "I am content"), BWV 82, (Note: "BWV" is Bach-Werke-Verzeichnis, a thematic catalogue of Bach's works.) is a church cantata by Johann Sebastian Bach. He composed the solo cantata for bass in Leipzig in 1727 for the Feast Mariae Reinigung (Purification of Mary) and first performed it on 2 February 1727. In a version for soprano, BWV 82a, possibly first performed in 1731, the part of the obbligato oboe is replaced by a flute. Part of the music appears in the Notebook for Anna Magdalena Bach. The cantata is one of the most recorded and performed of Bach's sacred cantatas. The opening aria and so-called "slumber aria" are regarded as some of the most inspired creations of Bach.

== History and words ==
Bach composed the cantata in his fourth year in Leipzig for the feast Purification of Mary. The prescribed readings for the feast day were taken from the book of Malachi, "the Lord will come to his temple" (Malachi 3:1–4), and from the Gospel of Luke, the purification of Mary and the presentation of Jesus at the Temple, including Simeon's canticle Nunc dimittis (Luke 2:22–32), on which the libretto is based. In previous years Bach had composed two cantatas concentrating on Simeon's canticle, Erfreute Zeit im neuen Bunde, BWV 83, in 1724 and the chorale cantata on Martin Luther's paraphrase of the canticle, Mit Fried und Freud ich fahr dahin, BWV 125, in 1725. More than in these earlier works, the text of Ich habe genug stresses the desire to escape earthly misery and be united with Jesus. Until recently the poet's identity was not known, but recent research suggests that he was Christoph Birkmann, a student at the University of Leipzig in the 1720s.

Bach first performed the cantata on 2 February 1727. The extant autograph score and the parts show that he performed it at least three more times, in a version for soprano, BWV 82a, the first possibly in 1731 or even as early as 1730, another version for soprano in 1735; and again for bass, with minor changes to the original version, after 1745. Bach obviously had a high regard for this work. The first recitative and most of the aria "Schlummert ein" were copied to the Notebook for Anna Magdalena Bach in a version with continuo accompaniment, presumably entered by Anna Magdalena Bach for her own use. Other cantatas that Bach performed for the same occasion are, according to Alfred Dürr, Komm, du süße Todesstunde, BWV 161, Ich lasse dich nicht, du segnest mich denn, BWV 157, and Der Friede sei mit dir, BWV 158, with similar topics.

In the first version of the cantata, the choice of the bass voice probably illustrates the old man Simeon. The soprano voice shows more clearly that the situation applies to that of any believer.

=== Structure and scoring ===
The cantata is structured in five movements, with alternating arias and recitatives. In the first version it was scored for a bass soloist and a Baroque instrumental ensemble of oboes (Ob), two violins (Vl), viola (Va), and basso continuo. It takes about 23 minutes to perform. Another version exists for soprano, transposed from C minor to E minor with the oboe part replaced by flute and slightly altered. In the 1740s version for bass, an oboe da caccia is the obbligato instrument.

In the following table, the scoring follows the Neue Bach-Ausgabe (New Bach Edition), for the version for bass in C minor. The keys and time signatures are from Alfred Dürr, and use the symbol for common time. The continuo, played throughout, is not shown.

Movements of Ich habe genug, BWV 82
No.	Title	Text	Type	Vocal	Winds	Strings	Key	Time
1	Ich habe genug	Birkmann	Aria	Bass	Ob	2Vl Va	C minor	3/8
2	Ich habe genug	Birkmann	Recitative	Bass				common time
3	Schlummert ein, ihr matten Augen	Birkmann	Aria	Bass	Ob (ad lib)	2Vl Va	E-flat major	common time
4	Mein Gott! wenn kömmt das schöne: Nun!	Birkmann	Recitative	Bass				common time
5	Ich freue mich auf meinen Tod	Birkmann	aria	Bass	Ob	2Vl Va	C minor	3/8

== Music ==
"Ich habe genug"
Hans Hotter, Sidney Sutcliffe (oboe), Philharmonia Orchestra, Anthony Bernard (cond.), 1950

The first movement, an aria, begins with an expressive melody of the obbligato oboe which is picked up by the voice on the words "Ich habe genug" (I have enough). The beginning upward leap of a minor sixth is reminiscent of the aria "Erbarme dich" (Have mercy) in Bach's St Matthew Passion and the aria "Wenn kömmst du, mein Heil?" (When will you come, my salvation?) from Wachet auf, ruft uns die Stimme, BWV 140. The first motif is changed to a phrase that appears at the end of three vocal sections. A similar motif begins the middle section on the words "Ich hab ihn erblickt" (I have seen him), turning upwards in the end. Klaus Hofmann notes a "feeling of serene contentedness with life" in "elegiac tones" as the aria's expression. Musicologist Julian Mincham notes "that instant when body and soul come to rest and are resigned and in complete harmony. Bach encapsulates this experience of peace and acquiescent submission beyond anything that mere words can convey." He sees the "flowing oboe arabesques", which the singer imitates twice on the word "Freude" (joy) as a "clear indication that their expressive function is to proclaim the Christian's personal bliss, an inextricable element of this important experience of life".

The following recitative begins with the same words as the aria, "Ich habe genug", on a new melody. The middle section stresses the words "Laßt uns mit diesem Manne ziehn!" (Let us go with this man!), speaking of following Jesus, by an arioso in which the continuo follows the singer.

"Schlummert ein, ihr matten Augen"
Hotter and others, 1950

The central aria, beginning "Schlummert ein, ihr matten Augen" (Fall asleep, you weary eyes), is a Schlummer-Arie (slumber aria). In a complex structure, it is not only a da capo aria of three sections framed by a ritornello of the strings, but repeats the first section in the center of the middle section. Frequent use of pedal point suggests rest, fermatas stop the forward motion, as described by Mincham who writes, "The frequent pauses, where everything temporarily comes to a standstill, are suggestive of that peaceful closing of life where there is no activity and disorder is a thing of the past".

A short secco recitative, beginning "Mein Gott! wenn kömmt das schöne: Nun!" (My God! When will the lovely 'now!' come), ends with a downward continuo line, suggesting both "taking one's leave and being lowered into the welcoming grave".

The concluding aria is a joyful dance, anticipating death as the fulfillment of desire, "Ich freue mich auf meinen Tod" (I am looking forward to my death). The "joyful longing for the hereafter" is expressed by "agile coloraturas that characterize the entire movement". Mincham notes that the final aria corresponds to the first in similarity of the scoring with the obbligato instrument, key, and triple time. The final aria is faster, marked "vivace". The text first treats the "joy of anticipation of death and the desire for it to happen imminently", then, treated in the middle section, the "conviction that death will release us from the misery of the world to which we have been chained".

== Recordings ==
As one of the best known of Bach's church cantatas, set for both a male and a female soloist, it is "the most frequently recorded of all the Bach cantatas over a period of more than sixty years", with 101 complete recordings listed, and several more of individual movements, especially the version from Anna Magdalena Bach's notebook. Dietrich Fischer-Dieskau recorded the cantata three times, in 1951 with Karl Ristenpart, in July 1968 with Karl Richter, in 1983 with Helmuth Rilling. In 1966, Janet Baker was the soloist in a recording conducted by Yehudi Menuhin.

- J. S. Bach: Cantata No. 82 – Ich habe genug, Walter Susskind, Philharmonia Orchestra, Hans Hotter, Columbia (unissued) 1948
- Bach: Kantaten BWV 56 & 82, Karl Ristenpart, Kammerorchester Karl Ristenpart, Dietrich Fischer-Dieskau, Archiv Produktion 1951
- Bach Cantatas No. 56 & 82, Geraint Jones, The Geraint Jones Orchestra, Gérard Souzay, His Master's Voice 1959
- Les Grandes Cantates de J.S. Bach Vol. 18, Fritz Werner, Pforzheim Chamber Orchestra, Barry McDaniel, Erato 1964
- J. S. Bach: Cantatas Nos. 56 & 82, John Shirley-Quirk, Academy of St Martin in the Fields, Neville Marriner, Decca 1965
- Bach: Two Solo Cantatas: Cantata BWV 169, Gott soll allein mein Herze haben; Cantata BWV 82a, Ich habe genug, Yehudi Menuhin, Bath Festival Orchestra, Janet Baker, EMI 1966
- J. S. Bach: Kantaten BWV 56 & 82 Karl Richter, Münchener Bach-Orchester, Dietrich Fischer-Dieskau 1969
- Bach: Cantatas (BWV 56, 4, 82) Frans Brüggen, Max van Egmond, Sony 1977
- Die Bach Kantate Vol. 4, Helmuth Rilling, Bach-Collegium Stuttgart, Dietrich Fischer-Dieskau, Hänssler 1983
- J. S. Bach: Solokantaten, Hans Stadlmair, Münchener Kammerorchester, Josef Loibl, Schwann Musica Sacre 1984
- J. S. Bach: Cantatas BWV 202 · 82a · 199, Dominique Debart, L'Ensemble de Basse-Normandie, Teresa Żylis-Gara, Rudolphe 1986
- J. S. Bach: Kantaten BWV 56, 82, 158, Olaf Bär, Scottish Chamber Orchestra, Peter Schreier (dir.), EMI 1991.
- J. S. Bach: Cantates pour basse, Philippe Herreweghe, La Chapelle Royale, Peter Kooy, Harmonia Mundi, 1991.
- J. S. Bach: Cantatas BWV 82 · 49 · 58, Sigiswald Kuijken, La Petite Bande, Klaus Mertens, Accent 1993
- J. S. Bach: Wedding Cantatas BWV 82, 202, 210, Emma Kirkby, Christopher Hogwood, Academy of Ancient Music, Decca, 1996.
- J. S. Bach: Cantatas for the Feast of Purification of Mary, John Eliot Gardiner, English Baroque Soloists, Peter Harvey, Soli Deo Gloria 2000
- J. S. Bach: Complete Cantatas Vol. 16, Ton Koopman, Klaus Mertens, Amsterdam Baroque Orchestra, Antoine Marchand 2001
- Bach Cantatas BWV 82 and 199, Craig Smith, Emmanuel Music, Lorraine Hunt Lieberson, Nonesuch, 2002
- Bach Cantatas, Rainer Kussmaul, Berliner Barock Solisten, Thomas Quasthoff, Deutsche Grammophon, 2004
- Bach: Kantaten · Cantatas BWV 82, BWV 158, BWV 56, Michael Schneider, La Stagione, Gotthold Schwarz, Capriccio 2006
- J. S. Bach: Cantatas Vol. 38 (Solo Cantatas) – BWV 52, 55, 82, 58, Masaaki Suzuki, Bach Collegium Japan, Peter Kooy, BIS 2006
- German Baroque Cantatas, Stephan MacLeod (singer and conductor), Gli Angeli Genève, Sony Classical 2007
- Bach Cantatas for Bass BWV 82/158/56/203 Ryo Terakado, il Gardellino, Dominik Wörner. Passacaille 2013
- J. S. Bach: Cantata BWV 82, Lars Ulrik Mortensen, Thomas E. Bauer, Netherlands Bach Society, All of Bach 2014
- J. S. Bach: Cantatas BWV 54, 82 & 170, Iestyn Davies (countertenor), Jonathan Cohen, Arcangelo, Hyperion 2017
