= Am Abend aber desselbigen Sabbats, BWV 42 =

Church cantata by Johann Sebastian Bach for the First Sunday after Easter

Am Abend aber desselbigen Sabbats
- BWV 42
- Church cantata by J. S. Bach
- The Incredulity of Saint Thomas by Caravaggio, 1601–02
- Occasion: Sunday after Easter
- Bible text: John 20:19–31
- Chorale: by Jakob Fabricius; by Martin Luther
- Performed: 8 April 1725: Leipzig
- Movements: 7
- Vocal: SATB solo and choir
- Instrumental: 2 oboes; bassoon; 2 violins; viola; continuo

Am Abend aber desselbigen Sabbats (On the evening, however, of the same Sabbath), BWV 42, is a church cantata by Johann Sebastian Bach. He composed it in Leipzig for the first Sunday after Easter and first performed it on 8 April 1725. The cantata is part of Bach's second cantata cycle during his tenure as Thomaskantor that began in 1723. It is the only cantata of that cycle to begin with a sinfonia.

An unknown librettist began the text with a verse from the Gospel reading, from the Resurrection appearances of Jesus in Jerusalem, and included three hymn stanzas: one from "Verzage nicht, o Häuflein klein" by Jakob Fabricius and two from Luther's "Erhalt uns, Herr, bei deinem Wort". Bach structured the cantata in seven movements and scored it for four vocal soloists, a four-part choir only in the closing chorale, and a Baroque instrumental ensemble of two oboes, bassoon, strings and basso continuo.

== History ==
=== Background ===
Bach was appointed Thomaskantor (director of church music) in Leipzig in 1723, responsible for the music at four churches of the city, and for the training and education of the boys singing in the Thomanerchor boys' choir. He took office on 30 May 1723. In the new position, Bach decided to compose church cantatas for almost all liturgical events for the first twelve months; they became his first cantata cycle. The following year, Bach went on to write a second cantata cycle, now basing each on a Lutheran hymn. He kept the format until Palm Sunday 1725, when he performed Wie schön leuchtet der Morgenstern, BWV 1. He then returned to the former style of church cantatas for Easter and the following occasions, possibly because he lost his librettist.

=== Readings and text ===
Bach composed Am Abend aber desselbigen Sabbats in Leipzig for the First Sunday after Easter, called Quasimodogeniti.

The prescribed readings for the Sunday were from the First Epistle of John, "our faith is the victory" (1 John 5:4–10), and from the Gospel of John, the appearance of Jesus to the Disciples in Jerusalem, first without Thomas, and later with him (John 20:19–31). The unknown librettist included for the beginning of the cantata verse 19 from the Gospel and used three stanzas from two chorales. The text of the fourth movement is a stanza from "Verzage nicht, o Häuflein klein", published in 1632 by Jakob Fabricius, which had also been attributed to Johann Michael Altenburg. The cantata is closed by two stanzas which had appeared added to Luther's "Erhalt uns, Herr, bei deinem Wort": "Verleih uns Frieden gnädiglich", Luther's German version of Da pacem Domine (Give peace, Lord, 1531), and "Gib unsern Fürsten und all'r Obrigkeit" (Give our rulers and all lawgivers), a stanza by Johann Walter paraphrasing 1 Timothy 2:2 (1566), which is concluded with a final amen. Werner Neumann suggested that Bach himself may have been the anonymous poet, while Charles Sanford Terry proposed Christian Weiss, a pastor in Leipzig. Bach scholar Alfred Dürr supposed that it was the same author who wrote Bleib bei uns, denn es will Abend werden, BWV 6, first performed six days earlier on Easter Monday of 1725.

After the quote from the Gospel of John, the poet paraphrased, in movement 3, words of Jesus from the Gospel of Matthew, Matthew 18:20: "Wo zwei oder drei versammelt sind in meinem Namen, da bin ich mitten unter ihnen" (For where two or three are gathered together in my name, there am I in the midst of them).

=== Performances ===
Bach led the Thomanerchor in the first performance of the cantata on 8 April 1725. He performed it again at least twice, on 1 April 1731, as a printed textbook shows, and c. 1742, per watermarks in an instrumental part.

== Music ==
=== Structure and scoring ===
Bach structured the cantata in seven movements, beginning with a Sinfonia. He may have intended to ease work for the choir after the busy holiday week. He scored the work for four vocal soloists (soprano (S), alto (A), tenor (T) and bass (B)), a four-part choir only in the closing chorale, and a Baroque instrumental ensemble of two oboes (Ob), bassoon (Fg), two violins (Vl), viola (Va), cello (Vc) and basso continuo (Bc). The duration of the cantata is given as 33 minutes.

In the following table of the movements, the scoring, keys and time signatures are taken from Dürr's standard work Die Kantaten von Johann Sebastian Bach. The continuo, which plays throughout, is not shown.

Movements of Am Abend aber desselbigen Sabbats
No.	Title	Type	Vocal	Winds	Strings	Key	Time
1		Sinfonia		2Ob, Fg	2Vl, Va	D major	common time
2	Am Abend aber desselbigen Sabbats	Recitative	T	Fg	Bc		common time
3	Wo zwei und drei versammlet sind	Aria	A	2Ob, Fg	2Vl, Va	G major	common time
4	Verzage nicht, o Häuflein klein	Duet	S T	Fg	Vc	B minor	3/4
5	Man kann hiervon ein schön Exempel sehen	Recitative	B	Fg			common time
6	Jesus ist ein Schild der Seinen	Aria	B		2Vl Bc	A major	cut time
7	Verleih uns Frieden gnädiglich	Chorale	SATB	2Ob Fg	2Vl Va	F♯ minor	cut time

=== Movements ===
==== 1 ====
Bach possibly took the opening sinfonia from earlier music. According to John Eliot Gardiner, this movement and the first aria are both taken from Bach's lost congratulatory cantata Der Himmel dacht auf Anhalts Ruhm und Glück, BWV 66a, celebrating the 24th birthday of Leopold, Prince of Anhalt-Köthen, on 10 December 1718. Dürr believed that it is a movement from a concerto. It does not highlight a particular solo instrument, although Julian Mincham saw a close resemblance to concerti which do, such as the opening movements of the Violin Concerto in E major, BWV 1042, and the Harpsichord Concerto, BWV 1053. Rather, it is a type of concerto grosso (or "concerto a due cori", concerto for two choirs), the strings interacting with a concertino of the woodwinds, oboes and bassoon. The two groups first introduce their own lively themes, which are distinct but related to each other. They then exchange their themes and play together. The middle section begins with a surprising new motif for oboe and bassoon, which Bach marked cantabile. Am Abend aber desselbigen Sabbats is the only cantata in the second cycle to begin with a sinfonia.

==== 2 ====
The Bible quote "Am Abend aber desselbigen Sabbats, da die Jünger versammlet" (On the evening, however, of the same Sabbath, when the disciples had gathered) is sung in recitative by the tenor as the Evangelist, accompanied by the continuo in repeated fast notes, possibly illustrating the anxious heart beat of the disciples when Jesus appears: "On the evening, however, of the same Sabbath, when the disciples had gathered and the door was locked out of fear of the Jews, Jesus came and walked among them".

==== 3 ====
In the third movement, "Wo zwei und drei versammlet sind in Jesu teurem Namen" (Where two or three are gathered together in Jesus's dear name), an aria marked adagio, the repetition is kept in the bassoon, but the strings hold long chords and the oboes play extended melodic lines. According to Dürr, it may have been another movement from the same concerto on which the first movement relies.

==== 4 ====
Bach composed the chorale text of the fourth movement, "Verzage nicht, o Häuflein klein" (Do not despair, o little flock), as a duet, accompanied only by the continuo, including bassoon. Fragments of the usual chorale theme, "Kommt her zu mir, spricht Gottes Sohn", can be detected occasionally. Terry interprets that the bassoon obbligato was intended to accompany a chorale melody which "never actually sounded", conveying the "hiddenness" of the church in the world.

==== 5 ====
The bass sings a recitative, "Man kann hiervon ein schön Exempel sehen an dem, was zu Jerusalem geschehen" (One can find a perfect message in what happened in Jerusalem). It ends in an arioso, to prepare for the last aria.

==== 6 ====
In "Jesus ist ein Schild der Seinen, wenn sie die Verfolgung trifft" (Jesus is the shield of his own, when persecution follows them), the bass is accompanied by the divided violins and the continuo. Felix Loy, the editor of a critical edition of the cantata for Carus, noted that the theme illustrates again a contrast, between the "restlessness of the world" and the "peace of those who believe in Jesus". While the instruments play in wild motion, the bass sings a calm expressive melody, only accenting the word "Verfolgung" (persecution) by faster motion in long melismas.

==== 7 ====
The chorale theme of Luther's chorale, "Verleih uns Frieden gnädiglich, Herr Gott, zu unsern Zeiten" (Grant us peace graciously), was published by Martin Luther in the Kirchē gesenge, mit vil schönen Psalmen unnd Melodey (edited by Johann Walter, published in Nürnberg in 1531), and then in the Geistliche Lieder by Joseph Klug (Wittenberg, 1535). The melody of the additional stanza, "Gib unsern Fürsten und all'r Obrigkeit Fried und gut Regiment" (Give our rulers and all lawgivers peace and good government), was first published in Das christlich Kinderlied D. Martini Lutheri in Wittenberg, 1566. Bach set it for four parts.

== Manuscripts and publication ==
Bach's autograph score of the cantata and a set of parts that Bach had revised are extant. The cantata was first published in 1860 in the first complete edition of Bach's work, the Bach-Gesellschaft Ausgabe. The volume in question was edited by Wilhelm Rust. In the Neue Bach-Ausgabe, it was published in 1988, edited by Reinmar Emans, with a critical report the following year.

== Recordings ==
A list of recordings is provided on the Bach Cantatas Website. Ensembles playing period instruments in historically informed performances are shown with a green background.

Recordings of Am Abend aber desselbigen Sabbats
Title	Conductor / Choir / Orchestra	Soloists	Label	Year	Orch. type
Bach Made in Germany Vol. 1 – Cantatas IV	Günther Ramin Thomanerchor Gewandhausorchester	Marianne Basner; Gerda Schriever; Gert Lutze; Otto Siegl	Berlin Classics	1953	
Bach Aria Group – Cantatas & Cantata Movements	Robert Shaw Robert Shaw Chorale & Orchestra Bach Aria Group Orchestra	Eileen Farrell; Carol Smith; Jan Peerce; Norman Farrow	RCA Victor	1954	
J. S. Bach: Cantatas No. 42, No. 35	Hermann Scherchen Wiener Akademie-Kammerchor Vienna Radio Orchestra	Teresa Stich-Randall; Maureen Forrester; Alexander Young; John Boyden	Westminster/Baroque Music Club	1964	
J. S. Bach: Das Kantatenwerk – Sacred Cantatas Vol. 3	Nikolaus Harnoncourt: Wiener Sängerknaben; Chorus Viennensis; Concentus Musicus Wien	soloist of the Wiener Sängerknaben; Paul Esswood; Kurt Equiluz; Ruud van der Meer	Teldec	1974	Period
Die Bach Kantate Vol. 31	Helmuth Rilling Gächinger Kantorei Bach-Collegium Stuttgart	Arleen Augér; Peter Schreier; Adalbert Kraus; Philippe Huttenlocher	Hänssler	1981	
J. S. Bach: Ich hatte viel Bekümmernis	Philippe Herreweghe Collegium Vocale Gent La Chapelle Royale	Barbara Schlick; Gérard Lesne; Howard Crook; Peter Kooy	Harmonia Mundi France	1990	Period
Bach Edition Vol. 4 – Cantatas Vol. 1	Pieter Jan Leusink Holland Boys Choir Netherlands Bach Collegium	Ruth Holton; Sytse Buwalda; Knut Schoch; Bas Ramselaar	Brilliant Classics	1999	Period
Bach Cantatas Vol. 23: Arnstadt/Echternach	John Eliot Gardiner Monteverdi Choir English Baroque Soloists	Gillian Keith; Daniel Taylor; Charles Daniels; Stephen Varcoe	Soli Deo Gloria	2000	Period
J. S. Bach: Complete Cantatas Vol. 14	Ton Koopman Amsterdam Baroque Orchestra & Choir	Deborah York; Bogna Bartosz; Jörg Dürmüller; Klaus Mertens	Antoine Marchand	2001	Period
J. S. Bach: Cantatas Vol. 36 (Cantatas from Leipzig 1725)	Masaaki Suzuki Bach Collegium Japan	Yukari Nonoshita; Robin Blaze; James Gilchrist; Dominik Wörner	BIS	2006	Period
