= Der Friede sei mit dir, BWV 158 =

Cantata by Johann Sebastian Bach

Der Friede sei mit dir (Peace be with you), BWV 158, is one of the shortest of the cantatas by Johann Sebastian Bach and features a bass soloist. It survives as a cantata for the third day of Easter but might be a fragment of a work originally written for Purification. Given this background, and the fact that it was copied by Christian Friedrich Penzel, one of Bach's last students, there is a confusing variety of proposed composition dates. It may date back to Bach's Weimar period, although a date as late as 1735 has been suggested.

== History and text ==
The surviving source is a copy by Penzel, identified on the title page as being for the Purification (the Lutheran feast Mariae Reinigung), which was celebrated on 2 February, but with an alternate designation for Easter Tuesday in the parts.

Bach composed several cantatas for the Purification and the texts are related to Simeon's canticle Nunc dimittis, part of the prescribed readings. Because of the references to the "Nunc dimittis" in Der Friede sei mit dir and because of the alternate title page designation, it is widely assumed that at least the two central movements were originally part of a longer cantata for the Purification, with a different introductory recitative not evoking Christ's Easter reappearance to the disciples. The obbligato writing in the aria, which appears better suited to flute than the "violino" specified in Penzel's copy, is cited in support of the hypothesis that it was originally written for a different occasion.

Joshua Rifkin has proposed the dates 15 April 1727 or 30 March 1728 for the premiere of the surviving Easter version. The prescribed readings for this day were from the Acts of the Apostles, the sermon of Paul in Antiochia (Acts 13:26–33), and from the Gospel of Luke, the appearance of Jesus to the Apostles in Jerusalem (Luke 24:36–47). The librettist is unknown but may have been Salomon Franck, quoting hymn stanzas by Johann Georg Albinus and Martin Luther.

== Scoring and structure ==
The cantata is scored for soprano and bass vocal soloists, four-part choir, oboe, violin, and basso continuo.

Because no complete copy of the work survives, it is possible that there were originally more than the four movements now known. In particular, another aria is thought to have preceded the final movement.

1. Recitative (bass): Der Friede sei mit dir (21 measures)
2. Aria (bass) and chorale (soprano): Welt, ade, ich bin dein müde (94 measures with chorale tune by Johann Rosenmüller)
3. Recitative and arioso (bass): Nun, Herr, regiere meinen Sinn (18 measures)
4. Chorale: Hier ist das rechte Osterlamm (16 measures)

== Music ==
Both recitatives are "supple" and secco. The second movement is "a fusion of a dulcet aria in the form of a trio sonata" for bass, violin, and continuo, with interspersed lines from the chorale performed by soprano and oboe. It is formally a da capo aria introduced by an eighteen-measure ritornello. The work ends with a four-part harmonization of the chorale.

== Recordings ==
- Chor der St. Hedwigs-Kathedrale Berlin / Berliner Philharmoniker, Karl Forster. Bach: Cantatas, Arias & Chorales. EMI Classics, 1958.
- Monteverdi-Chor, Leonhardt-Consort, Jürgen Jürgens. J.S. Bach: Kantaten · Cantatas Nr. 27, Nr. 118, Nr. 158, Nr. 59. Telefunken, 1966.
- Gächinger Kantorei Stuttgart / Bach-Collegium Stuttgart, Helmuth Rilling. J.S. Bach: Solokantaten. Cantate, 1969.
- Amsterdam Baroque Orchestra & Choir, Ton Koopman. J.S. Bach: Complete Cantatas Vol. 21. Josef Loibl, 1984.
- Thomanerchor / La Stagione, Michael Schneider. Bach: Kantaten · Cantatas BWV 82, BWV 158, BWV 56. Capriccio, 2006.
- Bach Cantatas for Bass BWV 82/158/56/203 Ryo Terakado, il Gardellino, Dominik Wörner. Passacaille 2013.
