= Hidemi Suzuki =

Japanese musician

Hidemi Suzuki (鈴木 秀美, Suzuki Hidemi, born 1957 in Kobe) is a Japanese cellist and conductor.

== Career ==
Suzuki took his music degrees at the Toho Gakuen School of Music in Tokyo, with a focus on cello and conducting. After a successful career as a modern cellist, he went to the Netherlands in 1984 to study Baroque cello with the Dutch period-instrument pioneer Anner Bylsma. Suzuki won first prize at the First International Baroque Cello Competition in Paris in 1986. He was a member of the Orchestra of the Eighteenth Century under Frans Brüggen from 1985 to 1993, then principal cellist of La Petite Bande with Sigiswald Kuijken between 1992 and 2001. He was professor of Baroque Cello at the Royal Conservatory of Brussels from 1994 to 2000. His students have included Antje Geusen, Christoph Theinert Tormod Dalen, and Mime Yamahiro.

In 2001, Suzuki returned to Japan, where he serves on the faculty of Tokyo National University of Fine Arts and Music. In 2001, he founded and became conductor of Orchestra Libera Classica, a period-instrument group focused on Haydn, and the classical era and has released live recordings from the "Arte dell'arco" label. He was a member of the Bach Collegium Japan, the Boccherini Quartet, Tokyo Bach Mozart Orchestra, Classical Players Tokyo (CPT), and the quartet, Mito dell'Arco He worked with the Mexican bowmaker Luis Emilio Rodriguez on the reconstruction of historically accurate bow construction methods.

Suzuki was the first Japanese cellist to record the six Cello Suites of Johann Sebastian Bach on a period instrument, in 1995; it was awarded an Artistic Creation Prize by Japan's Agency for Cultural Affairs that year. He won a Diapason d'Or in France for his recording of early works of Ludwig van Beethoven; his recording of the cello concertos of Haydn's concerti with La Petite Bande won the Record Academy award in Japan. He has also recorded the cello sonatas by Francesco Geminiani, the cello concertos of Carl Philipp Emanuel Bach with the Bach Collegium Japan, and chamber music of George Frideric Handel.

== Personal life ==
Hidemi Suzuki is the brother of the harpsichordist, organist, and conductor Masaaki Suzuki.
