= Yukari Nonoshita =

Japanese soprano singer

- Born: Japan
- Other name: 野々下由香里
- Occupation: Classical music singer (soprano)
- Organizations: Bach Collegium Japan

Yukari Nonoshita (jp:野々下 由香里, Nonoshita Yukari) is a Japanese soprano. She studied at the Tokyo National University of Fine Arts and Music. She continued her studies in France at the Conservatoire National de Saint-Maur and the École Normale de Musique de Paris, with Camille Maurane, Hiroko Nakamura and Gérard Souzay.

On the opera stage, she first appeared in Rennes as Cherubino in Mozart's Le Nozze di Figaro, then in parts such as Rosina in Rossini's Il Barbiere di Siviglia and Siébel in Gounod's Faust at Rennes and Angers. She then returned to Japan, where she has focused on French, Spanish, and Japanese songs of all periods. She took part in Historically informed performances, such as Maasaki Suzuki's project to record all cantatas by Bach, and the Baroque Opera Project of Ryo Terakado. A reviewer of volume 26 of Suzuki's project, which includes Schmücke dich, o liebe Seele, BWV 180, praised her for "her clear upper range and refinement of detail in remarkably well-focused singing".
