= Accent Records =

Belgian record label

Accent Records is a Belgian record label started in 1978 by Adelheid and Andreas Glatt, releasing classical music from between 1500 AD and the 20th century, but primarily from the 17th and 18th centuries.

== Artists having recorded for Accent Records include ==
- Luc Devos (fortepiano)
- Paul Dombrecht (oboe, leader)
- Roel Dieltiens (violoncello)
- René Jacobs (countertenor)
- Konrad Junghänel (lute)
- Robert Kohnen (harpsichord)
- Sigiswald Kuijken (violin, viola da gamba, leader)
- Barthold Kuijken (flute)
- Wieland Kuijken (violoncello, viola da gamba)
- Marcel Ponseele (oboe)
- Raphaella Smits (guitar)
- Liuwe Tamminga (organ)
- Jos van Immerseel (fortepiano)
- Erik Van Nevel with Currende (vocal and instrumental ensemble)
- La Petite Bande (ensemble)
- La Colombina (ensemble)
- Concerto Palatino (ensemble)
- William Dongois & Le Concert Brisé (chamber ensemble featuring cornett

== See also ==
- List of record labels
