= Bach Medal =

German music award

- Awarded for: "efforts to promote the work of Johann Sebastian Bach"
- Location: Leipzig
- Country: Germany
- Presented by: Lord Mayor Leipzig, Bachfest Leipzig
- Reward: Medal (Meissen porcelain)
- First award: 2003
- Website: www.bachfestleipzig.de/en/bachfest/bach-medal

The Bach Medal (German: Bach-Medaille) is awarded by the Lord Mayor of Leipzig during the Bachfest Leipzig in recognition of efforts to promote the work of Johann Sebastian Bach. The Bach Medal of the City of Leipzig is an annual award.

== Jury ==
- Members of the artistic directorate of Bachfest
- Thomaskantor
- Rector of the University of Music and Theatre Leipzig
- Gewandhauskapellmeister
- Intendant of Leipzig Opera

== Recipients ==
- 2003 Gustav Leonhardt
- 2004 Helmuth Rilling
- 2005 Sir John Eliot Gardiner
- 2006 Ton Koopman
- 2007 Nikolaus Harnoncourt
- 2008 Hermann Max
- 2009 Frieder Bernius
- 2010 Philippe Herreweghe
- 2011 Herbert Blomstedt
- 2012 Masaaki Suzuki
- 2013 Peter Schreier
- 2014 Akademie für Alte Musik Berlin
- 2015 Peter Neumann
- 2016 Peter Kooij
- 2017 Reinhard Goebel
- 2018 Robert D. Levin
- 2019 Klaus Mertens
- 2020 Angela Hewitt
- 2021 Christoph Wolff and Hans-Joachim Schulze
- 2022 András Schiff
- 2023 Thomanerchor
- 2024 Andreas Staier
- 2025 Marcel Ponseele
- 2026 J. S. Bach-Stiftung St. Gallen
