= Cello da spalla =

Small cello played against the shoulder

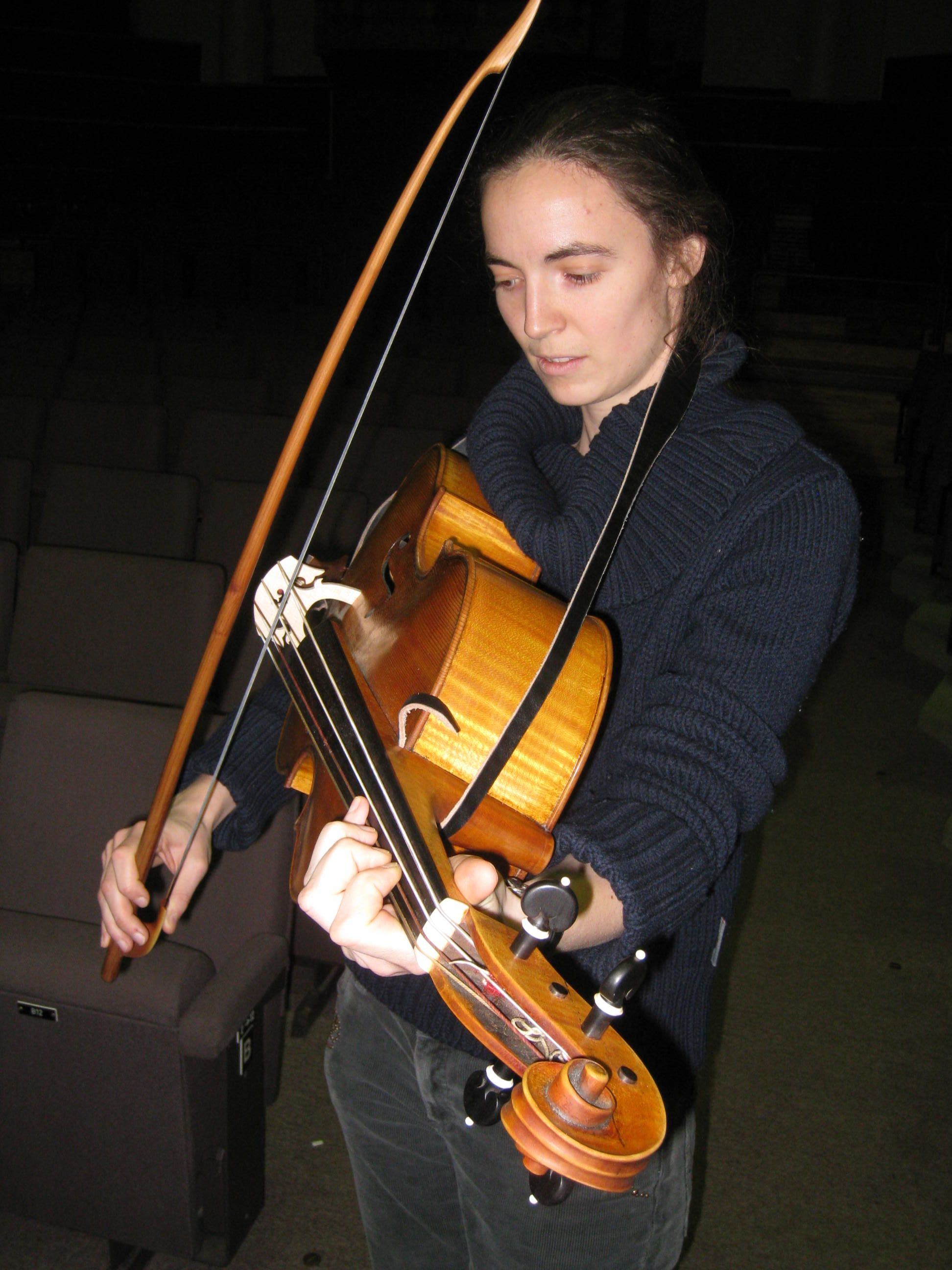
Violoncello da spalla

The violoncello da spalla, known informally as the cello da spalla, is a small 4 or 5-string cello played braced against the shoulder. Its tuning is the same as the violoncello, with a fifth string added to the upper register, making the open string tuning from lowest to highest: C2, G2, D3, A3, E4 in scientific pitch notation.

The violoncello da spalla was designed to be played by violinists, who have limited experience playing instruments such as the viola da gamba or cello, which are held in a vertical position fixed between legs. The violoncello da spalla is held on the shoulder and chest, and is larger than the viola.

There are also numerous instances of suites, serenades, divertimenti, and cassations that begin and/or end with marches. If these marches were to get the players in or out, the bass lines could have been played on these instruments, as well as on procession cellos which are regular cellos with a tiny hole under the neck where the player can attach a hook and a strap.

== Possible use by Bach ==
Because of the variety in terminology used in the eighteenth century, it can be difficult now to determine exactly what instrument was intended in specific instances. The terms "violoncello da spalla" and "viola da spalla" tend to appear in theoretical works rather than as instrument designations from composers. However, it is possible that J. S. Bach, and perhaps other composers, might have intended the violoncello da spalla in cases where the "violoncello piccolo" is specified. This term, "violoncello piccolo", features in many of the Bach cantatas, with the parts written in a variety of clefs (bass, tenor, alto and soprano). The variety of clefs has been taken as a representation of the instrument's relatively wide range. The five-string version of the instrument may have been what Bach had in mind for performing his Cello Suite No. 6 (which was intended for an instrument with the tuning CGdae'). The high E string on the violoncello da spalla also allows for the possibility of playing violin music an octave lower than written (e.g. the Bach violin sonatas and partitas, Mozart Violin Sonatas and Concertos, etc.) without the need of a special arrangement.

== Musicians ==
- François Fernandez
- Sigiswald Kuijken
- Sergey Malov
- Ryo Terakado
- Dmitry Badiarov
- Stephen Collins
- Samuel Hengebaert
- Olav Johansson
- Mikael Marin
- Andrew Gonzalez
- Makoto Akatsu
- Gregorio Ibáñez Gómez

== See also ==
- Chest of viols
- Division viol
- Lyra viol
- Viola bastarda
- Pardessus de viole
- Viol
- Violone
