= Mihoko Fujimura =

Japanese operatic mezzo-soprano (born 1966)

- Born: 1966 (age 58–59); Gifu Prefecture, Japan
- Education: Tokyo University of the Arts; Hochschule für Musik und Theater München
- Occupation: Operatic mezzo-soprano
- Organizations: Oper Graz; Bavarian State Opera
- Website: Official website

Mihoko Fujimura (Japanese: 藤村 実穂子, Hepburn: Fujimura Mihoko; born 1966) is a Japanese operatic mezzo-soprano who made an international career based in Europe. She was recognized internationally after her 2002 debut at the Bayreuth Festival as Fricka in Wagner's Ring cycle. In concert, she performed in Verdi's Requiem and Mahler's Resurrection Symphony. In 2020, she made her debut at the Metropolitan Opera.

== Life ==
Fujimura was born in the Gifu Prefecture and studied at the Tokyo University of the Arts with Hiroko Kimura, and at the Hochschule für Musik und Theater München with Josef Loibl from 1992 to 1995, graduating with a Masters of Music degree. She was a member of the Oper Graz from 1995 to 2000, appearing in roles such as Dorabella in Mozart's Così fan tutte, Azucena in Il trovatore, the title role of Bizet's Carmen, and Suzuki in Puccini's Madama Butterfly. From 1998, she worked also at the Bavarian State Opera. She sang as a guest at the Cologne Opera, Staatsoper Karlsruhe, Staatsoper Stuttgart from 2000, Oper Leipzig from 2001, and internationally at the New National Theatre Tokyo, the Maggio Musicale Fiorentino and the Aix-en-Provence Festival. In 2000, she first appeared at the Vienna State Opera, as Brangäne in Tristan und Isolde.

She made her debut at the Bayreuth Festival in 2002, as Fricka in Der Ring des Nibelungen. She added the roles of Waltraute and Erda in the Ring there, also Brangäne, and Kundry in Parsifal in 2008. Her role repertoire includes Idamante in Mozart's Idomeneo, Verdi roles Eboli in Don Carlos, Azucena in Il trovatore, and Amneris in Aida, and the title roles in Der Rosenkavalier by Richard Strauss and Mélisande in Debussy's Pelléas et Mélisande. She has been a regular guest at the Royal Opera House in London, La Scala in Milan, the Théâtre du Châtelet in Paris, Teatro Real in Madrid, and the Deutsche Oper Berlin. In 2020, she appeared at the Metropolitan Opera in New York City as Mary in Wagner's Der fliegende Holländer, conducted by Valery Gergiev.

She is active in concert, lied and oratorio, in a repertoire including Verdi's Requiem, Mahler's Das Lied von der Erde, Rückert-Lieder, and Des Knaben Wunderhorn, Wagner's Wesendonck Lieder, and Schönberg's Gurre-Lieder. She has worked with orchestras including the Münchner Philharmoniker, the Wiener Philharmoniker, the Symphonieorchester des Bayerischen Rundfunks, the London Symphony Orchestra, the London Philharmonic Orchestra, Orchestra of the Accademia di Santa Cecilia Rome, Orchestre de Paris, the Philadelphia Orchestra, National Symphony Orchestra Washington, the Montreal Symphony Orchestra and the Bamberger Symphoniker.

Fujimura has collaborated with conductors such as Claudio Abbado, Semyon Bychkov, Myung-whun Chung, Sir Colin Davis, Charles Dutoit, Christoph Eschenbach, Ádám Fischer, Daniele Gatti, Michael Gielen, Bernard Haitink, Daniel Harding, Mariss Jansons, Fabio Luisi, Kurt Masur, Kent Nagano, Jonathan Nott, Donald Runnicles, Peter Schneider, Christian Thielemann and Franz Welser-Möst.

She performed Fricka on a live recording of Die Walküre at the Bavarian State Opera in 2002, conducted by Zubin Mehta. A reviewer noted her attitude of firm authority, lush pastose mezzo timbre, and a vast volume ("ruhige, selbstbewusste Autorität und noch mehr durch sattes, pastoses Mezzotimbre und ein gewaltiges Stimmvolumen"). In 2012, she was the alto soloist in Mahler's Resurrection Symphony on a tour with the City of Birmingham Symphony Orchestra conducted by Andris Nelsons, alongside Lucy Crowe.

In 2024, she was designated a Person of Cultural Merit.
