= Dominik Wörner =

German opera singer

Dominik Wörner (born 1970) is a German classical bass singer in concert, Lied and opera. He is a specialist in Baroque music, especially works by Bach, but is open to music of other eras including contemporary music.

== Career ==
Born in Grünstadt, Wörner studied music at the State University of Music and Performing Arts Stuttgart, in Fribourg, Bern and Zürich. He studied church music, voice and musicology, voice with Jakob Stämpfli and Lied with Irwin Gage.

Wörner has performed with conductors such as Carl St.Clair, Christophe Coin, Thomas Hengelbrock, Philippe Herreweghe, Tõnu Kaljuste, Sigiswald Kuijken and Helmuth Rilling. He has recorded especially music by Johann Sebastian Bach, such as the vox Christi in his St John Passion and the Mass in B minor. He recorded several cantatas in the project conducted by Masaaki Suzuki with the Bach Collegium Japan to record all sacred Bach cantatas, including volume 33 in 2005 and volume 36 in 2006. He took part in Sigiswald Kuijken's project to record Cantatas through the Liturgical Year with the ensemble La Petite Bande on period instruments and one voice per part (OVPP). He recorded Bach's solo cantatas for bass such as Ich will den Kreuzstab gerne tragen, BWV 56, for example in 2013 with Ryo Terakado conducting the ensemble il Gardellino. In 2009 Wörner recorded Lieder by Hans Rott, a contemporary of Gustav Mahler. In 2006 he recorded Lieder from Vienna written in the fin de siècle period, titled "Hugo Wolf und der Wiener Jugendstil", by composers such as Alban Berg, Arnold Schoenberg, Franz Schreker and Hugo Wolf, writing the program notes himself. A review of the "ambitious project" noted: "Wörner's quiet but colorful bass-baritone and reflective attitude toward the text are evocative of the small gatherings in which the music of the Second Viennese School took shape". Wörner recorded with his own Ensemble Kirchheimer BachConsort Christoph Graupner's cantatas for epiphany and also Bach's Dialog-cantatas with Hana Blazikova.

Wörner appeared on the opera stage at the Solothurn theatre in the title role of Jean-Jacques Rousseau's Le devin du village, which was recorded conducted by Andreas Reize. He premiered works composed for him, such as Canticum Canticorum by Marco Sofianopoulo, first performed in the Trieste Cathedral, and Werner Jacob's Lamentatio and Triptychon in St. Sebald in Nuremberg, for the broadcaster Bayerischer Rundfunk.

== Awards ==
In 2002 he was awarded first prize at the 13th International Johann Sebastian Bach Competition of Leipzig and a special prize from the Leipzig Baroque Orchestra.
