= Paul Dombrecht =

Belgian oboist (born 1948)

Paul Dombrecht (born 1948, Ostend) is a Belgian oboist performing on period instruments as well as the modern oboe. He appears frequently with other prominent musicians and baroque orchestras.

He is the son of Stefaan Dombrecht, who was organist at Oostende. In addition to being an oboist, Paul Dombrecht is active as conductor and artistic director of the baroque orchestra Il Fondamento, the wind ensemble Octophoros and the Paul Dombrecht Consort.

Dombrecht is also a virtuoso on the modern oboe, performing the complete repertoire for the instrument, including the nineteenth and twentieth centuries.

Dombrecht has an extensive discography with recordings made for the music labels Seon, Harmonia Mundi, Astrée, Opus 111, Accent, Vanguard, Passacaille and Fuga Libera.

He is a professor in the Royal Conservatory of Brussels and holds masterclasses in Spain, Italy, Turkey, Germany, Greece and Israel.

== Partial discography ==
- Juan Crisóstomo Arriaga (1806–1826). O salutaris Hostia. Stabat Mater dolorosa. Air d’Oedipe à Colone. Herminie. Air de Médée. Duo de Ma Tante Aurore. Agar dans le desert. Il Fondamento, Paul Dombrecht. Fuga Libera FUG515. 2005
