= Royal Academy of Music Bach Prize =

- Awarded for: "an individual who has made an outstanding contribution to the performance and/or scholarly study of the music of Johann Sebastian Bach."
- Sponsored by: Kohn Foundation
- Location: London
- Country: United Kingdom
- Presented by: Royal Academy of Music
- Reward: £10,000
- First award: 2006
- Website: www.ram.ac.uk/about-us/about-the-academy/the-bach-prize

The Royal Academy of Music Bach Prize is an award given by the Royal Academy of Music in London. It is sponsored by the Kohn Foundation, and given to performers and scholars who have made an outstanding contribution to the music of Johann Sebastian Bach. The prize is worth £10,000.

== Recipients ==
- 2006: Christoph Wolff
- 2007: Sir András Schiff
- 2008: Sir John Eliot Gardiner
- 2009: Peter Schreier
- 2010: John Butt
- 2011: Thomanerchor Leipzig
- 2012: Masaaki Suzuki
- 2013: Murray Perahia
- 2014: Ton Koopman
- 2015: Rachel Podger
- 2016: Philippe Herreweghe
