= Ryo Terakado =

Japanese violinist and conductor (born 1961)

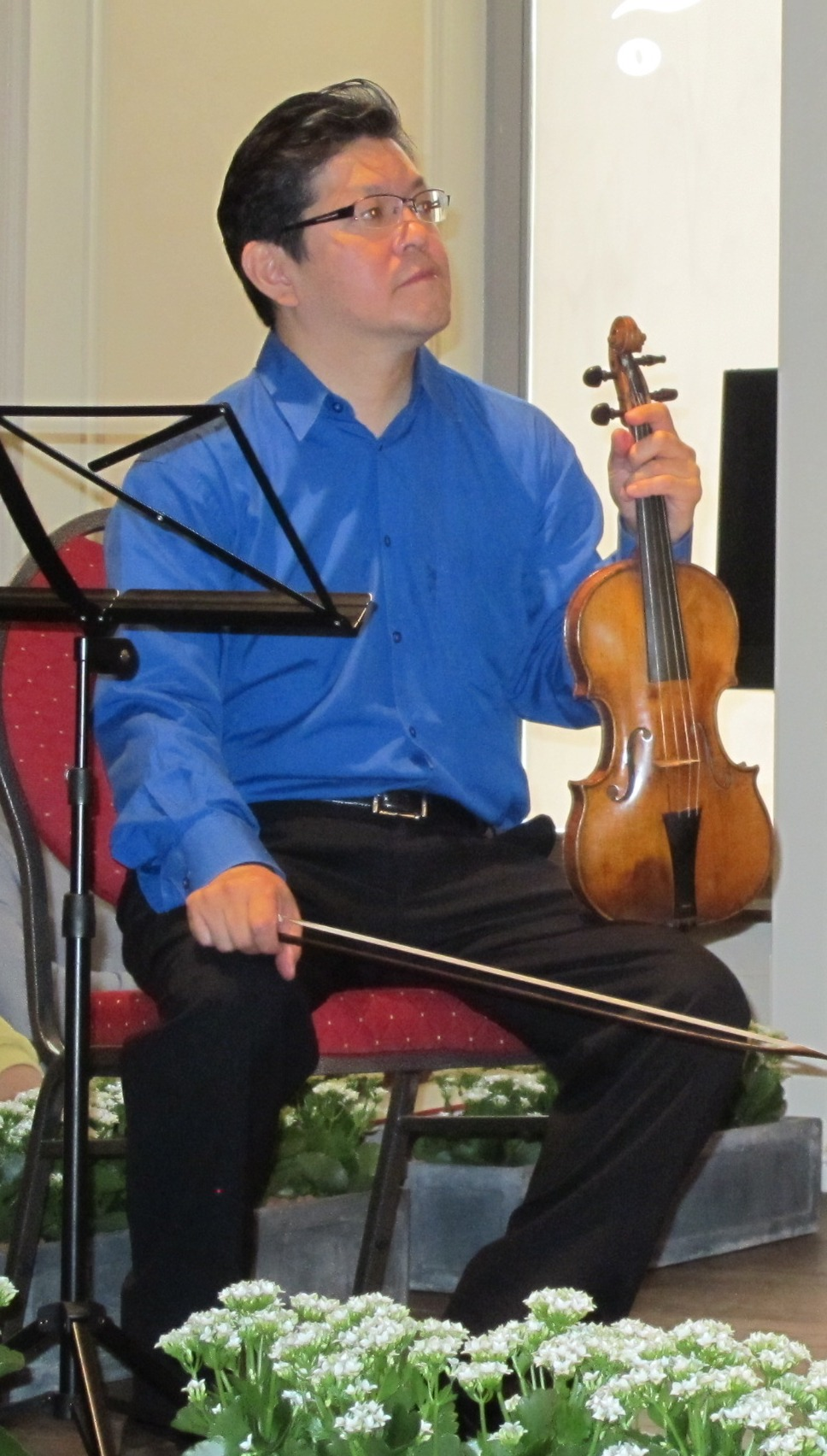
- Terakado in 2013
- Born: 1961 (age 64–65); Santa Cruz, Bolivia
- Education: Toho Gakuen School of Music
- Occupations: Violinist; Violist; Concertmaster; Conductor; Academic teacher
- Organizations: Tokyo Philharmonic Orchestra; Bach Collegium Japan; il Gardellino; Royal Conservatory of The Hague

Ryo Terakado (寺神戸 亮, Terakado Ryō; born 1961 in Santa Cruz, Bolivia) is a Japanese violinist and conductor who specializes in historically informed performance. He also plays the viola, viola d'amore and violoncello da spalla. He has been teaching at the Royal Conservatory of The Hague and the Toho Gakuen School of Music.

== Career ==
Terakado began to study the violin at age four. He won a second prize in the All Japan Youth Musical Competition aged fourteen, and studied at the Tōhō Gakuen Daigaku in Tokyo. In 1984 he became concertmaster of the Tokyo Philharmonic Orchestra.

When he was nineteen, he got interested in the Baroque violin. He studied from 1986 with Sigiswald Kuijken and graduated as a soloist three years later. From 1987, he has performed as concertmaster in several Baroque orchestras in Europe and Japan, including Les Arts Florissants, La Chapelle Royale, Collegium Vocale Gent, La Petite Bande and the Tokyo Bach-Mozart Orchestra. He has been concertmaster of the Bach Collegium Japan which is active in the complete recordings of Bach cantatas, conducted by Masaaki Suzuki, playing not only violin, but also viola and viola d'amore. As concertmaster of il Gardellino, he conducted a recording of Bach solo cantatas for bass with Dominik Wörner, such as Ich will den Kreuzstab gerne tragen, BWV 56. Terakado recorded Bach's sonatas and partitas for solo violin, and also his Cello Suites, playing them on a violoncello da spalla, a small cello played braced against the shoulder.

As a conductor, he has performed Baroque operas such as Purcell's Dido und Aeneas and The Fairy Queen, Rameau's Pigmalion and excerpts of operas by Jean-Baptiste Lully and Mozart.

He has been a teacher at the Royal Conservatory of The Hague and the Toho Gakuen School of Music.
