= Wieland Kuijken =

Belgian musician (born 1938)

Wieland Kuijken (Dutch: [ˈʋilɑnt ˈkœykə(n)]; born 31 August 1938 in Dilbeek) is a Belgian musician and player of the viola da gamba and baroque cello.

== Biography ==
Kuijken started his career in music in 1952 with the Brussels Alariusensemble of which he formed part until 1972. In addition, he played with the Ensemble Musique Nouvelle which propagated avant-garde music throughout Europe.

In 1972 the ensemble La Petite Bande was established and later the Kuijken Strijkkwartet (Kuijken String Quartet). Kuijken has recorded numerous works of chamber music with Gustav Leonhardt, Frans Brüggen and Alfred Deller. Today he is one of the most sought-after Early Music performers of his generation on the baroque cello and viola da gamba.

Wieland Kuijken is gamba teacher at the conservatories of Brussels and The Hague and regular jury member of international competitions.

Kuijken has two brothers, Sigiswald and Barthold, who are also eminent musicians and are known for playing baroque music on authentic instruments. Sigiswald is a violinist and Barthold a flautist and recorder player. His third brother is Professor Eckhart Kuijken, former director of the Flemish Institute for Nature Conservation and a professor at Groningen University. He also has a fourth brother, Oswald Kuijken, who is a famous visual artist.
