= Michael Schneider (conductor) =

German recorder player, flautist, conductor, academic

- Born: 10 August 1953 (age 72); Nordhorn, West Germany
- Education: Hochschule für Musik Köln
- Occupations: Flautist; Recorder player; Conductor; Academic teacher
- Organizations: La Stagione; Hochschule der Künste Berlin; University of Music and Performing Arts, Frankfurt
- Awards: ARD International Music Competition

Michael Schneider (born 10 August 1953) is a German flautist, recorder player, conductor and academic teacher. He is especially connected with later Baroque repertoire such as the works of Telemann and with early Classical repertoire such as the works of Carl Philipp Emanuel Bach, and founded the orchestra La Stagione to perform and record such repertoire.

== Career ==
Schneider was born in Nordhorn. He studied flute and recorder at the Musikhochschule Köln. In 1978 he was a winner of the ARD International Music Competition in the recorder category.

For historically informed performances he founded in 1979 the ensemble "Camerata Köln" (Camerata Cologne) and in 1988 the orchestra "La Stagione". He conducted both in performances and many recordings. They appeared at the Handel Festival in Göttingen, the Handel Festival in Halle, the Bachfest Leipzig, the Schwetzingen Festival and the Schleswig-Holstein Musik Festival, among others.

Schneider also conducted orchestras such as the Nordwestdeutsche Philharmonie, the Cappella Coloniensis, the Zurich Chamber Orchestra and the Israel Chamber Orchestra.

In 1980 Schneider was appointed professor for recorder at the Berlin University of the Arts. Since 1993 he has been professor of the University of Music and Performing Arts, Frankfurt, where he established in 2005 a class for "Historische Interpretationspraxis" (historically informed interpretation). Since 2005 he has served as a vice president of the university. In 2011 he appeared with about 50 students and teachers from the university at the Rheingau Musik Festival in Eberbach Abbey, including first a variety of chamber music concerts in smaller halls of the former monastery, performed by a piano quintet, a string quartet and a trumpet trio, and finally a semi-staged presentation of Alessandro Stradella's oratorio San Giovanni Battista in the Basilika.

== Selected recordings ==
Schneider recorded especially the works of Telemann, both as a player and conductor, including his wind concertos (6 volumes), recorder concertos, orchestral suites, Trauermusik (funeral music) for Karl VII, Trauermusik for Hamburg's mayor Garlieb Sillem and the Hamburgische Kapitänsmusik (1755). He recorded the oratorio Der aus der Löwengrube erettete Daniel, the comic opera Don Quichotte auf der Hochzeit des Comacho, the opera Damon and the one-act Pimpinone.

From the Italian Baroque, he recorded Stradella's Christmas cantatas, Vivaldi's recorder concertos, Geminiani concertos, and a Scarlatti recital with Dimitri Egorov. He conducted the operas Piramo e Tisbe by Johann Adolph Hasse and Handel's Rodelinda.

He recorded Bach's solo cantatas for bass with Gotthold Schwarz, the Thomanerchor and La Stagione, BWV 56, 82 and 158.

Schneider's recordings of early classical repertoire include C. P. E. Bach's Magnificat and the Magnificat setting by his brother, Johann Christian Bach, on a Capriccio CD, Mozart arias with Ruth Ziesak, Simon Le Duc's symphonies, Carl Friedrich Abel's flute concertos, chamber music, piano concertos, symphonies, Franz Ignaz Beck's symphonies, Georg Anton Benda's harpsichord concertos, Matthias Georg Monn's cello concertos and Josef Martin Kraus' Requiem, Haydn]s L'anima del filosofo and Ignaz Holzbauer's Günther von Schwarzburg.

== Awards ==
In 2000 Schneider was awarded the Telemann Prize of Magdeburg. His recording of Telemann's opera Damon with La Stagione was the "Critic's Choice" of Gramophone in 1998.
