= Roel Dieltiens =

Belgian cellist and composer

Roel Dieltiens (born 1956) is a Belgian cellist and composer. Dieltiens plays both Baroque and modern cello. Dieltiens grew up in a musical family and initially studied piano. At the age of fifteen, just as he was about to give up music, his elder brother encouraged him to try the cello. He immediately fell in love with the instrument. Three years later he won First Prize at the Royal Flemish Conservatory in Antwerp, Belgium.

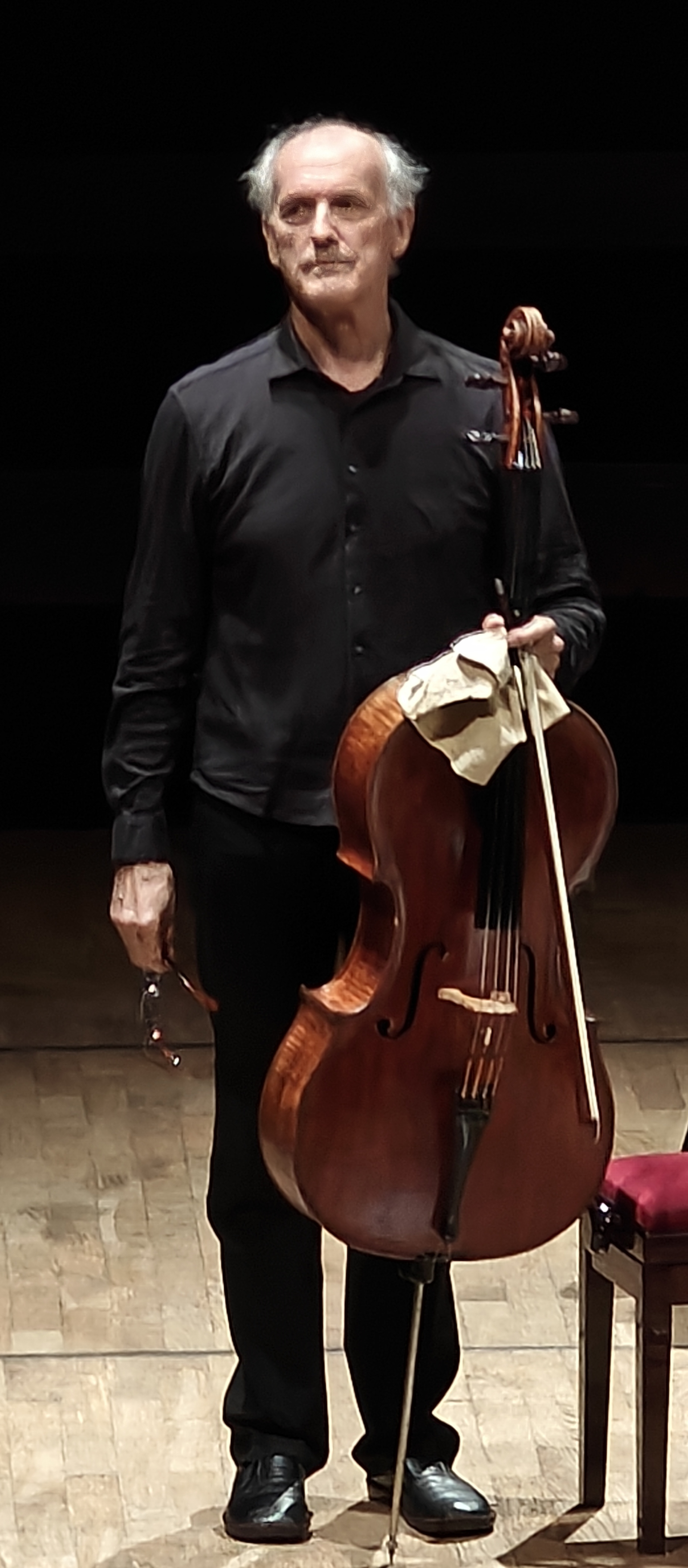
Roel Dieltiens (2026)

== Studies and degrees ==
Dieltiens continued his studies at the Chapelle musicale Reine Élisabeth in Waterloo, Belgium. He also studied with André Messens in Antwerp, Belgium, with André Navarra in Detmold, Germany and with Pierre Fournier in Geneva, Switzerland. He received a diploma from the Akademie für Solisten in Wolfenbüttel, Germany and a Diploma d'Onore from the Accademia Chigiana in Siena, Italy.

== Interest in baroque, contemporary, and ethnic music ==
Dieltiens played with the violinist André Gertler, the clarinetist Walter Boeykens and the countertenor and conductor René Jacobs. He became the latter's regular continuo cellist.

Several contemporary composers, including Luc Van Hove and William Bolcom, have asked Dieltiens to give first performances of their works. He has also collaborated with Victor Legley and Jacqueline Fontyn.

Dieltiens has performed and recorded as a member of the chamber music ensemble, Explorations. Dieltiens has also performed with the Hungarian ethnic music group Muzsikás.

== Compositions for contemporary dance ==
Along with the choreographer Alain Platel of les ballets C de la B (formerly called Les Ballets Contemporains de la Belgique), Dieltiens created Iets (iets) op Bach. Iets op Bach, which translates loosely as "A Little Something set to Bach", won a Time Out Live Award in London, England in 1998 and a Masque d'Or de la Production Etrangère (Golden Mask for a Foreign Production) award in 1999.

Dieltiens continued his association with Les Ballets C de la B, playing a "fabulously strange and discordant accompaniment" to Les Ballets C de la B's Rien de Rien in 2001.

== Awards ==
Other awards Dieltiens has won include a Caecilia Award in Belgium and a Diapason d'Or in France.

== Discography ==
Recordings include:

- J.S. Bach: Complete Cello Suites
- Vivaldi: Cello Sonatas, Cello Concertos
- Tartini: Concertos
- Italian Cello Music: Domenico Gabrielli, Benedetto Marcello, Giovanni Bononcini, Alessandro Scarlatti D, Willem de Fesch, Francesco Geminiani
- Wolfgang Amadeus Mozart: Flute Quartets
- Bach, C.P.E. - Cello Concertos Wq 170, 171 & 172 - Orchestra of the Eighteenth Century

== Teaching and competitions ==
Dieltiens teaches at the Musikhochschule Hochschule für Musik und Theater in Zürich, Switzerland. Dieltiens is frequently invited to serve as a jury member in competitions such as the International Johann Sebastian Bach Competition in Leipzig, the Queen Elizabeth Competition in Brussels, and the Tchaikowski Competition in Moscow.
