= Marcel Ponseele =

Belgian oboist

Marcel Ponseele (born 1957 in Kortrijk) is a Belgian oboist. He is known for his performances of Bach. In 2025 he was awarded the Bach Medal of Leipzig.

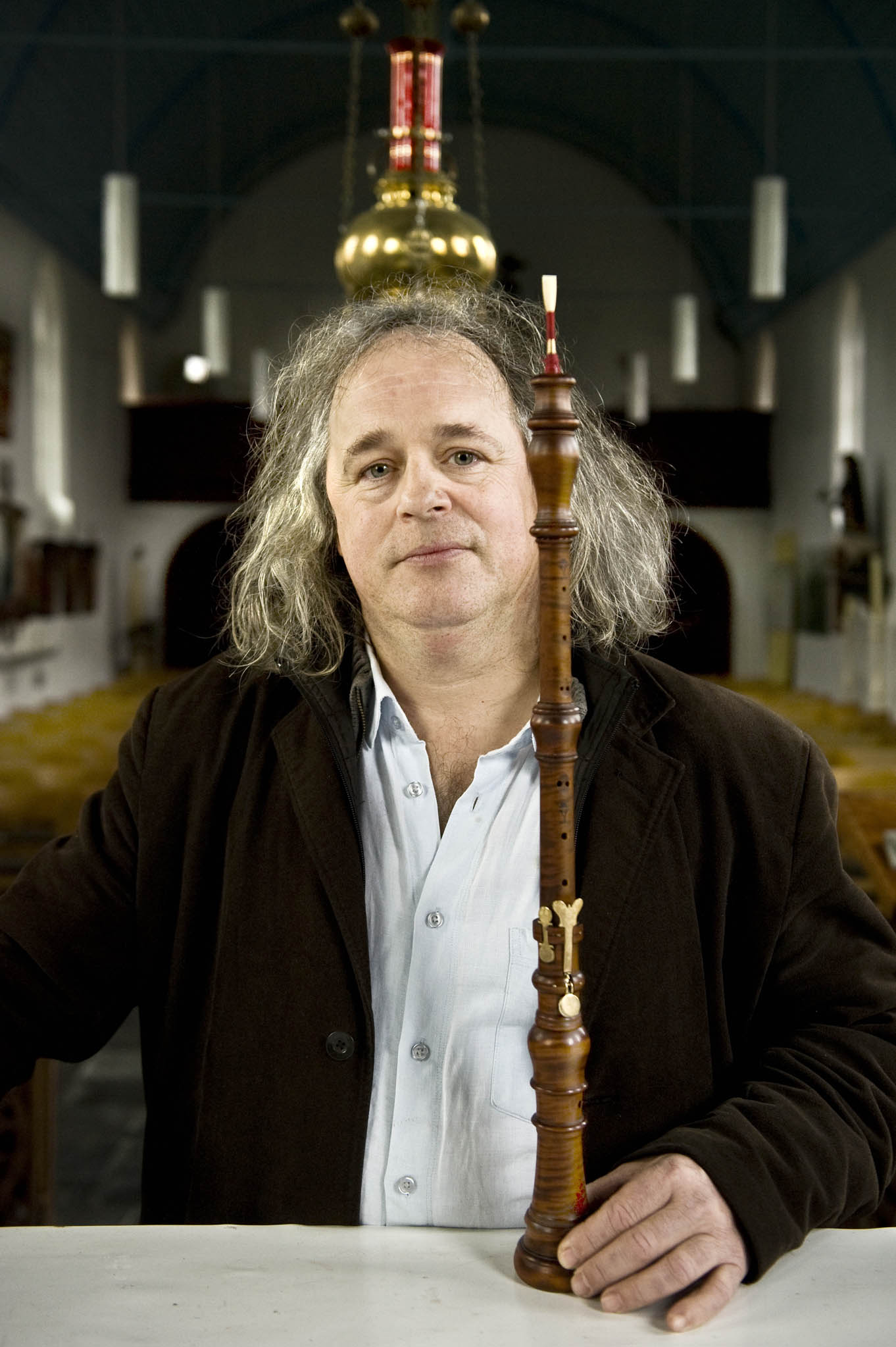

Ponseele studied at Bruges and other conservatories in Belgium. He has specialised in the baroque oboe and is involved in making his own instruments in 18th-century style.

== Discography ==
He has made a number of recordings as a soloist, playing baroque oboe and related instruments such as the oboe d'amore. His Bach recordings include oboe solos in sets of cantatas conducted by John Eliot Gardiner, Ton Koopman and others.

== See also ==
- il Gardellino
