= Josef Loibl =

German baritone

- Born: 1939 (age 85–86); Berlin
- Education: Musikhochschule München
- Occupations: Baritone; Academic voice teacher
- Organizations: University of Music and Performing Arts Graz; Musikhochschule München

Josef Loibl (born 1939) is a German baritone and singing teacher.

== Life ==
Loibl was born in Schönbrunn, Baden-Württemberg. He studied at the Musikhochschule München, voice with the baritone Karl Schmitt-Walter and composition with Hermann Reutter. His technique is based in many areas on the voice-physiological knowledge of Frederick Husler and Yvonne Rodd-Marlings. He won a prize at the competition of Hertogenbosch, which caused international recognition and appearances. He worked exclusively in Lieder, cantata and oratorio repertoire.

His focus was the interpretation of Lieder. With his accompanists, including Hermann Reutter, Erik Werba, Jörg Demus, Helmut Deutsch, Norman Shetler and Fabio Luisi, he worked on numerous programs. Many of them were also recorded. In the field of oratorio, Loibl has performed the entire repertoire from baroque to contemporary.

For many years, Loibl was professor for voice at the University of Music and Performing Arts Graz. At the same time, he was head of a singing class as professor at the Musikhochschule München. He trained many notable singers including Annette Dasch, Mihoko Fujimura and Violeta Urmana. He has worked with singers especially in productions of the demanding stage works of Richard Wagner and Giuseppe Verdi. Loibl is regarded as one of the most renowned vocal teachers in Germany, and regularly gives master classes.

== Recordings ==
Loibl's CD recordings have been released at Fono Münster and Schwann. His recordings include:

Lieder:

- Schubert – Wolf (Goethe Lieder) with pianists Erik Werba and Norman Shetler
- Brahms – Wolf (selected Lieder) with Shetler
- Josef Loibl singt Balladen, ballads by Schubert, Loewe, Brahms, Mahler and Pfitzner, with pianists Fabio Luisi and Gerhard Zeller
- Schumann Op. 24 and Op. 35, with Shetler
- Mendelssohn (selected Lieder), with Luisi
- Schumann (Dichterliebe) – Schubert (selected Lieder), with pianists Rolf Koenen and Werba, 2009

Other:

- Bach (solo cantatas), with Munich Chamber Orchestra conducted by Hans Stadlmair
- Mozart (concert arias), with Münchner Kammerorchester, conducted by Luisi
