= La Chapelle Royale =

French ensemble of baroque music

La Chapelle Royale is a French ensemble of baroque music.

== History ==
La Chapelle Royale was founded in 1977 in Paris by the Belgian conductor Philippe Herreweghe. It takes its name from the Chapelle royale of the French kings.

The initial vocation of the ensemble was to interpret the great French repertoire of the 17th century (Henri Dumont, Jean-Baptiste Lully, Marc-Antoine Charpentier, André Campra, Jean Gilles...) but, since 1985, Herreweghe associated it more and more with his own Belgian ensemble, the Collegium Vocale Gent.

Next to La Chapelle Royale, Philippe Herreweghe also founded the "Ensemble Vocal Européen de la Chapelle Royale".

La Chapelle Royale was, during the 1980s, together with Les Arts Florissants, one of the pillars of the musical revolution known in France and Belgium under the name of "Baroqueux" (see Historically informed performance or "performance on period instruments"), initiated during the 1970s by Nikolaus Harnoncourt and Gustav Leonhardt.

== Recordings ==
=== La Chapelle Royale ===
- 1981 : Motets pour la Chapelle du roy, Henry Du Mont
- 1984 : Les Indes galantes, Jean-Philippe Rameau
- 1985 : Grands Motets, Jean-Baptiste Lully
- 1985 : Motet Pour l'Offertoire de la Messe Rouge et Miserere H.219, Marc-Antoine Charpentier
- 1986 : Motets, Josquin des Prez
- 1987 : Musikalische Exequien, Heinrich Schütz
- 1987 : Requiem, André Campra
- 1988 : Messe de Requiem op.48 - orchestration originale, Gabriel Fauré et Messe des Pêcheurs de Villerville, Gabriel Fauré / André Messager (La Chapelle Royale, Les Petits Chanteurs de Saint-Louis, Ensemble Musique Oblique)
- 1990 : Requiem, Jean Gilles
- 1991 : Cantates pour basse BWV 82, 56 et 128, Johann Sebastian Bach

=== La Chapelle Royale with Collegium Vocale Gent ===
- 1983 : Motets, Johannes Brahms (Chapelle Royale, Collegium Vocale)
- 1984 : Motets & Psalms, Felix Mendelssohn-Bartholdy (Chapelle Royale, Collegium Vocale)
- 1985 : Matthäus Passion BWV 244, Johann Sebastian Bach (Chapelle Royale, Collegium Vocale)
- 1986 : Grand Motets, Johann Sebastian Bach (Chapelle Royale, Collegium Vocale, Orchestre de la Chapelle Royale)
- 1987 : Vespro della Beata Vergina, Claudio Monteverdi (Chapelle Royale, Collegium Vocale, Saqueboutiers de Toulouse)
- 1988 : Johannes Passion BWV 245, Johann Sebastian Bach (Collegium Vocale, Orchestre de la Chapelle Royale)
- 1990 : Cantate Am Abend aber desselbigen Sabbats BWV 42, Johann Sebastian Bach (Chapelle Royale, Collegium Vocale)
- 1990 : Magnificat BWV 243, Johann Sebastian Bach (Chapelle Royale, Collegium Vocale)

=== La Chapelle Royale with Collegium Vocale Gent and Orchestre des Champs Elysées ===
- 1992 : Große Messe in c-Moll, Wolfgang Amadeus Mozart (Chapelle Royale, Collegium Vocale, Orchestre des Champs Elysées)
- 1993 : Elias, Felix Mendelssohn (Chapelle Royale, Collegium Vocale, Orchestre des Champs Elysées)
- 1994 : Ein Sommernachtstraum, Die Hebriden, Felix Mendelssohn (Chapelle Royale, Collegium Vocale, Orchestre des Champs Elysées)
- 1995 : Missa solemnis, Ludwig van Beethoven (Chapelle Royale, Collegium Vocale, Orchestre des Champs Elysées)
- 1996 : Paulus, Felix Mendelssohn (Chapelle Royale, Collegium Vocale, Orchestre des Champs Elysées)
- 1996 : Ein deutsches Requiem op.45, Johannes Brahms (Chapelle Royale, Collegium Vocale, Orchestre des Champs Elysées)
- 1997 : L'enfance du Christ, Hector Berlioz (Chapelle Royale, Collegium Vocale, Orchestre des Champs Elysées)
- 1998 : Szenen aus Goethes Faust, Robert Schumann (Chapelle Royale, Collegium Vocale, Orchestre des Champs Elysées)

=== Ensemble Vocal Européen de la Chapelle Royale ===
- 1989 : Les Lamentations de Jérémie, Roland de Lassus
- 1992 : Missa Viri Galilei, Palestrina

All these recordings have been published by Harmonia Mundi.
