= Passacaille (record label) =

Passacaille records is a Belgian classical music record label, owned by Musurgia BVBA, (Note: "Besloten Vennootschap met Beperkte aansprakelijkheid" (private company with limited liability or Ltd.)) based in Halle, Belgium. The company's artistic director is the flautist and flute-maker Jan De Winne.
