= Il Gardellino =

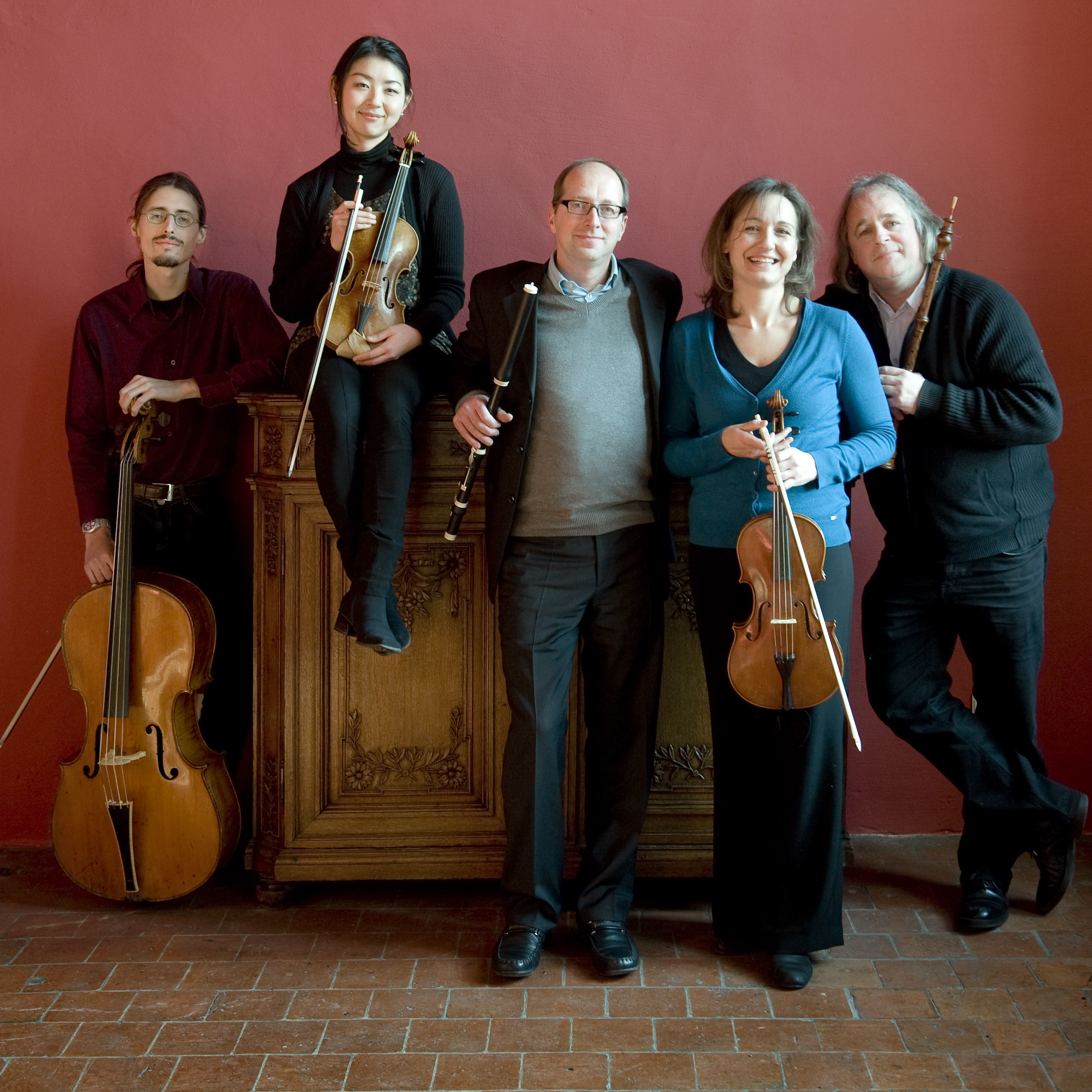
The ensemble in Damme in 2012

il Gardellino is a Flemish Baroque music ensemble founded in 1988 by oboist Marcel Ponseele and flutist Jan De Winne. The name was derived from a piece by Vivaldi named after the goldfinch (gardellino in Italian). The ensemble plays on period instruments in historically informed performances. The ensemble focus on works by Johann Sebastian Bach and his contemporaries Johann Friedrich Fasch, Carl Heinrich Graun, Handel, Johann Gottlieb Janitsch, Telemann and Vivaldi.

The group performed at the 2013 Festival of Flanders and the 2015 Bucharest Early Music Festival.

== See also ==
- Ryo Terakado
