= Philippe Herreweghe =

Belgian conductor (born 1947)

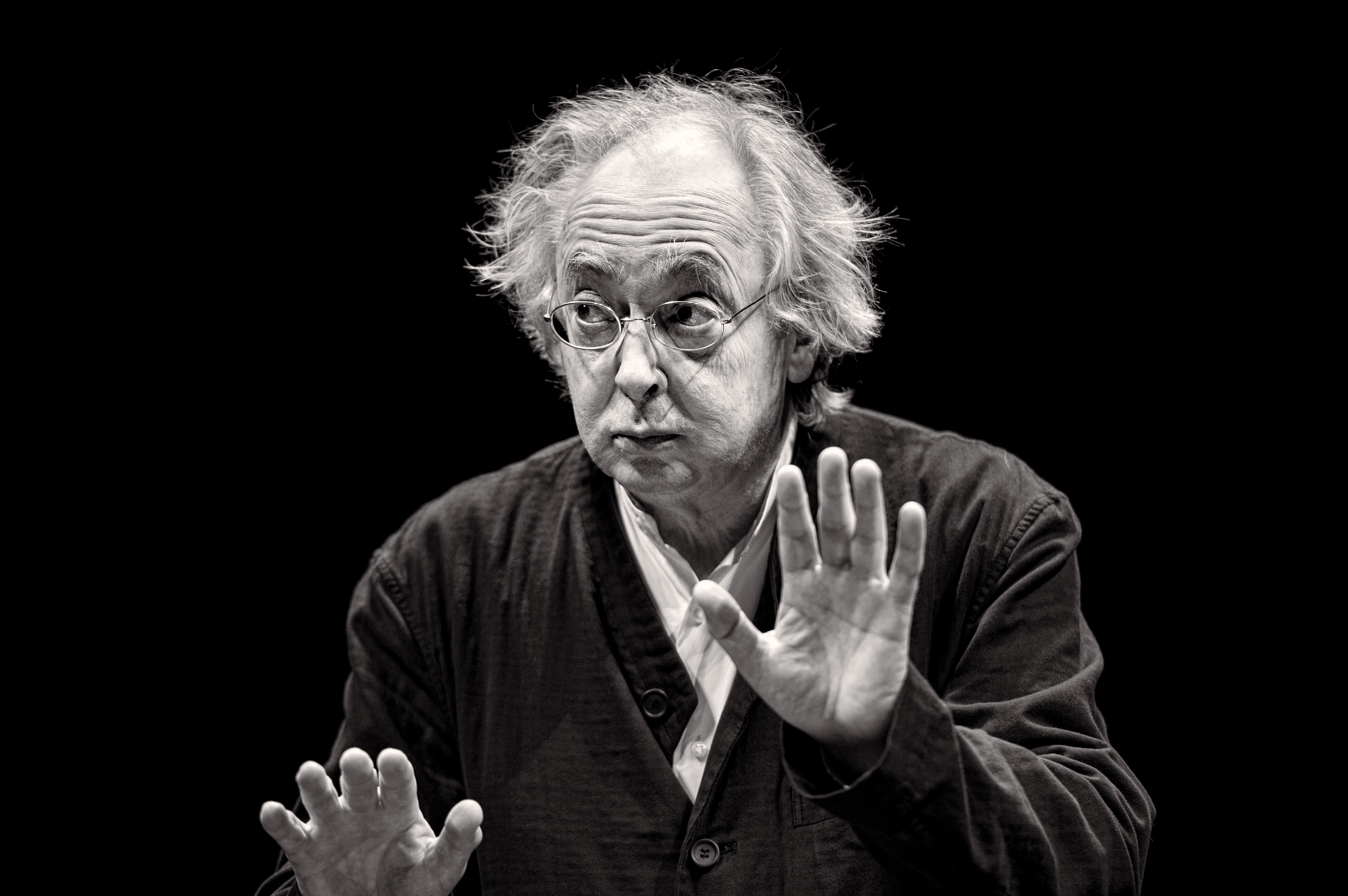
Herreweghe conducting (2011)

Philippe Maria François Herreweghe, Knight Herreweghe (born 2 May 1947) is a Belgian conductor and choirmaster.

Herreweghe founded La Chapelle Royale and Collegium Vocale Gent and is renowned as a conductor, with a repertoire ranging from Renaissance to early Romantic classical music. He specialises in Baroque music, with a particular focus on the music of Johann Sebastian Bach.

== Early life ==
Herreweghe was born in Ghent as the first of three children to Edward Raymond Frans (1919–2006) and Elza Maria Augusta Herreweghe (née van Herrewege; 1919–1976). He received his first piano lessons from his mother.

In his school years at the University of Ghent, Herreweghe combined studies in medical science and psychiatry with a musical education at the Ghent Conservatory, where Marcel Gazelle, Yehudi Menuhin's accompanist, was his piano teacher.

== Career ==
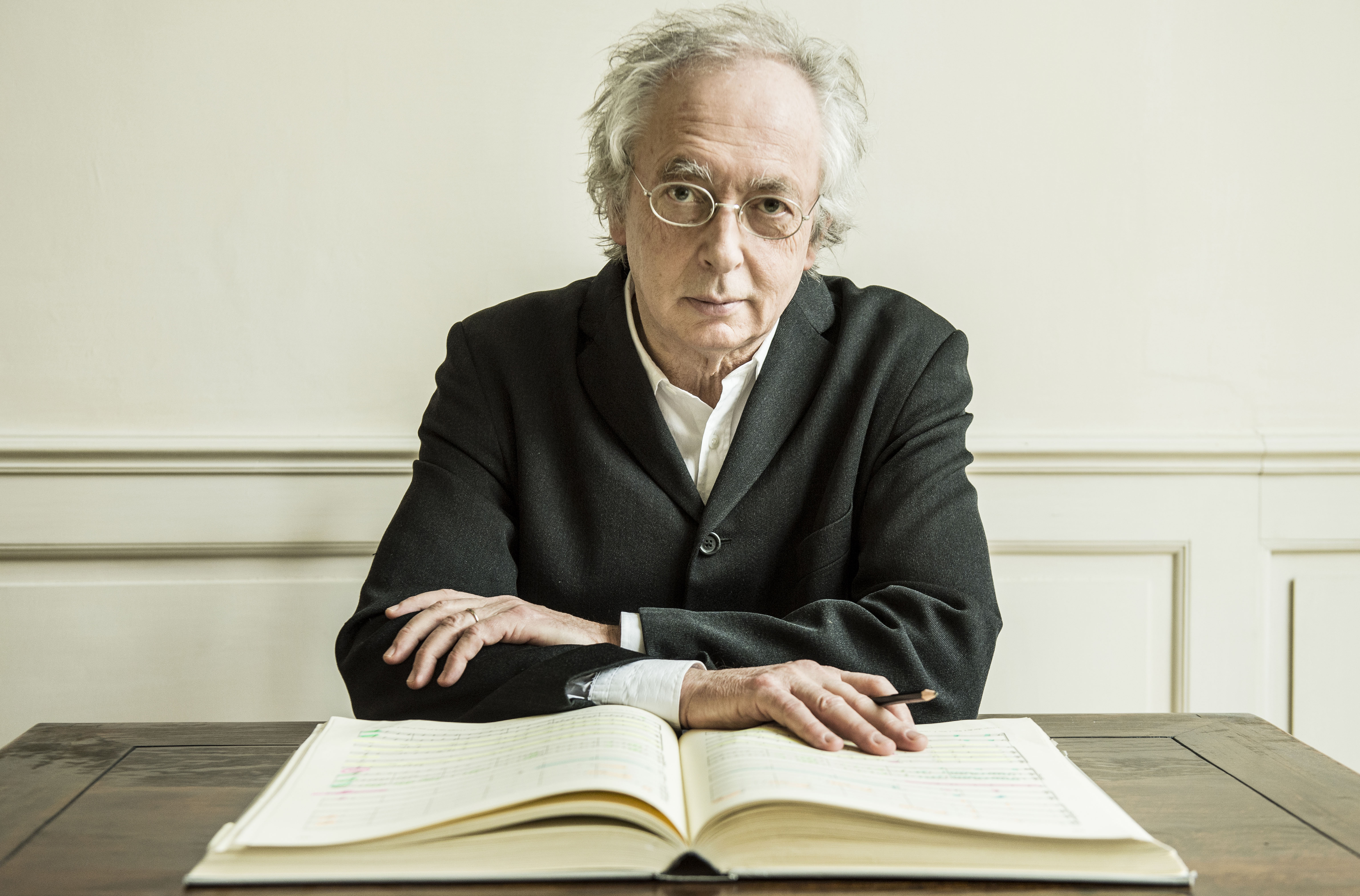
Herreweghe (2013)

In 1970, Herreweghe founded the Collegium Vocale Gent with a group of fellow students. Nikolaus Harnoncourt and Gustav Leonhardt took notice of his musical approach and invited him and the Collegium Vocale Gent to join them in their recordings of the complete Bach cantatas.

Herreweghe's approach to Baroque music was soon drawing praise and in 1977 he founded another ensemble in Paris, La Chapelle Royale, to perform the music of the French Golden Age, Campra, Lully, Charpentier, Delalande, Dumont, Gille. From 1982 to 2002 he was artistic director of the Académies Musicales de Saintes.

During this period, Herreweghe started several other groups and ensembles with whom he made historically appropriate and well-thought-out interpretations of repertoire stretching from the Renaissance to contemporary music. They include the Ensemble Vocal Européen, specialised in Renaissance polyphony, and the Orchestre des Champs Élysées, founded in 1991 with the aim of playing Classical and Romantic repertoire on original instruments.

Since 2009, Herreweghe and Collegium Vocale Gent have been actively working on the development of a large European-level symphonic choir, at the invitation of the prestigious Accademia Chigiana in Siena and since 2011 with the support of the European Union's Cultural Programme.

For some time Herreweghe has been active performing the great symphonic works, from Beethoven to Gustav Mahler. He has been principal conductor of the Antwerp Symphony Orchestra since 1997.

As a guest conductor, Herreweghe has conducted a number of well-known orchestras, including the Royal Concertgebouw Orchestra, the Stavanger Symphony Orchestra, the Rotterdam Philharmonic, the Dutch Broadcasting Orchestra, the Mahler Chamber Orchestra, the Berlin and Vienna Philharmonic Orchestras, and the Antwerp Symphony Orchestra. He was artistic director of the Festival of Saintes and was permanent guest conductor of the Netherlands Radio Chamber Philharmonic from 2008 to 2013.

Herreweghe is principally known as a conductor of the music of Johann Sebastian Bach. He is regarded by leading Bach scholars today as a founding father of the Baroque authentic practice, original-instrument movement and one of record label Harmonia Mundi's most prolific recording artists, with over 60 albums to his name. In 2005, he was featured in BBC's Bach Christmas broadcasts.

Ted Libbey notes Herreweghe's "special way with voices", particularly praising his "beautifully paced and coherent realization" of the Mass in B Minor.

He is married to Ageet Zweistra.

== Selected discography ==
Over the years, Herreweghe has built up an extensive discography of more than 100 recordings with these ensembles, on such labels as Harmonia Mundi, Virgin Classics and Pentatone. Highlights include the Lagrime di San Pietro of Lassus, Bach's St Matthew Passion, the complete symphonies of Beethoven and Schumann, Mahler's song cycle Des Knaben Wunderhorn, Berlioz's L'enfance du Christ & Les nuits d'été, Bruckner's Symphony No. 5, Fauré's Requiem (1988 & 1901), Schoenberg's Pierrot lunaire, Weill's Violin Concerto, Berliner Requiem; Cantate vom Tod im Wald and Stravinsky's Symphony of Psalms. In 2010 he founded together with Outhere Music his own label, φ (PHI). Since then these recordings have been published:

- 2010: MAHLER, Gustav: Symphony no. 4 (LPH 001)
- 2011: BACH, Johann Sebastian: Motets BWV 225–230 (LPH 002)
- 2011: BRAHMS, Johannes: Werke für Chor und Orchester (LPH 003)
- 2011: BACH, Johann Sebastian: Mass in B minor (LPH 004)
- 2011: DE VICTORIA, Tomas Luis: Officium Defunctorum (LPH 005)
- 2012: BACH, Johann Sebastian: Ach süsser Trost (LPH 006)
- 2012: BEETHOVEN, Ludwig van: Missa Solemnis (LPH 007)
- 2012: DVORAK, Antonin: Stabat Mater (LPH 009)
- 2012: GESUALDO, Carlo: Responsoria 1611 (LPH 010)
- 2012: MOZART, Wolfgang Amadeus: The Last Symphonies 39, 40 & 41 Jupiter (LPH 011)
- 2013: BACH, Johann Sebastian: Ich elender Mensch – Leipzig Cantates (LPH 012)
- 2013: HAYDN, Joseph: Die Jahreszeiten (LPH 013)
- 2013: BYRD, William: Infelix ego – Mass for 5 voices (LPH 014)
- 2014: DVORAK, Antonin: Requiem (LPH 016)
- 2014: HAYDN, Joseph: Die Schöpfung (LPH 018)
- 2014: SCHUBERT, Franz: Symphonies 1, 3 & 4 (LPH 019)
- 2016: STRAVINSKY, Igor: Threni; Requiem canticles (LPH 020)
- 2016: GESUALDO, Carlo: O dolce mio tesoro (LPH 024)
- 2017: BRAHMS, Johannes: Symphony no. 4; Alt-rhapsodie; Schicksalslied (LPH 025)
- 2017: BACH, Johann Sebastian: Du treuer Gott – Leipzig Cantates (LPH 027)
- 2017: MONTEVERDI, Claudio: Vespro della Beata Vergine (LPH 029)
- 2022: BEETHOVEN, Ludwig van: Christus am Ölberge

=== Recordings for PRIMEPHONIC ===
- Schubert – Symphonies. Philippe Herreweghe, Royal Flemish Philharmonic. PENTATONE PTC 5186446 (2012).
- Beethoven – The 9 Symphonies Philippe Herreweghe, Royal Flemish Philharmonic. PENTATONE PTC 5186312 (2011).
- Mendelssohn Bartholdy – The Piano Concertos & Rondo brilliant. Martin Helmchen, Philippe Herreweghe, Royal Flemish Philharmonic. PENTATONE PTC 5186366 (2011).
- Schubert – Symphony No. 9 in C, D. 944, "The Great". Philippe Herreweghe, Royal Flemish Philharmonic. PENTATONE PTC 5186372 (2011).
- Beethoven – Symphonies Nos. 4 & 7. Philippe Herreweghe, Royal Flemish Philharmonic. PENTATONE PTC 5186315 (2011).
- Stravinsky – Monumentum • Mass & Symphonie de Psaumes, Bach & Stravinsky – Choral-Variationen. Philippe Herreweghe, Royal Flemish Philharmonic, Collegium Vocale Gent. PENTATONE PTC 5186349 (2010)
- Beethoven – Symphony No. 9 "Choral" Philippe Herreweghe, Christiane Oelze, Ingeborg Danz, Christoph Strehl, David Wilson-Johnson, Royal Flemish Philharmonic, Collegium Vocale Gent, Academia Chigiana Siena. PENTATONE PTC 5186317 (2010).
- Beethoven – Symphonies Nos. 5 & 8 Philippe Herreweghe, Royal Flemish Philharmonic. PENTATONE PTC 5186316 (2007).
- Beethoven – Symphonies Nos. 2 & 6. Philippe Herreweghe, Royal Flemish Philharmonic PENTATONE PTC 5186314 (2009).
- Beethoven – Symphonies Nos. 1 & 3 Philippe Herreweghe, Royal Flemish Philharmonic. PENTATONE PTC 5186313 (2008).

== Honours and awards ==
=== Honours ===
- 1994: Officier of the Ordre des Arts et des Lettres
- 2000: Created Knight Herreweghe by Royal Decree of King Albert II.
- 2003: Knight of the Legion of Honour.

=== Awards ===
- In 1990 the European music press named him "Musical Personality of the Year".
- Herreweghe and Collegium Vocale Gent were appointed "Cultural Ambassadors of Flanders" in 1993.
- In 1997 he was awarded an honorary doctorate from the Catholic University of Leuven
- In 2010 the city of Leipzig awarded him its Bach-Medaille for his work as a performer of Bach.
- Royal Academy of Music Bach Prize (2016)

Preceded by Grant Llewellyn	Chief Conductor, DeFilharmonie; 1998–2002	Succeeded by Daniele Callegari
