= Sigiswald Kuijken =

Belgian violinist, violist, and conductor

Sigiswald Kuijken (Dutch: [ˌsiɣɪsʋɑlt ˈkœykə(n)]; born 16 February 1944) is a Belgian violinist, violist, and conductor known for playing on period and original instruments.

== Biography ==
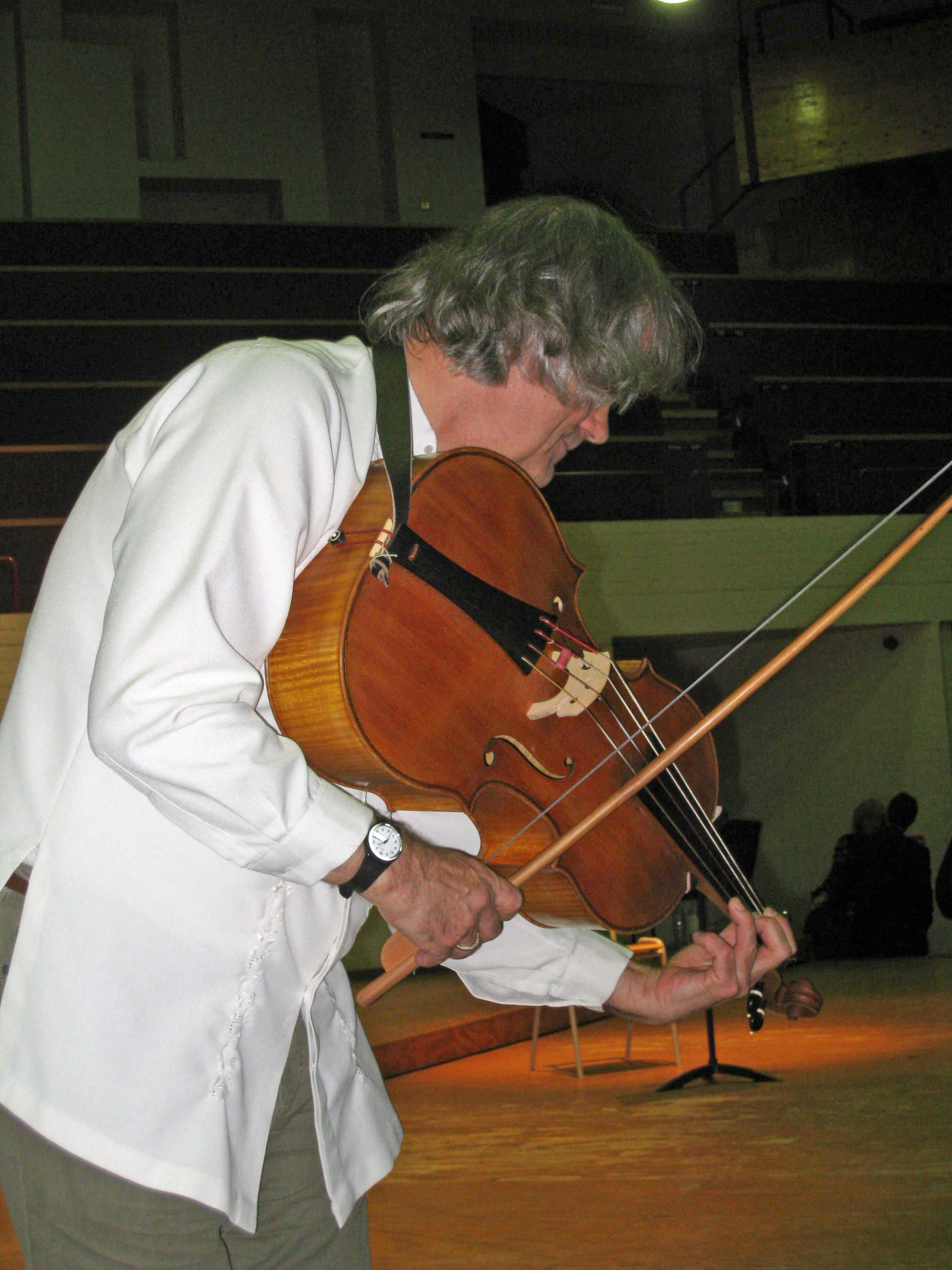
Sigiswald Kuijken with a violoncello da spalla (viola da spalla), 2008

Kuijken was born in Dilbeek, near Brussels. He was a member of the Alarius Ensemble of Brussels between 1964 and 1972 and formed La Petite Bande in 1972. Since 1971 he has taught Baroque violin at the Royal Conservatory of The Hague and the Royal Conservatory of Brussels. He is noted for using the older technique of resting the violin on the shoulder without a shoulder rest, rather than held under the chin. He is a member of the Kuijken String Quartet, which he formed in 1986. In recent years, he has also performed as conductor of symphonies of the Romantic era.

His brothers are also known for historically informed performance: Barthold Kuijken is a flutist and recorder player and Wieland Kuijken, also a member of the Kuijken Quartet, is a cellist and gambist. They all have worked extensively with harpsichordist Gustav Leonhardt.

On 2 February 2007 he was awarded the degree of Doctor Honoris Causa by the Catholic University of Leuven (Katholieke Universiteit Leuven, Belgium).

== Cantatas of J. S. Bach ==
Based on the results of research by Joshua Rifkin and Andrew Parrott on the authentic performance of Bach's masses, cantatas and passions, Sigiswald Kuijken limits the voices to one per part instead of a choir, although Bach himself sometimes extended to eight singers rather than a solo vocal quartet. Kuijken has also reduced the number of instrumentalists performing each cantata.

An example of Sigiswald Kuijken's approach is his recording for Accent Records of a 19-part CD series entitled Cantatas of JS Bach (recorded 2004–2012). The series was favourably received. However, the critic of the Gramophone, reviewing one of the earlier releases, pointed out that the series as projected would not be a complete recording of the cantatas, and expressed the view that Kuijken's small-scale, one voice per part approach works well with some cantatas, but would be less suited to others. Of the specific works reviewed, two featured choral movements, Herr, deine Augen sehen nach dem Glaube, BWV 102 and Wo Gott der Herr nicht bei uns hält, BWV 178.
