= Masaaki Suzuki =

Japanese organist, harpsichordist, and conductor

- 鈴木 雅明
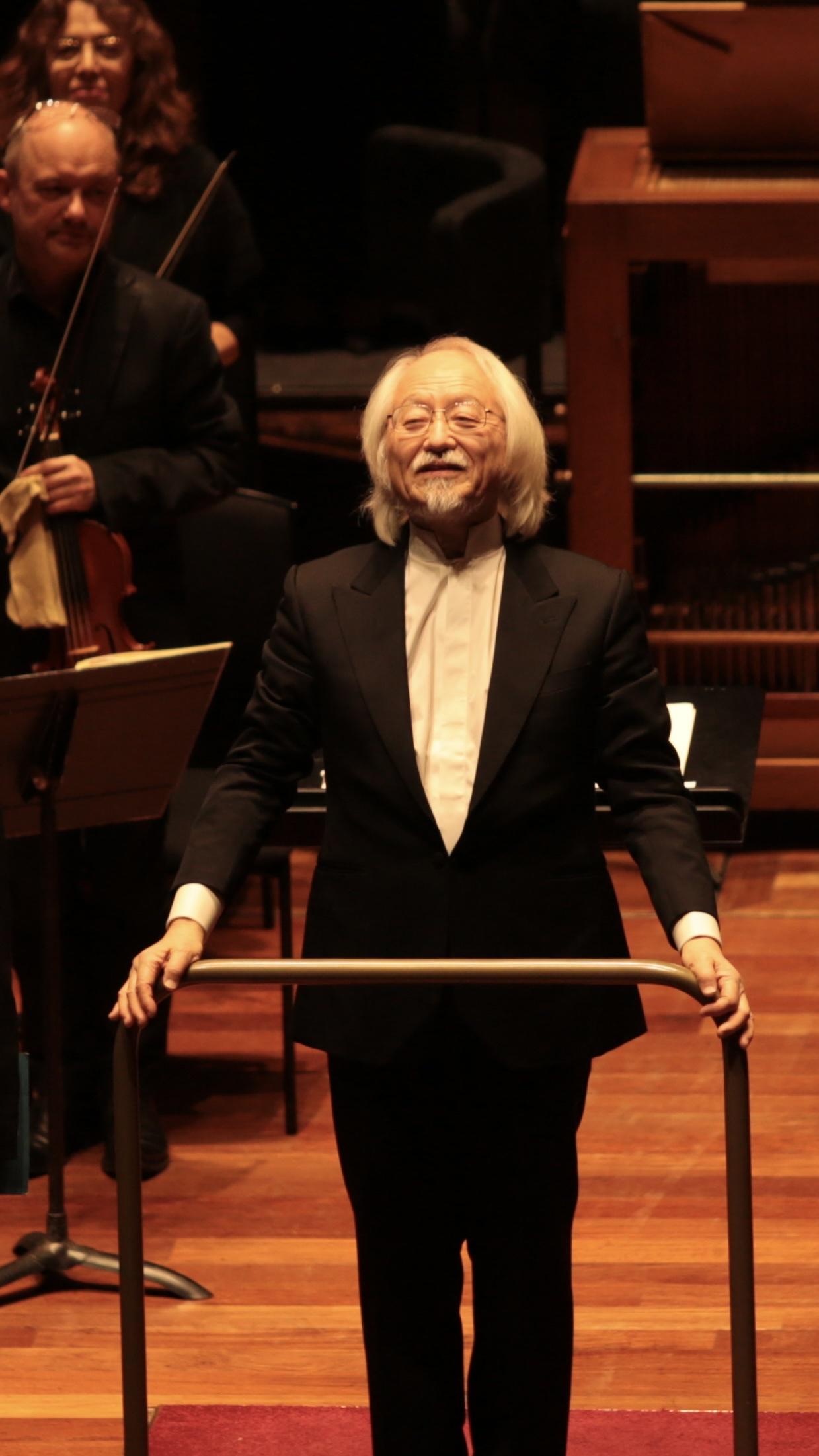
- Masaaki Suzuki in 2023
- Born: 29 April 1954 (age 71); Kobe, Hyōgo Prefecture, Japan
- Education: Tokyo National University of Fine Arts and Music; Sweelinck Conservatory
- Occupations: Conductor; Organist; Harpsichordist; Musicologist
- Organizations: Kobe Shoin Women's University; Bach Collegium Japan; Tokyo National University of Fine Arts and Music; Yale School of Music
- Children: Masato Suzuki (conductor, organist)
- Awards: Federal Order of Merit; Diapason d'Or; BBC Music Magazine; Royal Academy of Music Bach Prize; Bach Medal

Masaaki Suzuki (鈴木 雅明, Suzuki Masaaki; born 29 April 1954) is a Japanese organist, harpsichordist, conductor, and the founder and music director of the Bach Collegium Japan. With this ensemble he is recording the complete choral works of Johann Sebastian Bach for the Swedish label BIS Records, for which he is also recording Bach's concertos, orchestral suites, and solo works for harpsichord and organ. He is also an artist-in-residence at Yale University and the principal guest conductor of its Schola Cantorum, and has conducted orchestras and choruses around the world.

== Biography ==
Suzuki was born in Kobe to parents who were both Protestant Christians and amateur musicians; his father had worked professionally as a pianist. Suzuki has as an adult joined the Reformed Church in Japan, a Calvinist denomination. Masaaki Suzuki began playing organ professionally at church services at the age of 12. He earned degrees in composition and organ at the Tokyo National University of Fine Arts and Music, then earned Soloist Diplomas at the Sweelinck Conservatory in Amsterdam, where he studied harpsichord and organ with Ton Koopman and Piet Kee and improvisation with Klaas Bolt.

From 1981 to 1983 he was a harpsichord instructor at the Staatliche Hochschule für Musik in Duisburg, Germany. In 1983 he returned to Japan, where he began teaching at Kobe Shoin Women's University. In 1990 he founded Bach Collegium Japan, a baroque orchestra and chorus. The group began performing concerts regularly in 1992, and made its first recordings three years later, when they began recording Bach's complete cantatas for the Swedish label BIS Records. They completed the 55-volume series of church cantatas in 2013. They completed Bach's secular cantatas (in 10 albums) in 2018. They have also recorded all of Bach's Lutheran Masses. The ensemble has also recorded all the large choral works of Bach; their St. John Passion and Christmas Oratorio were both selected as Gramophone’s "Recommended Recordings," and the St. John Passion was also winner in the 18th and 19th-century choral music category at the Cannes Classical Awards in 2000. Their recording of Bach's Motets won a German Record Critics’ Award (Preis der deutschen Schallplattenkritik), Diapason d'Or of the Year 2010 and a BBC Music Magazine Award in 2011; their recording of the Mass in B Minor won the Diapason d'Or in 2008.

Suzuki is also currently recording Bach's complete works for solo harpsichord and is one of the few keyboard players to have recorded all four books of Bach's Clavier-Übung (including book 3, which is for organ). He and the Bach Collegium Japan have also recorded the Bach concertos for violin and his Brandenburg Concertos and Orchestral Suites. With his son Masato Suzuki (a harpsichordist, organist, conductor and composer), he and Bach Collegium Japan recently recorded Bach's complete concertos for two harpsichords. He has also begun recording a cycle of Bach's organ music for the BIS label; the first release was in 2015.

Suzuki has also, with the Bach Collegium Japan, recorded the Requiem of Wolfgang Amadeus Mozart and choral music of Johann Rudolf Ahle, Georg Frideric Handel, Jan Dismas Zelenka, Heinrich Schutz, Johann Kuhnau, Marco Giuseppe Peranda, and others. As a soloist he has recorded music of Dietrich Buxtehude and Francois Couperin, among others. He and the Bach Collegium Japan have also recorded the Ninth Symphony of Ludwig van Beethoven in the arrangement by Wagner that replaces the orchestra with a solo piano, which is played on the recording by pianist Noriko Ogawa. With his brother, the baroque cello virtuoso Hidemi Suzuki, he has recorded chamber music by George Frideric Handel and others.

Suzuki is the founder of the early music department at the Tokyo University of the Arts and taught there until 2010. He is now Principal Guest Conductor of the Yale Schola Cantorum and Visiting Professor of Choral Conducting at Yale University in a joint appointment between the Yale School of Music and Yale Institute of Sacred Music, where he is Artist in Residence. As a guest conductor, Suzuki has led the Academy of Ancient Music, the New York Philharmonic, Boston Symphony Orchestra, San Francisco Symphony, St. Paul Chamber Orchestra, Danish National Symphony, Deutsches Symphonie-Orchester Berlin, Orchestra of the Age of Enlightenment, Melbourne Symphony Orchestra, Rotterdam Philharmonic, Radio-Sinfonieorchester Stuttgart, Bergen Philharmonic Orchestra, Philharmonia Baroque, Collegium Vocale Gent, Netherlands Radio Chamber Philharmonic, Tafelmusik Baroque Orchestra and Tonhalle Orchestra of Zurich.

== Awards and honors ==
- 2001: The Cross of the Order of Merit of the Federal Republic of Germany
- 2008: Diapason d'Or (for his recording of Bach's Mass in B minor).
- 2010: Diapason d'Or (for his recording of Bach's Motets)
- 2010: German Record Critics' Award (Preis der deutschen Schallplattenkritik, for his recording of Bach's Motets)
- 2011: Bremen Musikfest Award (for his recording of Bach's Motets)
- 2011: BBC Music Magazine Award (for his recording of Bach's Motets)
- 2012: The Bach Prize, awarded by the Royal Academy of Music and sponsored by the Kohn Foundation
- 2012: Bach Medal from the City of Leipzig and its Bach Archiv
- 2014: Suntory Music Prize
- 2014: ECHO Klassik ‘Editorial Achievement of the Year’ award for his recording of the Bach cantatas
- 2014: Doctorate in Theology (hon) from the Theological University of the Reformed Churches (liberated) in Kampen, Netherlands for his special merit in the interpretation of the cantatas of Johann Sebastian Bach and the explicit connection he makes between Bach’s music and the content of the Christian faith. https://en.tukampen.nl/education/honorary-doctorates/
- 2015: Gutenberg Teaching Award of the University of Mainz
- 2017: Gramophone Classical Music Awards Choral category for his recording of the Great Mass in C minor, K. 427 of Wolfgang Amadeus Mozart
- 2020: Gramophone Classical Music Awards Choral category for his second recording of the St Matthew Passion of Johann Sebastian Bach

== Sources ==
- Notes to performance of Bach's Mass in B minor at the Barbican, London, 30 May 2006.
