= Schmücke dich, o liebe Seele, BWV 180 =

Church cantata by Johann Sebastian Bach

Schmücke dich, o liebe Seele
- BWV 180
- Chorale cantata by J. S. Bach
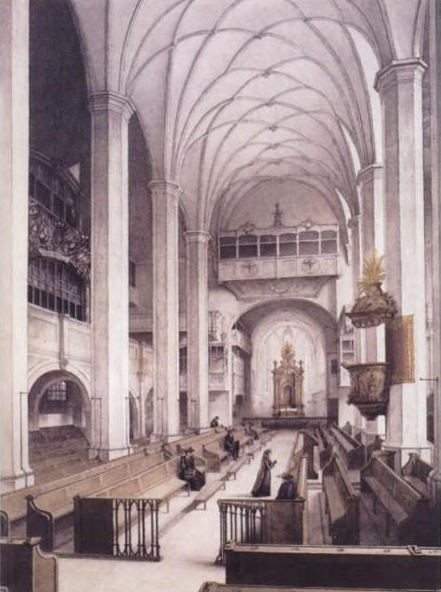
- Thomaskirche, Leipzig
- Occasion: 20th Sunday after Trinity
- Chorale: "Schmücke dich, o liebe Seele" by Johann Franck
- Performed: 22 October 1724: Leipzig
- Movements: 7
- Vocal: SATB choir and soloists
- Instrumental: 2 recorders; flauto traverso; 2 oboes; oboe da caccia; 2 violins; viola; violoncello piccolo; organ; continuo

Johann Sebastian Bach composed the church cantata Schmücke dich, o liebe Seele (Adorn yourself, O dear soul), BWV 180, in Leipzig for the 20th Sunday after Trinity and first performed it on 22 October 1724.

The chorale cantata is based upon Johann Franck's hymn "Schmücke dich, o liebe Seele", with a melody by Johann Crüger, a hymn for the Eucharist. It matches the Sunday's prescribed reading, the Parable of the Great Banquet from the Gospel of Matthew. The first and last stanza are retained unchanged in both text and tune: the former is treated as a chorale fantasia, the latter as a four-part closing chorale. An unknown librettist paraphrased the inner stanzas as recitatives and arias, quoting one stanza of the hymn within a recitative.

Bach scored the cantata for four vocal soloists, a four-part choir, and a Baroque instrumental ensemble of different flutes and oboes, strings and continuo. All movements are set in the major mode, in keeping with the festive text, and several movements resemble dances.

== History and words ==
Bach wrote the cantata in his second year in Leipzig as part of his chorale cantata cycle for the 20th Sunday after Trinity. The prescribed readings for the Sunday were from the Epistle to the Ephesians—"walk circumspectly, ... filled with the Spirit"—(Ephesians 5:15–21), and from the Gospel of Matthew, the Parable of the Great Banquet (Matthew 22:1–14). The German term used in the Luther's Bible translation is Hochzeitsmahl, literally "wedding meal".

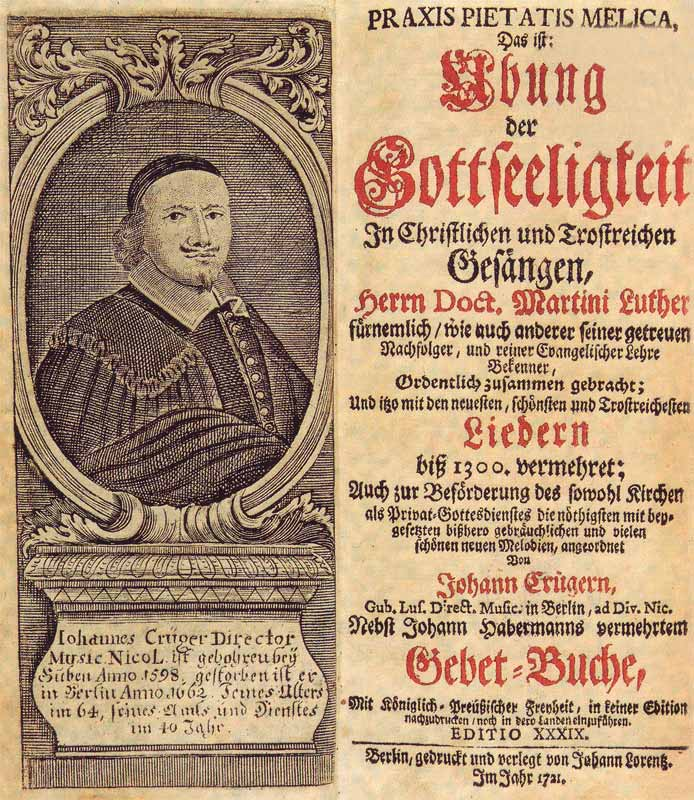
Title of Franck's Praxis pietatis melica

The cantata text is based on the Eucharistic hymn in nine stanzas "Schmücke dich, o liebe Seele" (1649), with a text by Johann Franck and a melody by Johann Crüger, thus connecting the "great banquet" from the gospel to the Abendmahl (Eucharist). The hymn is sung during a service in preparation for the holy communion, and imagines a bride getting ready for her wedding. An unknown author kept the text of the first, middle and last stanzas (1, 4, and 9), and paraphrased the other stanzas to arias and recitatives: stanzas 2 and 7 to arias; stanzas 3, 5–6 and 8 to recitatives. He stayed close to the original and did not seek closer relation to the readings than given by the general context.

Bach composed the cantata subsequent to his chorale prelude of the same name, BWV 654, part of his Great Eighteen Chorale Preludes. He led the first performance of the cantata on 22 October 1724.

He led the Thomanerchor in the first performance on 22 October 1724.

== Music ==
=== Structure and scoring ===
Bach structured the cantata in seven movements. The text and tune of the hymn are kept in the outer choral movements, a chorale fantasia and a four-part closing chorale, which frame a sequence of recitatives and arias, one recitative with a chorale cantus firmus. Bach scored the work for four vocal soloists (soprano, alto, tenor, bass), a four-part choir and a Baroque instrumental ensemble of two recorders (Fl), flauto traverso (Ft), two oboes (Ob), two violins (Vl), viola (Va), violoncello piccolo (Vp) and basso continuo. The title page of the autograph score reads: "CONCERTO. / Dominica 20 post Trinit: / Schmücke dich o liebe Seele etc. / a 4 Voci / Traversiere / 2 Flauti. / 2 Hautbois / 2 Violini / Viola. / Continuo / di / Signore / Joh:Seb:Bach."

In the following table of the movements, the scoring follows the Neue Bach-Ausgabe. The keys and time signatures are taken from Alfred Dürr's standard work Die Kantaten von Johann Sebastian Bach, using the symbol for common time (4/4). The continuo, playing throughout, is not shown.

Movements of Schmücke dich, o liebe Seele
No.	Title	Text	Type	Vocal	Winds	Strings	Key	Time
1	Schmücke dich, o liebe Seele	Franck	Chorale fantasia	SATB	2Fl 2Ob	2Vl Va	F major	12/8
2	Ermuntre dich, dein Heiland klopft	anon.	Aria	T	Ft		C major	common time
3	Wie teuer sind des heilgen Mahles Gaben! – Ach, wie hungert mein Gemüte	anon., Franck	Recitative and chorale	S		Vp		common time
4	Mein Herz fühlt in sich Furcht und Freude	anon.	Recitative	A	2Fl			common time
5	Lebens Sonne, Licht der Sinnen	anon.	Aria	S	2Fl 2Ob	2Vl Va		common time
6	Herr, laß an mir dein treues Lieben	anon.	Recitative	B				common time
7	Jesu, wahres Brot des Lebens	Franck	Chorale	SATB	2Fl 2Ob	2Vl Va	F major	common time

=== Movements ===
The Eucharistic hymn, with a tune that alternates in an intriguing way between phrases of two and three measures, appears in three movements, the opening chorale fantasia, within a recitative and as the closing four-part chorale. Compared to the early cantata for the same occasion, Ach! ich sehe, itzt, da ich zur Hochzeit gehe, BWV 162, Bach stresses the invitation of God and the joy of the banquet, rather than the possibility of man's failing to respond to the invitation. Alfred Dürr compared the opening chorus and both arias to dances: movement 1 to a gigue, movement 2 to a bourrée, and movement 5 to a polonaise. All movements are set in the major mode. The inner movements are distinguished by their obbligato instruments. The musicologist Julian Mincham noted the work’s "gentle, pastoral quality of great delicacy and refinement, ... charm, grace and a suggestion of fragility”.

==== 1 ====
The opening chorus, "Schmücke dich, du liebe Seele" (Adorn yourself, beloved soul). is an orchestral concerto with the vocal parts embedded, the soprano singing the cantus firmus of the tune by Johann Crüger. The movement shares the “gentle" key of F major with three other works from the cycle of chorale cantatas: the first, O Ewigkeit, du Donnerwort, BWV 20, a French overture on the themes such as eternity and confusion; Herr Christ, der einge Gottessohn, BWV 96, a pastorale composed two weeks earlier; and later the last one, Wie schön leuchtet der Morgenstern, BWV 1, a tone poem using the image of the morning star. The four movements contrast in character, but have in common that they express "an elusive personal connection". John Eliot Gardiner, who conducted the Bach Cantata Pilgrimage in 2000, sees the "relaxed 12/8 processional movement" as "perfectly tailored to the idea of the soul dressing itself up in all its wedding finery". Mincham observed subtle aspects of conveying the message, such as the use of minor mode indicating, the development of the ritornello motif from notes of the first line of the chorale tune, and the significance for not only an individual soul but “for all humanity" by entries of the lower voices in ever-changing sequence.

==== 2 ====
A transverse flute accompanies the tenor voice in the aria "Ermuntre dich: dein Heiland klopft" (Be lively now, your Savior knocks). The knocking is expressed in repeated notes. Throughout the movement, a motif identified by Albert Schweitzer as a joy motif pictures an "almost breathless expression of personal euphoria". The demanding flute part was probably composed for the excellent flute player for whom Bach first wrote a few weeks earlier in Was frag ich nach der Welt, BWV 94, and then in other cantatas during the fall of 1724.

==== 3 ====
A violoncello piccolo complements the soprano in a recitative, which begins as a secco recitative, "Wie teuer sind des heiligen Mahles Gaben" (How dear are the gifts of the holy meal), and leads to the fourth stanza of the chorale, "Ach, wie hungert mein Gemüte" (Ah, how my spirit hungers), sung in a moderately adorned version of the tune. Bach uses recitative to introduce the chorale by evoking the "gift of communion", while the chorale stanza expresses the longing for this gift, mentioning thirst and hunger. The melody sounds sometimes like a new melody, expressing that a personal longing. The violoncello piccolo in continuous motion "envelops the soprano's voice in a quasi womb-like blanketing of divine reassurance", as Mincham phrased it.

==== 4 ====
Two recorders reflect the text of the alto recitative, "Mein Herz fühlt in sich Furcht und Freude" (My heart feels within itself fear and joy). which develops to an arioso, with the recorders first playing just long chords, and then gradually adding motion. Bach expresses joy ("Freude") in an extended melisma on the word.

==== 5 ====
The full orchestra supports the soprano in the second aria, "Lebens Sonne, Licht der Sinnen" (Sun of life, light of the senses). Mincham described the da capo aria as "joyously ebullient". The short middle section of the aria touches minor keys. A melisma on alles (everything) stresses that God means all to the "redeemed sinner".

==== 6 ====
The last recitative, "Herr, laß an mir dein treues Lieben" (Lord, let Your faithful love for me), is secco, but closes as an arioso on the words "und deiner Liebe stets gedenken" (and considers your love constantly). It is a prayer to God to both love the petitioner and evoke a "reciprocal affection."

==== 7 ====
The closing chorale, "Jesu, wahres Brot des Lebens" (Jesus, true bread of life), is set for four parts.

== Recordings ==
The entries for the table are taken from the selection on Bach Cantatas Website. Groups with one voice per part (OVPP) and ensembles playing period instruments in historically informed performance are marked by green background.

Recordings of Schmücke dich, o liebe Seele
Title	Conductor / Choir / Orchestra	Soloists	Label	Year	Choir type	Instr.
Radio Recording - Archiv-Nr: U0-09167	Max Thurn: NDR Knabenchor; Members of NDR Chor; Members of Hamburger Rundfunkorchester	Maria Friesenhausen; Bernhard Michaelis; Hartmut Ochs	NDR	1962		
Les Grandes Cantates de J.S. Bach Vol. 23	Fritz Werner Heinrich-Schütz-Chor Heilbronn Württembergisches Kammerorchester Heilbronn	Hedy Graf; Barbara Scherler; Kurt Huber; Jakob Stämpfli	Erato	1970		
Bach Cantatas Vol. 5 – Sundays after Trinity II	Karl Richter Münchener Bach-Chor Münchener Bach-Orchester	Edith Mathis; Trudeliese Schmidt; Peter Schreier; Dietrich Fischer-Dieskau	Archiv Produktion	1978		
Die Bach Kantate Vol. 54	Helmuth Rilling Gächinger Kantorei Bach-Collegium Stuttgart	Arleen Augér; Carolyn Watkinson; Adalbert Kraus; Walter Heldwein	Hänssler	1979		
J. S. Bach: Das Kantatenwerk • Complete Cantatas • Les Cantates, Folge / Vol. 42 - BWV 180–184	Gustav Leonhardt Knabenchor Hannover Leonhardt-Consort	Soloist of the Knabenchor Hannover; Paul Esswood; Kurt Equiluz; Max van Egmond	Teldec	1988		Period
J. S. Bach: Cantatas with Violoncelle Piccolo (Vol. 1)	Christophe Coin Das Leipziger Concerto Vocale Ensemble Baroque de Limoges	Barbara Schlick; Andreas Scholl; Christoph Prégardien; Gotthold Schwarz	Auvidis Astrée	1993		Period
J. S. Bach: Complete Cantatas Vol. 10	Ton Koopman Amsterdam Baroque Orchestra & Choir	Caroline Stam; Michael Chance; Paul Agnew; Klaus Mertens	Antoine Marchand	1998		Period
Bach Edition Vol. 19 – Cantatas Vol. 10	Pieter Jan Leusink Holland Boys Choir Netherlands Bach Collegium	Ruth Holton; Sytse Buwalda; Knut Schoch; Bas Ramselaar	Brilliant Classics	2000		Period
Bach Cantatas Vol. 11: Genova/Greenwich / For the 20th Sunday after Trinity / For the 21st Sunday after Trinity	John Eliot Gardiner Monteverdi Choir English Baroque Soloists	Magdalena Kožená; Sara Mingardo; Christoph Genz; Peter Harvey	Soli Deo Gloria	2000		Period
J. S. Bach: Cantatas Vol. 26 – Cantatas from Leipzig 1724	Masaaki Suzuki Bach Collegium Japan	Yukari Nonoshita; Timothy Kenworthy-Brown; Makoto Sakurada; Peter Kooy	BIS	2003		Period
J. S. Bach: Cantatas for the Complete Liturgical Year Vol. 1: "Ich will den Kreuzstab gerne tragen" - Cantatas BWV 98 · 180 · 56 · 55	Sigiswald Kuijken La Petite Bande	Sophie Karthäuser; Petra Noskaiová; Christoph Genz; Dominik Wörner	Accent	2004	OVPP	Period
