= List of Army Bureau of Current Affairs publications =

The Army Bureau of Current Affairs (ABCA) as an organisation set up to educate and raise morale amongst British servicemen and servicewomen during World War II.

== ABCA pamphlets and publications ==
The ABCA published two main series of pamphlets War and Current Affairs, both from September 1941 with the former series concluding after Victory in Europe Day in June 1945 and the latter continuing until December 1946. These pamphlets were published biweekly and usually contained 16 pages, including the front and rear covers. There are also seems to have been a French-language version of these pamphlets published for Canadian French speaking troops. A completely different series was made for the Middle East but not many come onto the market.

A further printed publication and different approach for discussion was an ABCA issued wall chart for use in barracks etc., of which not many seem to have survived the war. Last but not least, an ABCA song book was released in 1944 with an introduction by Williams himself.

The details of the War and Current Affair pamphlets are as follows:

=== 1941 WAR ===
- No. 1 : 20 September — News-facts for fighting men
- No. 2 : 4 October — News-facts for fighting men
- No. 3 : 18 October — News-facts for fighting men
- No. 4 : 1 November — News-facts for fighting men
- No. 5 : 15 November — News-facts for fighting men
- No. 6 : 29 November — News-facts for fighting men
- No. 7 : 13 December — News-facts for fighting men
- No. 8 : 27 December — News-facts for fighting men

=== 1942 WAR ===
- No. 9 : 10 January — News-facts for fighting men
- No. 10 : 24 January — News-facts for fighting men
- No. 11 : 7 February — News-facts for fighting men
- No. 12 : 21 February — Fifty-five days in Malaya
- No. 13 : 7 March — If invasion comes
- No. 14 : 21 March — The enemy in the east
- No. 15 : 4 April — The mind of a Nazi
- No. 16 : 18 April — The Libyan See-saw
- No. 17 : 2 May — The German army
- No. 18 : 16 May — How Russia fights
- No. 19 : 30 May — The Greeks fight on
- No. 20 : 13 June — In a desert battle
- No. 21 : 27 June — Libya, summer 1942
- No. 22 : 11 July — The thrust for Egypt
- No. 23 : 25 July — The U.S. Army
- No. 24 : 8 August — Guide for Jap invaders
- No. 25 : 22 August — The Merchant Navy
- No. 26 : 5 September — The Indian Army
- No. 27 : 19 September — Life in the R.A.C.
- No. 28 : 3 October — Dieppe Summary
- No. 29 : 17 October — The British Soldier
- No. 30 : 31 October — I didn't think it mattered
- No. 31 : 14 November — Where did that one go (RA)
- No. 32 : 28 November — The Airborne Forces
- No. 33 : 12 December — Desert song
- No. 34 : 26 December — Army Food (+ CMP + selection)

=== 1943 WAR ===
- No. 35 : 9 January — The trouble with Italians
- No. 36 : 23 January — And what did you see? (RA)
- No. 37 : 6 February — Little men, what now?
- No. 38 : 22 February — This is the Red Army
- No. 39 : 6 March — Battle report (16 p.)
- No. 40 : 20 March — Pass the Ammunition (16 p.)
- No. 41 : 3 April — "Be Mean and kill 'em"
- No. 42 : 17 April — He leads, the others follow
- No. 43 : 1 May — Full Supporting Cast
- No. 44 : 15 May — Casualty report
- No. 45 : 29 May — Operation Diary
- No. 46 : 12 June — The Royal Marines
- No. 47 : 26 June — The horse's mouth
- No. 48 : 10 July — Enemy: Japan
- No. 49 : 24 July — The documents in the case
- No. 50 : 7 August — Mediterranean Journey
- No. 51 : 21 August — The guards at Mareth
- No. 52 : 4 September — A night out in Sicily
- No. 53 : 18 September — ATS (progress report)
- No. 54 : 2 October — Daylight bombing
- No. 55 : 16 October — Coastal Forces
- No. 56 : 30 October — Soldiers' Battles
- No. 57 : 13 November — All orders faithfully executed (RE)
- No. 58 : 27 November — When in Rome
- No. 59 : 11 December — Parachuting as a career
- No. 60 : 25 December — Thought for food (and part two of Parachuting as a career.)

=== 1944 WAR ===
- No. 61 : 8 January — Seaward watch
- No. 62 : 22 January — Frankfurt revisited
- No. 63 : 5 February — Recce Corps
- No. 64 : 19 February — Strictly G.I.
- No. 65 : 4 March — Salerno Diary
- No. 66 : 18 March — Louder and Faster (AA)
- No. 67 : 1 April — The man overhead
- No. 68 : 15 April — Self-preservation (booby traps)
- No. 69 : 29 April — One more river
- No. 70 : 13 May — The other army
- No. 71 : 27 May — Next of kin
- No. 72 : 10 June — Up in Arms
- No. 73 : 24 June — Preparations (16 p.)
- No. 74 : 8 July — D-Day
- No. 75 : 5 August — The case against Private Abbott
- No. 76 : 19 August — Tiger, tiger, burning bright
- No. 77 : 2 September — Two sides of battle
- No. 78 : 16 September — The Captain in search of his youth
- No. 79 : 14 October — Not only concerned with food
- No. 80 : 28 October — Gentlemen, let us not hurry
- No. 81 : 11 November — Five years of war
- No. 82 : 25 November — Yes, if he has no fingernails
- No. 83 : 9 December — Arnhem, part I
- No. 84 : 23 December — Arnhem, part II

=== 1945 WAR ===
- No. 85 : 6 January — Look Homeward, Jap
- No. 86 : 20 January — Antwerp
- No. 88 : 17 February — Riding high
- No. 89 : 3 March — The Philippines
- No. 90 : 17 March — The Red Army advances
- No. 91 : 31 March — Incidental explosion
- No. 93 : 28 April — Report (20 p.)
- No. 94 : 12 May — Return via Dunkirk
- No. 95 : 26 May — From now on (16 p.)
- No. 96 : 9 June — The road to Rangoon
- No. 97 : 23 June — Swan song

== A.B.C.A. series CURRENT AFFAIRS ==
=== 1941 Current Affairs ===
- No. 1 : 27 September — A background bulletin
- No. 2 : 11 October — A background bulletin
- No. 3 : 25 October — A background bulletin
- No. 4 : 8 November — A background bulletin
- No. 5 : 22 November — A background bulletin
- No. 6 : 6 December — A background bulletin
- No. 7 : 20 December — A background bulletin

=== 1942 ===
- No. 8 : 3 January — A background bulletin
- No. 9 : 17 January — A background bulletin
- No. 10 : 31 January — A background bulletin
- No. 11 : 14 February — A background bulletin
- No. 12 : 28 February — A background bulletin
- No. 13 : 14 March — A background bulletin
- No. 14 : 28 March — A background bulletin
- No. 15 : 11 April — A background bulletin
- No. 16 : 25 April — A background bulletin
- No. 17 : 9 May — South Africa and the War
- No. 18 : 23 May — Britain's Acres go to War
- No. 19 : 6 June — Cripps on India
- No. 20 : 20 June — Women at War
- No. 21 : 4 July — Hitler's Own War
- No. 22 : 18 July — Meet the Americans
- No. 23 : 1 August — The British Empire
- No. 24 : 15 August — The Chungking Angle
- No. 25 : 29 August — The Russian Background
- No. 26 : 12 September — Here are the Americans
- No. 27 : 26 September — Town Planning
- No. 28 : 10 October — What price Victory?
- No. 29 : 24 October — Development of Nazism
- No. 30 : 7 November — How can we abolish War?
- No. 31 : 21 November — Taking Stock
- No. 32 : 5 December — North Africa
- No. 33 : 19 December — The Beveridge report

=== 1943 ===
- No. 34 : 2 January — The Mediterranean
- No. 35 : 16 January — Rumour
- No. 36 : 30 January — North African Resources
- No. 37 : 13 February — The Nation's health
- No. 38 : 27 February — The Middle East and Turkey
- No. 39 : 13 March — Spain
- No. 40 : 27 March — Latin America
- No. 41 : 10 April — Germany's New Order
- No. 42 : 24 April — The Colonies
- No. 43 : 8 May — Problems in the Pacific
- No. 44 : 22 May — Women after the war
- No. 45 : 5 June — Social Security
- No. 46 : 3 July — Facts about Italy
- No. 47 : 17 July — Balkan Background
- No. 48 : 31 July — When the Lights go on
- No. 49 : 14 August — The trouble with Germans
- No. 50 : 28 August — You are going to Europe
- No. 51 : 11 September — What about our schools?
- No. 52 : 25 September — Transatlantic Soundings
- No. 53 : 9 October — Here's Tae Us!
- No. 54 : 23 October — What we'll Find in Europe
- No. 55 : 6 November — Are we United Nations
- No. 56 : 20 November — Building the Post-war Home
- No. 57 : 4 December — Farming in Soviet Russia
- No. 58 : 18 December — What about France?

=== 1944 Current Affairs ===
- No. 59 : 1 January — You and the Americans
- No. 60 : 15 January — Armies of Occupation
- No. 61 : 29 January - Woman's Place
- No. 62 : 12 February — What we'll Find in Germany
- No. 63 : 26 February — This Business of Public Opinion
- No. 64 : 11 March — The Yank in Britain
- No. 65 : 25 March — What is good food
- No. 66 : 8 April — Belgium and Holland
- No. 67 : 22 April — How about Japan
- No. 68 : 6 May — Partners in Battle
- No. 69 : 20 May — The Nazis in Scandinavia
- No. 70 : 3 June — Electing the President
- No. 71 : 17 June — Work for All
- No. 72 : 1 July — So you're going to France
- No. 73 : 15 July — Partisan Setting!
- No. 74 : 29 July — Friends in Need
- No. 75 : 12 August — After the Blitz is Over?
- No. 76 : 26 August — Schools for Tomorrow
- No. 77 : 9 September — The Japanese Way
- No. 78 : 23 September — "Show me the way to go home"
- No. 79 : 7 October — Brush-up for civvy street
- No. 80 : 21 October — Parisian come-back
- No. 81 : 4 November — A Weapon against want
- No. 82 : 18 November — What happened at home? (20p.)
- No. 83 : 2 December — Fewer children
- No. 84 : 16 December — Men from the Dominions
- No. 85 : 30 December — The cinema and the public

=== 1945 Current Affairs ===
- No. 86 : 13 January — Japanese purpose
- No. 87 : 27 January — What price Peace?
- No. 88 : 10 February — Chinese prospect
- No. 89 : 24 February — A practical democracy (on New Zealand) (20 p.)
- No. 90 : 10 March — The more we are together
- No. 91 : 24 March — 'Jolly Swagman'
- No. 92 : no details
- No. 93 : 21 April — Theirs is the Future
- No. 94 : 5 May — On thinking geographically
- No. 95 : no details
- No. 96 : 2 June — The artist and the public (20 p.)
- No. 98 : 30 June - The "Cost" of the War (20 p.)
- No. B1 : 21 July — Bridging the Gap
- No. B2 : 4 August — A matter of choice (16 p.)
- No. 3(B) : 18 August — This business of migration (20 p.)
- No. 4(B) : 1 September — The prospect before us (16 p.)
- No. 5(B) : 15 September — We all go the same way home (16 p.)
- No. 7(B) : 13 October — Look before you leap! (30 p.)
- No. 108(A) : 17 November — South African Survey
- No. 10(B) : 24 November — Hungry World
- No. 109(A) : 1 December — Indian Background (20 p.)
- No. 110(A) : 15 December — Housing Brief (20 p.)
- No. 12(B) : 22 December — Work in hand (20 p.)
- No. 112 : 12 January — Burning Issue (20 p.)
- No. 117 : no date — "What Manchester thinks to-day..." (20 p.)

Note: Between July and December 1945 ABCA 'Current Affairs' had a 'B'-series in between the normal bi-weekly issue, with a B prefix for the book number.
