= Du, o schönes Weltgebäude =

Lutheran hymn

- Lutheran hymn
- Catalogue: Zahn 6773
- Text: by Johann Franck
- Language: German
- Melody: by Johann Crüger
- Published: 1649

"Du, o schönes Weltgebäude" (You, O beautiful building of the world) is a Lutheran hymn in German, with text by Johann Franck and melody by Johann Crüger. It was first published in Crüger's 1649 Geistliche Kirchen-Melodien, and was later adopted in other hymnals, such as the 1653 edition of his Praxis pietatis melica. The topic is renouncing the world, hoping to be united with Jesus. While the hymn is no longer in practical use, one stanza, "Komm, o Tod, du Schlafes Bruder" (Come, O death, to sleep a brother), was prominently used in Bach's solo cantata Ich will den Kreuzstab gerne tragen, BWV 56; in English, it is commonly referred to as the "Kreuzstab cantata".

== History ==
The text, a reflection on the tribulations when facing death, was written by Johann Franck in eight stanzas. With a melody by Johann Crüger, the song appeared first in Crüger's hymnal Geistliche Kirchen-Melodien (Sacred church melodies) of 1649, with the incipit "Du geballtes Weltgebäude". It was included in his Praxis pietatis melica in the 1653 edition. A 1864 anthology of sacred poetry from Martin Luther to Friedrich Gottlieb Klopstock contains seven stanzas. The hymn is no longer used.

== Text ==
The text opens with a stanza condemning and renouncing worldly pleasures, longing instead to be united with Jesus. (Note: Der Freuden dieser Welt bedeuten für den Dichter, der nach dem Jenseits sehnt, nichts. Die folgenden Strophen variieren diesen Gedanken unablässig. Dabei ruft der belesene Dichter auch die Bilderwelt antiker Dichtung zur Hilfe, wie man schon in der [dritten] Strophe bemerkt.../ The joys of this world mean nothing to the poet, who only yearns for the hereafter. The subsequent verses continue with variations on the same theme. In addition, in the [third] stanza, the erudite poet evokes the poetic imagery of classical antiquity...) Jesus is repeatedly addressed in the refrain of each final stanza, referring to Him as "Jesulein" (Little Jesus), with attributes such as "allerschönstes" (most beautiful) or "allerliebstes" (most beloved). More modern editions change the text, so that for example the last line of the first stanza becomes "lieber Herr und Heiland mein" (My dear Lord and Saviour). The first and the third stanzas of the English translation by Catherine Winkworth read:

Du, o schönes Weltgebäude,
magst gefallen, wem du willt;
deine scheinbarliche Freude
ist mit lauter Angst umhüllt.
Denen, die den Himmel hassen,
will ich ihre Weltlust lassen;
mich verlangt nach dir allein,
allerschönstes Jesulein!

Andre mögen durch die Wellen
und durch Wind und Klippen gehn,
ihren Handel zu bestellen,
und da Sturm und Not bestehn;
ich will auf des Glaubens Schwingen
aufwärts in den Himmel dringen,
ewig da bei dir zu sein,
allerliebstes Jesulein!

Translation:

Let who will in thee rejoice,
O thou fair and wondrous earth!
Ever anguished sorrow's voice
Pierces through thy seeming mirth;
Let thy vain delights be given
Unto them who love not Heaven,
My desire is fixed on Thee,
Jesus, dearest far to me!

Others dare the treacherous wave,
Hidden rock and shifting wind—
Storm and danger let them brave,
Earthly good or wealth to find;
Faith shall wing my upward flight
Far above yon starry height,
Till I find myself with Thee,
Jesus, dearest Friend to me!

According to the classical philologist Egert Pöhlmann, Franck's knowledge of classics was of help for the poetic imagery of the third stanza; here Pöhlmann finds echos of the profane ancient Greek and Latin poetry of Sappho and Horace. (Note: The priamel of Sappho's Fragment 16 translates as: Some say a cavalry corps, some infantry, some, again, will maintain that the swift oars of our fleet are the finest sight on dark earth; but I say that whatever one loves, is.) (Note: Verses 35–36 of Book I of Horace's Odes read: quod si lyricis vatibis inseres, sublimi feriam sidera vertice / but if you give me a place among the lyric poets, I shall rise up till my head strikes the stars)

A literal English translation of sixth stanza starts "Come, O death, you brother of sleep" – a century earlier in a paraphrase of the Nunc dimittis, Martin Luther wrote the hymn "Mit Fried und Freud ich fahr dahin" containing the verse "Der Tod ist mein Schlaf worden" (Death has become my sleep). For Franck's sixth stanza and the closing chorale of Bach's "Kreuzstab cantata", Death is addressed as a brother of sleep and asked to end the voyage of life by loosening the rudder of the pilgrim's boat or 'little ship' (Schifflein) and bringing it safely to harbour; it marks the end of the cantata's metaphorical journey. A metrical translation into English was provided by Henry Drinker. (Note: The first four lines of Drinker's translation read: Come, O death, end my voyage, make my journey smooth and short, furl my sails and drop my anchor, bring me safely into port.) The current translation is a minor variant:

Komm, o Tod, du Schlafes Bruder,
Komm und führe mich nur fort;
Löse meines Schiffleins Ruder,
Bringe mich an sichern Port!
Es mag, wer da will, dich scheuen,
Du kannst mich vielmehr erfreuen;
Denn durch dich komm ich herein
Zu dem schönsten Jesulein.

Translation:

Come, O death, to sleep a brother,
Come and make the voyage short,
Loose my little vessel's rudder,
Bring me safely into port.
Others shun and dread to meet thee,
I with eager joy will greet thee.
'Tis through death that I may be
Ever, Jesus mine, with thee.

Classical references to Death as the brother of Sleep, or as twins, go back to the Greek and Latin epics – the Iliad and the Aeneid – and the poetry of Hesiod, Virgil, Seneca and Valerius Flaccus; the metaphor of life as a journey dates back to classical times, and has been revisited in the Medieval, Renaissance, Baroque era and beyond; finally Franck's "sichern Port" echos Virgil's phrase beati portus from his early Catalepton.

In the seventh stanza, Franck calls the body, "the prison of the soul", an image that Pöhlmann remarks can be dated back to the Orpheus myth in Plato's Cratylus and Philolaos.

== Melody and musical settings ==
The melody by Johann Crüger, Zahn No. 6773, is in bar form.

External audio
- Bach's closing chorale for BWV 56, Heinrich-Schütz-Chor Heilbronn, Pforzheim Chamber Orchestra, dir. Fritz Werner

Other hymns sung to the same melody include Paul Gerhardt's "Jesu, liebster Bruder", which addresses the "dearest Brother" as anchor and rudder ("Anker" and "Ruder"). It was printed by Zimmermann in 1821.

Johann Sebastian Bach composed a four-part chorale setting, BWV 301. He used the sixth stanza, "Komm, o Tod, du Schlafes Bruder" (Come, o Death, brother of sleep), for the closing chorale of his solo cantata for bass, Ich will den Kreuzstab gerne tragen, BWV 56. (Note: The four-part harmonization of "Du, o schönes Weltgebäude" is No. 87 of Bach's 371 Harmonized Chorales, edited by Carl Ferdinand Becker and published by Breitkopf & Härtel in 1831.)

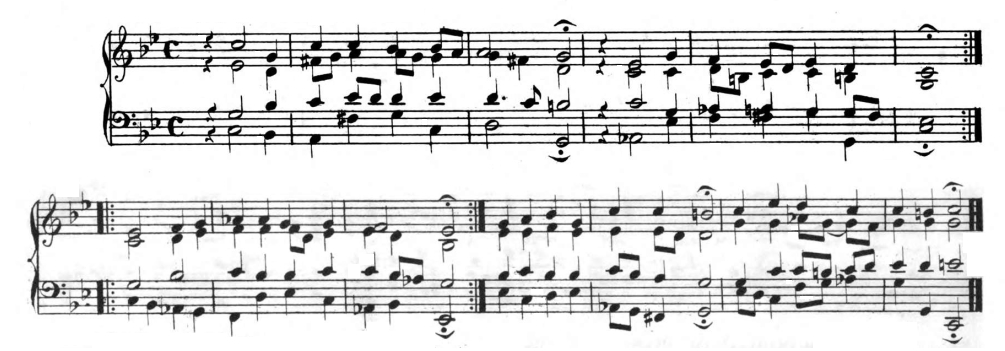

Further settings of "Du, o schönes Weltgebäude" include a cantata by Georg Telemann, TWV 1:394 and an instrumental chorale by Christoph Graupner GWV 1002:39. In addition there are settings for organ and obbligato instrument by Georg Friedrich Kauffmann in the collection Harmonische Seelenlust and by Gottfried August Homilius in the collection HoWV.X. There is further short organ chorale prelude composed by Dame Ethel Smythe in 1884 and published in 1913, as well as a setting by contemporary German composer Axel Ruoff, the latter recorded on a Toccata Classics CD.
