= The British Way and Purpose =

British Army educational programme

First edition

The British Way and Purpose was an educational programme set up by the British Directorate of Army Education within the British Army in the autumn of 1942. The series of accompanying pamphlets were subsequently collated into an eponymous book published in 1944. The educationalist Robert L. Marshall was the general editor of the series. The booklets were also used by the Royal Navy and the Royal Air Force.

There were a variety of contributors including Denis Brogan on the United States, Barbara Ward on citizenship and Hilary Marquand on people at work.

== See also ==
- Army Bureau of Current Affairs
