= Johann Franck =

German poet and hymnist (1618–1677)

Johann Fran(c)k (1 June 1618 – 18 June 1677) was a German politician (serving as mayor of Guben and a member of the Landtag of Lower Lusatia) and a lyric poet and hymnist.

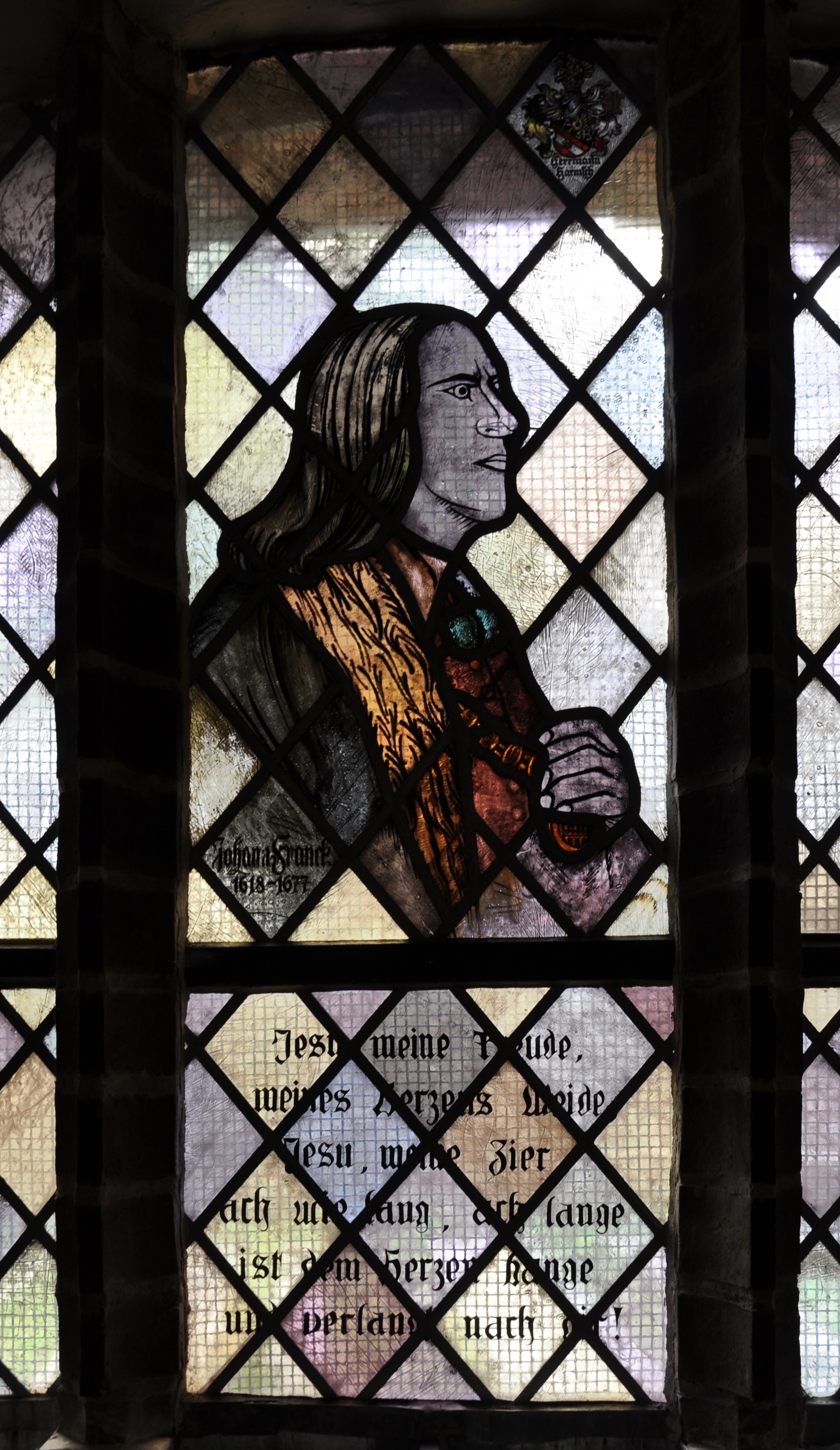
Artistic representation of Franck on a window at the Paul-Gerhardt-Kirche in Lübben.

== Life ==
Franck was born in Guben, Margraviate of Lower Lusatia. After visiting the Latin school in Guben, he attended schools in Cottbus and Stettin, as well as the gymnasium in Thorn (Toruń). After studying law at the University of Königsberg, he became a councilor in his native town, later becoming its mayor and a member of the Landtag of Lower Lusatia. He died in Guben.

== Works ==
Under the influence of the Silesian School and of Simon Dach of Königsberg, he produced a series of poems and hymns, collected and edited by himself in two volumes (Guben, 1674), entitled: Teutsche Gedichte, enthaltend geistliches Zion samt Vaterunserharfe nebst irdischem Helicon oder Lob-, Lieb-, Leidgedichte, etc.. His secular poems are forgotten; about forty of his religious songs, hymns, and psalms have been kept in the hymnals of the German Protestant Church. Some of these are the hymn for Communion "Schmücke dich, o liebe Seele" ("Deck thyself, my soul, with gladness"), the Advent hymn Komm, Heidenheiland, Lösegeld (Come, Ransom of our captive race, a translation into German of Veni redemptor gentium), and a hymn to Jesus, "Jesu, meine Freude" ('Jesus, My Joy'), which is best known as being the basis of Bach's funeral motet Jesu, meine Freude, BWV 227. His hymn "Du, o schönes Weltgebäude" (You, o beautiful building of the world), with a melody by Crüger is no longer in practical use, but one stanza, "Komm, o Tod, du Schlafes Bruder" (Come, O death, to sleep a brother), was prominently used in Bach's solo cantata Ich will den Kreuzstab gerne tragen, BWV 56.

The music for his hymns by the Guben organist Christoph Peter appeared first in the Andachtscymbeln, the oldest Guben hymn book, in 1648. In honor of Franck, a simple monument has been erected at the south wall of the Guben parish church.
