= Robert L. Marshall =

Scottish educationalist (1913–2008)

Robert Leckie Marshall (27 August 1913 – 21 October 2008) was a Scottish educationalist who was principal of the Co-operative College.

Marshall was born into a miner's family in Lanarkshire and attended primary school at Chryston. He went on to Coatbridge secondary school. Thanks to a Carnegie Foundation grant, a miners' scholarship and a university bursary, he was able to attend St Andrews University whence he graduated in 1935 with two degrees – medieval and modern history, and first-class honours in English. He was active in college life, editing the university magazine, captaining the soccer team and acting as union president. He then gained a Harkness Fellowship which funded a two-year stay at Yale University where he gained an MA in politics. On his return to Scotland he worked for the Scottish Office until 1939 when he volunteered for the Army. He was commissioned into the Royal Army Service Corps and served in France before being evacuated from Dunkirk.

After a spell in hospital and with his general fitness reduced, he joined the Royal Army Education Corps. He was appointed chief instructor at the army school of Wakefield. However, he was subsequently posted to the War Office, where he was responsible for editing a series of booklets known as The British Way and Purpose (BWP). He was appointed commandant of the school of education with the rank of lieutenant-colonel before leaving the army in 1946. He received an OBE for services to army education.
