= Taille (instrument) =

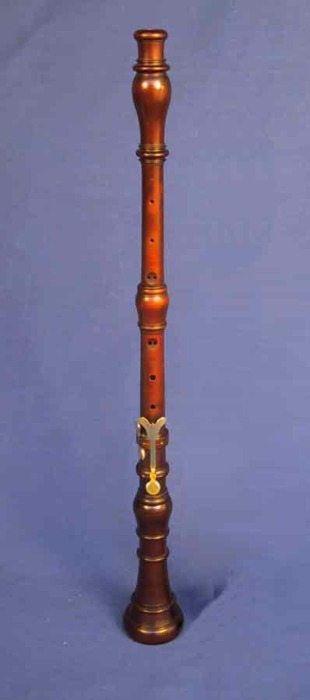
A model of the classical taille

The taille, also called the taille de hautbois or the alto oboe, was a Baroque alto oboe pitched in F. It had a straight body, an open bell, and two keys.

The instrument was first used in Alcidiane by Jean-Baptiste Lully in 1658 and in French ensembles known as the bandes de hautbois, in which it played the inner lines of polyphonic compositions. J.S. Bach employed it when a low-pitched oboe sound was needed to double the viola parts in several of his cantatas, but almost exclusively in movements of a jubilant or otherwise loud nature due to its having had a more piercing sound than that of the cor anglais.

Today, the instrument is rare outside period ensembles, and a cor anglais is commonly substituted. However, the period-instrument movement has seen a revival of the taille, with a number of makers now producing reproductions of classic examples.

The term was also later applied to any instrument that played the tenor part in an orchestra, e.g. the tenor viol or viola.
