= Jonathan Freeman-Attwood =

British academic

Jonathan Freeman-Attwood, CBE is the 14th principal of the Royal Academy of Music in London; he was appointed in 2008. Alongside his commitment to education, he is a writer, record producer, broadcaster and solo trumpet player.

In 2001, he was conferred as professor with a personal chair from the University of London, and in 2009 was appointed a Fellow of King's College London, (where he is a visiting professor); he was a trustee of the University of London from 2010 to 2015, appointed fellow of the Royal Northern College of Music in 2013, and in 2017 was made a fellow of the Royal College of Music. He is a trustee and chair of the artistic advisory committee of Garsington Opera, the Associated Board of the Royal Schools of Music (ABRSM) and the Countess of Munster Musical Trust. He was a trustee of the Young Classical Artists Trust (YCAT) between 2009 and 2018. He is a council member of the advisory board of the Academy of Ancient Music, vice-president of the National Youth Wind Orchestra of Great Britain, Founding Patron of London Youth Choirs, a trustee of Christ Church Cathedral Oxford Music and the British Library Saga Trust. He is also the Patron of the Imogen Cooper Music Trust. In 2018 he was granted the title of honorary visiting professor of Tokyo University of the Arts (Tokyo Geidai). In 2025, he was conferred an Honorary Member of Christ Church, Oxford.

He was appointed a CBE (Commander of the Most Excellent Order of the British Empire) on 30 December 2017 for Services to Music.

== Early life and education ==
Freeman-Attwood was born in Woking, Surrey, on 4 November 1961, the son of Major Harold Warren Freeman-Attwood and Marigold Diana Sneyd Freeman-Attwood (née Philips).

He attended first St Peter's School, Seaford, and from 1975 to 1980 Milton Abbey School. He obtained a BMus in music at the University of Toronto and then a Master of Philosophy at Christ Church, Oxford.

== Career ==
He served as vice-principal and director of studies at the Royal Academy of Music from 1995 to 2008 under his predecessor, Sir Curtis Price. This followed a period as dean of undergraduate studies between 1991 and 1995, when he was responsible for launching the first Bachelor of Music performance degree in the sector, with King's College London, and under the aegis of the Centre for Advanced Performance Studies (CAPS).

Holding senior posts at the academy for over 30 years, Freeman-Attwood assisted in developing new programmes, major international relationships – nurturing a twenty-year collaboration with the academy's sister conservatoire in the US, The Juilliard School – including three Promenade concerts, commercial recordings and a co-commission of Sir Peter Maxwell's Kommilitonen!. Among his other professional development initiatives is the founding in 1997 of the academy recording label (now with more than fifty titles, all of which he produced, including a major association with Linn Records from 2012).

In celebration of the Bicentenary, Freeman-Attwood commissioned the academy's 200 PIECES series which launched in December 2022. 200 composers, including Brett Dean, Helen Grime, Eleanor Alberga, Sir George Benjamin, and Hans Abrahamsen, were invited to write 200 new works for solo instruments or voice, with all 34 principal-study instruments being represented.

During Freeman-Attwood's principalship, the academy has received Taught Degree-Awarding Powers from the Privy Council, has appointed a roster of eminent conductors, instrumentalists and singers to join each department and make regular annual visits. They include Semyon Bychkov, Barbara Hannigan, Sir Mark Elder, Edward Gardner, James Ehnes, Leif Ove Andsnes and John Wilson. He has also led the academy's largest fundraising campaign in its history, with over a £100 million since 2013 of which £75 million has been raised as part of the academy's Bicentenary Campaign. He has also overseen several transformational estate developments, including the building of the RIBA award-winning Susie Sainsbury Theatre and the Angel Burgess Recital Hall, as well as a practice facility and a suite of new studios.

== Personal ==
In 1990, Freeman-Attwood married Henrietta Paula Christian Parham; they have two children.

== Recordings ==
Jonathan Freeman-Attwood has produced over 250 commercial discs for many international artists and ensembles.

As a trumpet soloist, Freeman-Attwood has released thirteen solo albums, the majority with Linn Records.

Freeman-Attwood has published over 100 arrangements, including all the material from his commercial recordings. In 2020, he collaborated with Paris-based composer Thomas Oehler in a reimagining of a trumpet sonata after Richard Strauss for Boosey & Hawkes. In 2024, he released 'Handel for Trumpet', a disc of reconditioned sonatas, concertos, suites and arias.

In 2014 he recorded the Godfather Theme for Sony as part of the anniversary celebrations of the classic films. This follows an edition of Stravinsky's Pulcinella Suite with collaborator Daniel-Ben Pienaar.

In 2021 he released a recording of four Classical-style sonatas 'by' and 'after' Mozart, created by Mozart scholar Professor Timothy Jones, drawing on varied styles and periods in Mozart's music as well as torsos and sketches.

In 2025, he released a recording of his own edition of the Bach Cello Suites on Deux-Elles, and a score published by Faber in their Edition Peters series.

== Writing and broadcasting ==
He discussed his career and views on the changing world of music education at length in an interview with Final Note Magazine in 2015 and in January 2023 he wrote for The Arts Desk, advocating for conservatoires prioritising making recordings.

In 2021 he co-edited a volume, Musical Architects, to celebrate the new spaces designed by Ian Ritchie Architects at the Royal Academy of Music, and also the academy's bicentenary in 2022.

In 2023 the volume Musically Speaking has been published, a collection of interviews with significant musical figures. Conducted between 2009 and 2018, Freeman-Attwood's 'Principal's Interviews' include extended exchanges with, amongst others, Dame Janet Baker, Sir Colin Davis, Semyon Bychkov, Christoph von Dohnányi and Oliver Knussen. The volume will also feature an extended essay on the symphonies of Anton Bruckner, based on an interview with Christian Thielemann after his recently completed recordings with the Vienna Philharmonic Orchestra for Sony Music.

Freeman-Attwood has also written and established authority on Bach interpretation for several journals^{[36]}, including over 30 years of reviewing mainly Baroque music for Gramophone. He has also contributed to publications on recordings for Cambridge University Press.

As a broadcaster, Freeman-Attwood has contributed for many years to BBC Radio 3's records, building a library, especially in works by Bach, Mozart and Bruckner.
