= Army Bureau of Current Affairs =

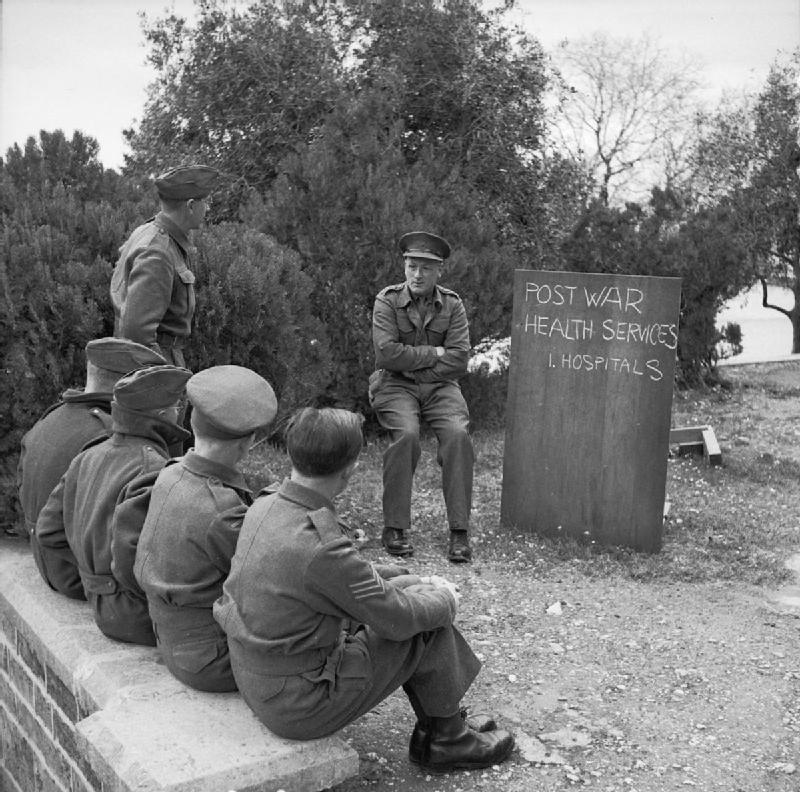
A medical officer giving a lecture on plans for a post-war health service during an Army Bureau of Current Affairs course at the American University of Beirut

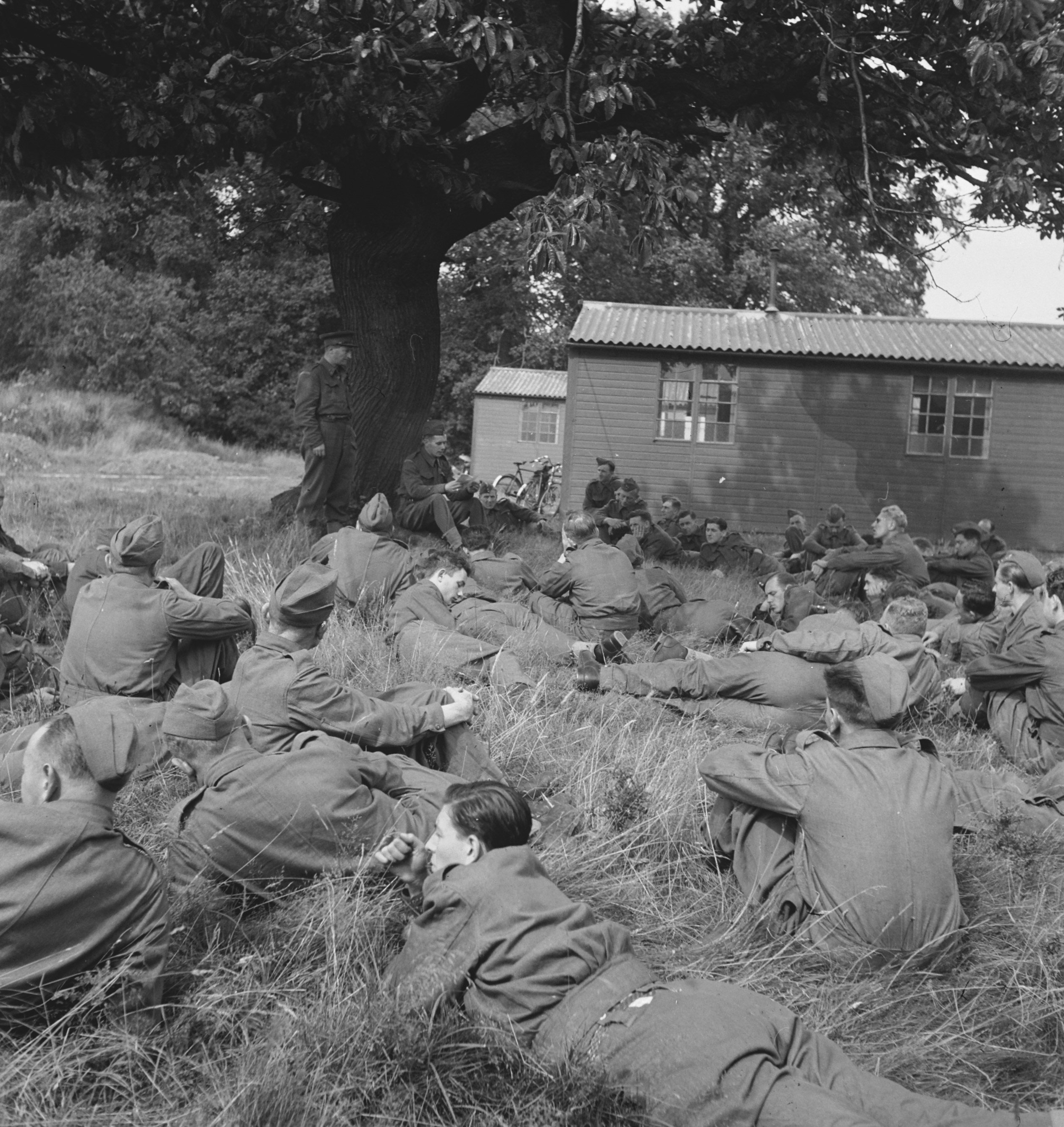
Dutch soldiers of the Princess Irene Brigade participate in an ABCA-moderated discussion in August 1943

The Army Bureau of Current Affairs (ABCA) was an organisation within the British Army during World War II to promote discussion among soldiers about current events, citizenship, and post-war reconstruction.

In August 1940, Lord Croft, Under-Secretary of State for War, had sought the advice of Dr Tom Jones – renowned for his commitment to adult education – about supplying "mental stimulant" to troops. Jones had immediately recommended his protégé William Emrys Williams, who was thus appointed director of the new unit. Both the ABCA and the Directorate of Army Education (run by Lt Col Frederic William Duffield Bendall) came under the Director-General of Welfare and Education.

Williams insisted – despite some controversy – on the right to education, in particular in current affairs, for servicemen and women, and ran the ABCA for the duration of the war. For this role, he became known as "ABCA Bill". The ABCA issued pamphlets in units and promoted discussions, for instance about post-war reconstruction and the Beveridge report. It met with resistance from Winston Churchill, who felt it was a poor use of military time.

The organisation is sometimes regarded as a factor in the landslide Labour Party victory in the post-war general election in 1945, a charge that was refuted by General Ronald Adam, the Adjutant General, who had overall responsibility for the Bureau. Nonetheless, ABCA organisers and teachers predominantly seem to have been left-wing, as were the soldiers who attended the classes, and classes became dominated by discussion of nationalisation and social justice. The service vote in the election that followed is said to have been the most dramatic reflection of the public mood, with as many as 80% of soldiers voting for the Labour Party according to some sources.

After the war and under the auspices of the Carnegie Trust, Williams transformed the ABCA into the Bureau of Current Affairs, moving their offices to Piccadilly in London and continued their activities in peacetime with the assistance of several ABCA contributors including the artists James Boswell.

== See also ==
- The British Way and Purpose (1944)
- Army Educational Corps (AEC)
