= Widerstehe doch der Sünde, BWV 54 =

Church cantata by Johann Sebastian Bach

Widerstehe doch der Sünde
- BWV 54
- Solo church cantata by J. S. Bach
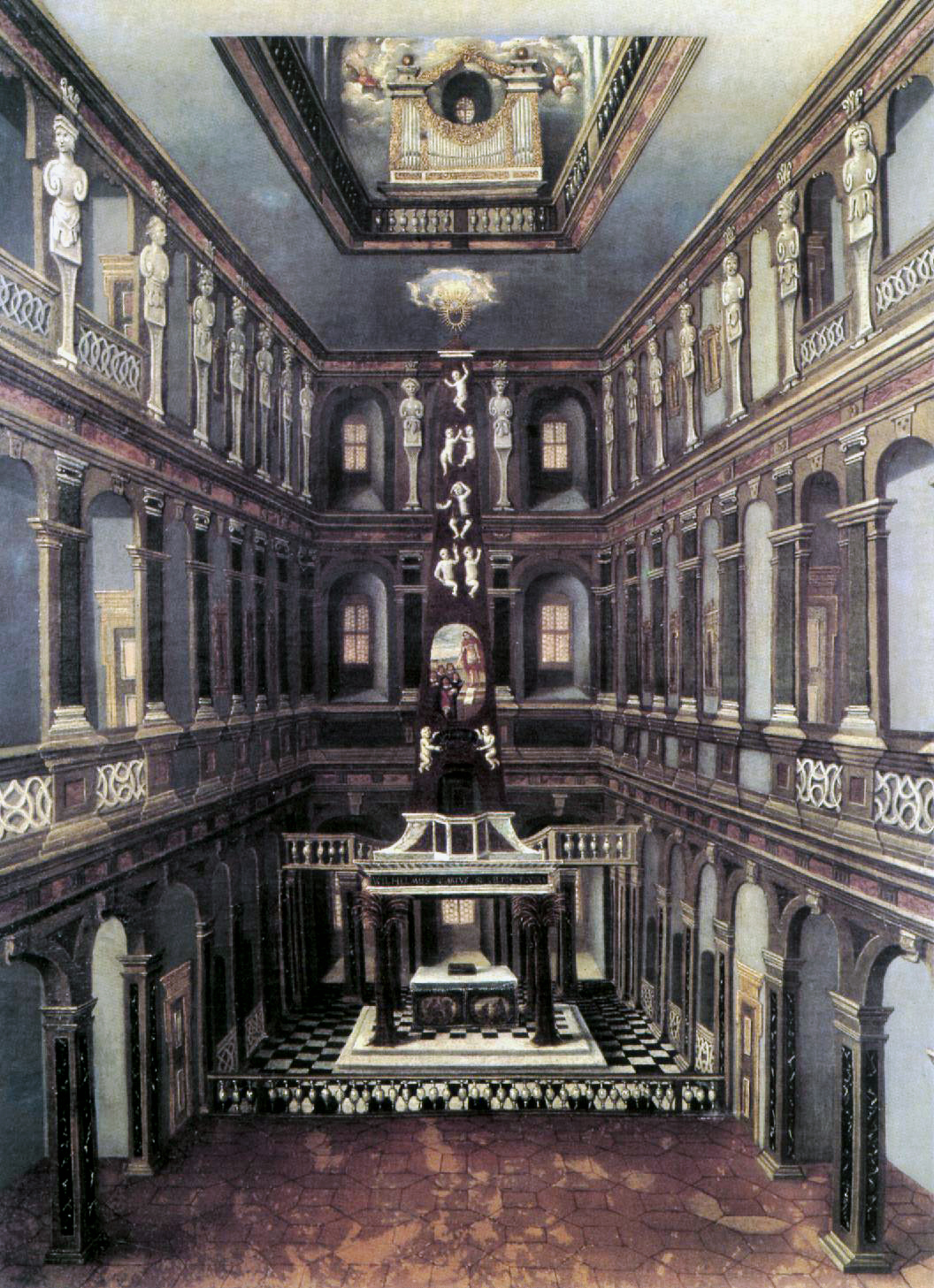
- Schlosskirche in Weimar
- Occasion: Oculi; Seventh Sunday after Trinity
- Text: German
- Cantata text: Georg Christian Lehms
- Performed: 15 July 1714?: Weimar
- Movements: 3
- Vocal: solo alto
- Instrumental: 2 violins; 2 violas; continuo

Widerstehe doch der Sünde (Just resist sin), BWV 54, (Note: "BWV" is Bach-Werke-Verzeichnis, a thematic catalogue of Bach's works.) is a church cantata by Johann Sebastian Bach. He composed the solo cantata for alto in Weimar between 1711 and 1714, and probably performed it on the seventh Sunday after Trinity, 15 July 1714. It is Bach's first extant church cantata for a solo voice.

The text of the short work was written by Georg Christian Lehms, for two arias and a connecting recitative. The topic is to resist sin, based on the Epistle of James. The text was published in a 1711 collection, dedicated to the Sunday Oculi. It is not known when Bach composed the work but is assumed that he performed it as part of his monthly cantata productions in 1714 on the seventh Sunday after Trinity, 15 July. The solo voice is accompanied by strings: two violin parts, two viola parts and continuo. The composition begins with a striking dissonant chord.

== History and words ==
The history of the composition is not clear. The text was written by Georg Christian Lehms for Oculi, the third Sunday in Lent, and published in 1711 in Gottgefälliges Kirchen-Opffer. It concentrates on avoiding sin, based on the Epistle of James. The first line of movement 3 quotes 1 John 3:8. Bach may have composed the cantata already before taking up regular cantata compositions in Weimar. He was appointed concertmaster of the Weimar court capelle of the co-reigning dukes Wilhelm Ernst and Ernst August of Saxe-Weimar, on 2 March 1714. As concertmaster, he assumed the principal responsibility for composing new works, specifically cantatas for the Schlosskirche (palace church), on a monthly schedule.

The Bach scholar Alfred Dürr suggested that Bach performed the cantata for the Seventh Sunday after Trinity of 1714. The prescribed readings for the Sunday are from the Epistle to the Romans, "the wages of sin is death; but the gift of God is eternal life" (Romans 6:19–23), and from the Gospel of Mark, the feeding of the 4000 (Mark 8:1–9). The cantata text relates to the epistle of both Sundays, but shows no connection to either Gospel.

While Dürr assumes that Bach first performed the cantata on 15 July 1714, other scholars arrive at different dates. John Eliot Gardiner and others assume Oculi that year which would make it the earliest cantata performed after the promotion. It is his first extant church cantata for a solo voice, followed by Mein Herze schwimmt im Blut, BWV 199, for soprano. The cantata is the first of four written for a single alto soloist, the others, all composed in 1726, being Geist und Seele wird verwirret, BWV 35, Vergnügte Ruh, beliebte Seelenlust, BWV 170, and Gott soll allein mein Herze haben, BWV 169, two of which also have texts by Lehms.

It is not clear what sort of alto singer (boy contralto? adult male falsettist? high tenor?) might have been the intended or actual first performer of "Widerstehe doch der Sünde", especially given its low range and tessitura compared with other alto solo writing by Bach such as Geist und Seele wird verwirret, BWV 35 or Vergnügte Ruh, beliebte Seelenlust, BWV 170. If the cantata was written early in Bach's (second) Weimar period, then perhaps the soloist could have been Adam Immanuel Weldig, the only falsettist in the Weimar court chapel in 1708 (the other five singers being a bass, two tenors and two teenage discantists). However, Weldig's designation as "falsettist" may indicate that he was a soprano and not an alto. Weldig left Weimar in 1713 so could not have sung if the first performance was as late as 1714 as suggested by Dürr.

== Scoring and structure ==
The cantata, structured in three movements, is scored as chamber music for a solo alto voice, two violins (Vl), two violas (Va), and basso continuo (Bc). The duration is given as 14 minutes. The manuscript title page reads: "Cantata.à 2 Violini, 2 Viole, Alto, Solo, è Cont.: del J.S.B.".

In the following table of the movements, the scoring follows the Neue Bach-Ausgabe. The keys and time signatures are taken from Alfred Dürr, using the symbols for common time (4/4) and alla breve (2/2). The continuo, playing throughout, is not shown.

Movements of Widerstehe doch der Sünde
No.	Title	Text	Type	Vocal	Strings	Key	Time
1	Widerstehe doch der Sünde	Lehms	Aria	A	2Vl 2Va	E-flat major	common time
2	Die Art verruchter Sünden	Lehms	Recitative	A			common time
3	Wer Sünde tut, der ist vom Teufel	Lehms	Aria	A	2Vl (unis.) 2Va (unis.)	E-flat major	cut time

== Music ==
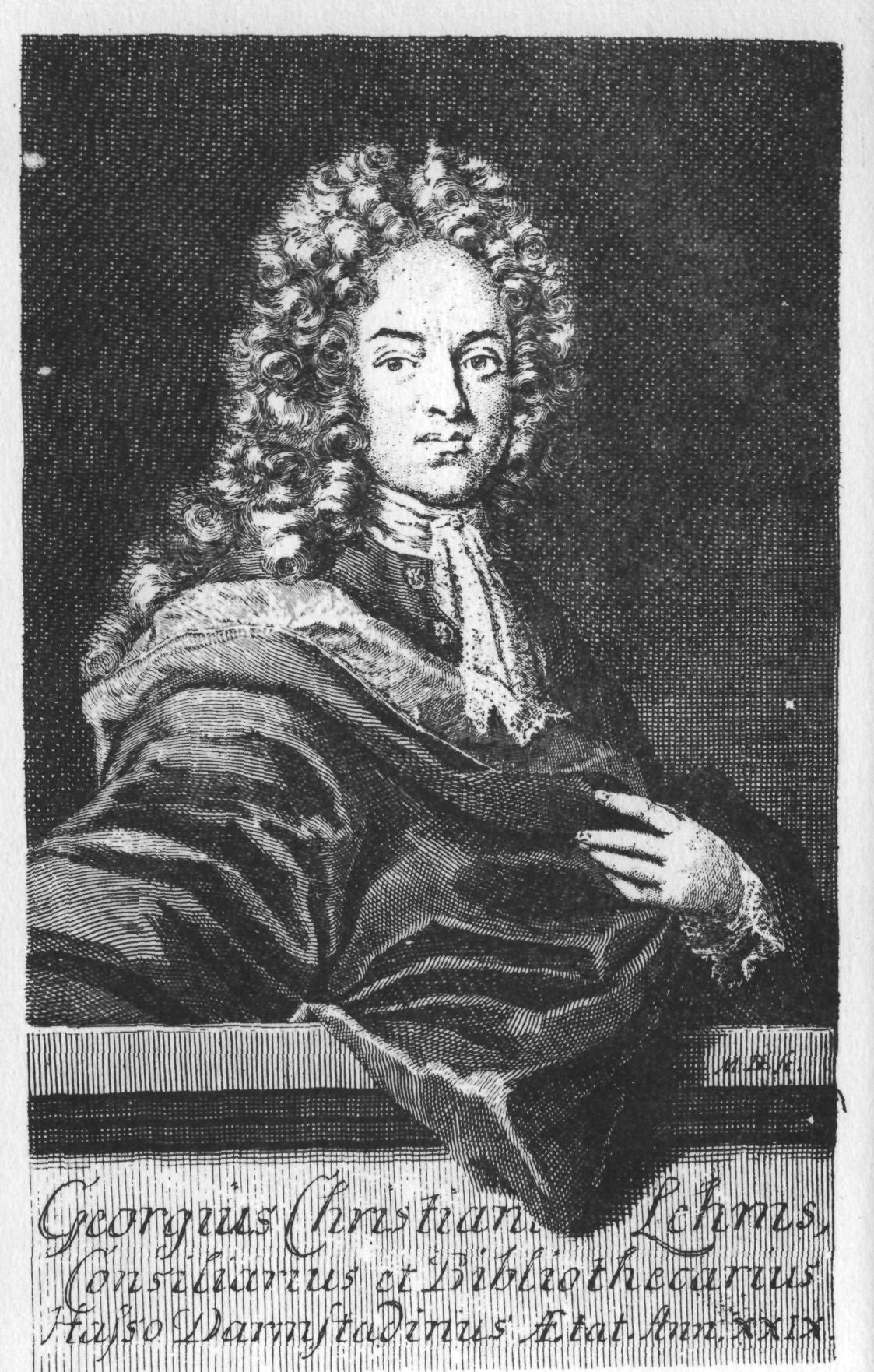
Georg Christian Lehms, copper engraving c. 1713

=== 1 ===
The first movement, "Widerstehe doch der Sünde" (Just resist sin) is a da capo aria, which opens with a surprising dissonance and leaves its key of E-flat major open until a cadence in measure 8. Dürr describes it as a call to resistance and compares it to the beginning of the recitative "Siehe, ich stehe vor der Tür", a call to be ready, in the cantata for Advent Nun komm, der Heiden Heiland, BWV 61, composed in 1714. Gardiner comments: "It is a deliberate shock tactic to rouse his listeners to the need to 'stand firm against all sinning, or its poison will possess you'". Bach used the first aria again in his St Mark Passion.

=== 2 ===
The recitative "Die Art verruchter Sünden" (The way of vile sins) is secco, accompanied by the continuo. The words "So zeigt sich nur ein leerer Schatten und übertünchtes Grab" (It shows itself as only an empty shadow and a whitewashed grave) are expressed in "pale" harmonies. The final lines are arioso and illustrate in Sie ist als wie ein scharfes Schwert, das uns durch Leib und Seele fährt (It is like a sharp sword, that pierces through body and soul) the movement of the sword by fast runs in the continuo.

=== 3 ===
The final aria "Wer Sünde tut, der ist vom Teufel" (He who sins is of the devil) is again a da capo aria, but shows elements of a four-part fugue for the voice, the violins in unison, the violas in unison and the continuo. Gardiner describes the theme as "insinuating chromatic" and the "contorted counter-subject to portray the wily shackles of the devil".

== Recordings ==
The sortable listing is taken from the selection provided by Aryeh Oron on the Bach-Cantatas website. The sortable table is based on the listing on the Bach Cantatas website. The type of orchestra is roughly shown as a large group by red background, and as an ensemble playing period instruments in historically informed performance by green background.

Recordings of Widerstehe doch der Sünde, BWV 54
Title	Conductor / Choir / Orchestra	Soloists	Label	Year	Orch. type
J.S. Bach: Cantatas No. 53, No. 54, No. 170	Hermann Scherchen Orchestra of the Vienna State Opera	Hilde Rössel-Majdan	Westminster	1952	
Alfred Deller Edition 7	Gustav Leonhardt Leonhardt Baroque Ensemble	Alfred Deller	Vanguard	1954	Period
Bach Made in Germany Vol. 2 – Cantatas III	Kurt Thomas Gewandhausorchester	Marga Höffgen	Eterna	1959	
Die Bach Kantate Vol. 43	Helmuth Rilling Bach-Collegium Stuttgart	Julia Hamari	Hänssler	1975	
J. S. Bach: Complete Cantatas Vol. 3	Ton Koopman Amsterdam Baroque Orchestra	Andreas Scholl	Antoine Marchand	1995	Period
Baroque Arias	Masaaki Suzuki Bach Collegium Japan	Yoshikazu Mera	BIS	1996	Period
J.S. Bach: Cantates pour alto (BWV 170, 54, 35)	Philippe Herreweghe Orchestre du Collegium Vocale Gent	Andreas Scholl	Harmonia Mundi	1997	Period
Solo Cantatas	Ludwig Güttler Virtuosi Saxoniae	Christoph Genz	Dresden Classics	1999	
Bach Edition Vol. 5 – Cantatas Vol. 2	Pieter Jan Leusink Netherlands Bach Collegium	Sytse Buwalda	Brilliant Classics	1999	Period
Bach Cantatas Vol. 21: Cambridge/Walpole St Peter / For Quinquagesima Sunday (Estomihi) / For Annunciation / Palm Sunday / Oculi	John Eliot Gardiner English Baroque Soloists	Nathalie Stutzmann	Soli Deo Gloria	2000	Period
J.S. Bach: Cantatas BWV 54, 82 & 170	Jonathan Cohen Arcangelo	Iestyn Davies	Hyperion	2017	Period
The Glenn Gould Collection, Vol. 5 - The conductor	Glenn Gould	Russell Oberlin		1962	

== Sources ==
- Widerstehe doch der Sünde, BWV 54: Scores at the International Music Score Library Project
- Widerstehe doch der Sünde, BWV 54; BC A 51 / Sacred cantata (7th Sunday after Trinity) Leipzig University
- Widerstehe doch der Sünde history, scoring, Bach website (in German)
- BWV 54 Widerstehe doch der Sünde, English translation, University of Vermont
