= Mein Herze schwimmt im Blut, BWV 199 =

Solo church cantata by J. S. Bach

Mein Herze schwimmt im Blut
- BWV 199
- Solo church cantata by J. S. Bach
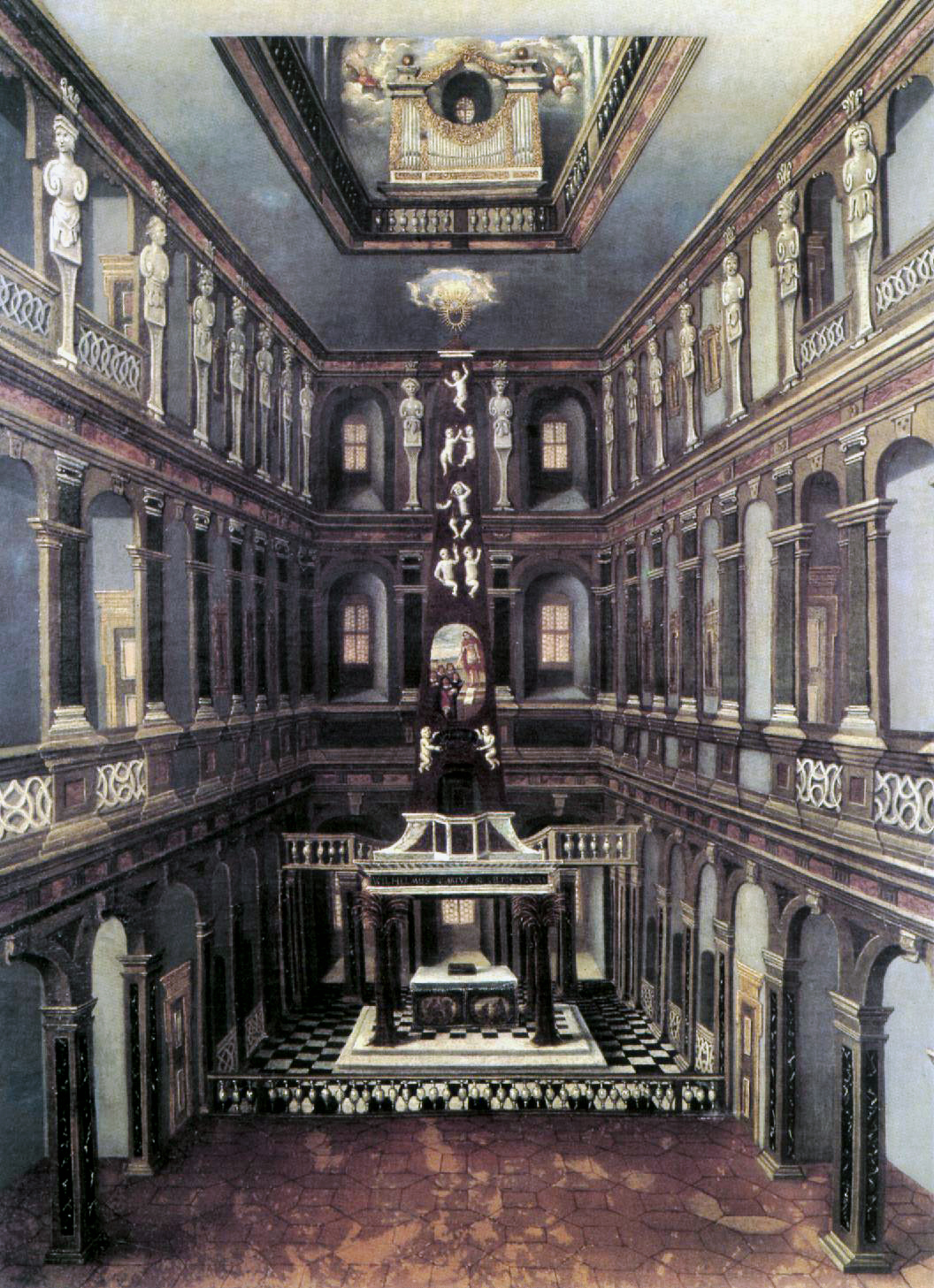
- The Schlosskirche in Weimar
- Occasion: Eleventh Sunday after Trinity
- Cantata text: Georg Christian Lehms
- Chorale: "Wo soll ich fliehen hin" by Johann Heermann
- Performed: 12 August 1714: Weimar
- Movements: eight
- Vocal: soprano
- Instrumental: oboe; 2 violins; viola; violoncello piccolo (Leipzig); continuo with bassoon and violone

Johann Sebastian Bach composed the church cantata Mein Herze schwimmt im Blut (My heart swims in blood) BWV 199 in Weimar between 1712 and 1713, and performed it on the eleventh Sunday after Trinity, 12 August 1714. It is a solo cantata for soprano.

The text was written by Georg Christian Lehms and published in Darmstadt in 1711 in the collection Gottgefälliges Kirchen-Opffer, on the general topic of redemption. The librettist wrote a series of alternating recitatives and arias, and included as the sixth movement (of eight) the third stanza of Johann Heermann's hymn "Wo soll ich fliehen hin". It is not known when Bach composed the work, but he performed it as part of his monthly cantata productions on the eleventh Sunday after Trinity, 12 August 1714. The solo voice is accompanied by a Baroque instrumental ensemble of oboe, strings and continuo. The singer expresses in a style similar to Baroque opera the dramatic development from feeling like a "monster in God's eyes" to being forgiven. Bach revised the work for later performances, leading to three editions in the Neue Bach-Ausgabe.

== History and words ==
On 2 March 1714 Bach was appointed concertmaster of the Weimar court orchestra (Kapelle) of the co-reigning dukes Wilhelm Ernst and Ernst August of Saxe-Weimar. As concertmaster, he assumed the principal responsibility for composing new works, specifically cantatas for the Schlosskirche (palace church), on a monthly schedule. He performed the cantata on the Eleventh Sunday after Trinity as the fifth cantata of the series, following Weinen, Klagen, Sorgen, Zagen, BWV 12. The prescribed readings for the Sunday were from the First Epistle to the Corinthians, on the gospel of Christ and his (Paul's) duty as an apostle (1 Corinthians 15:1–10), and from the Gospel of Luke, the parable of the Pharisee and the Tax Collector (Luke 18:9–14).

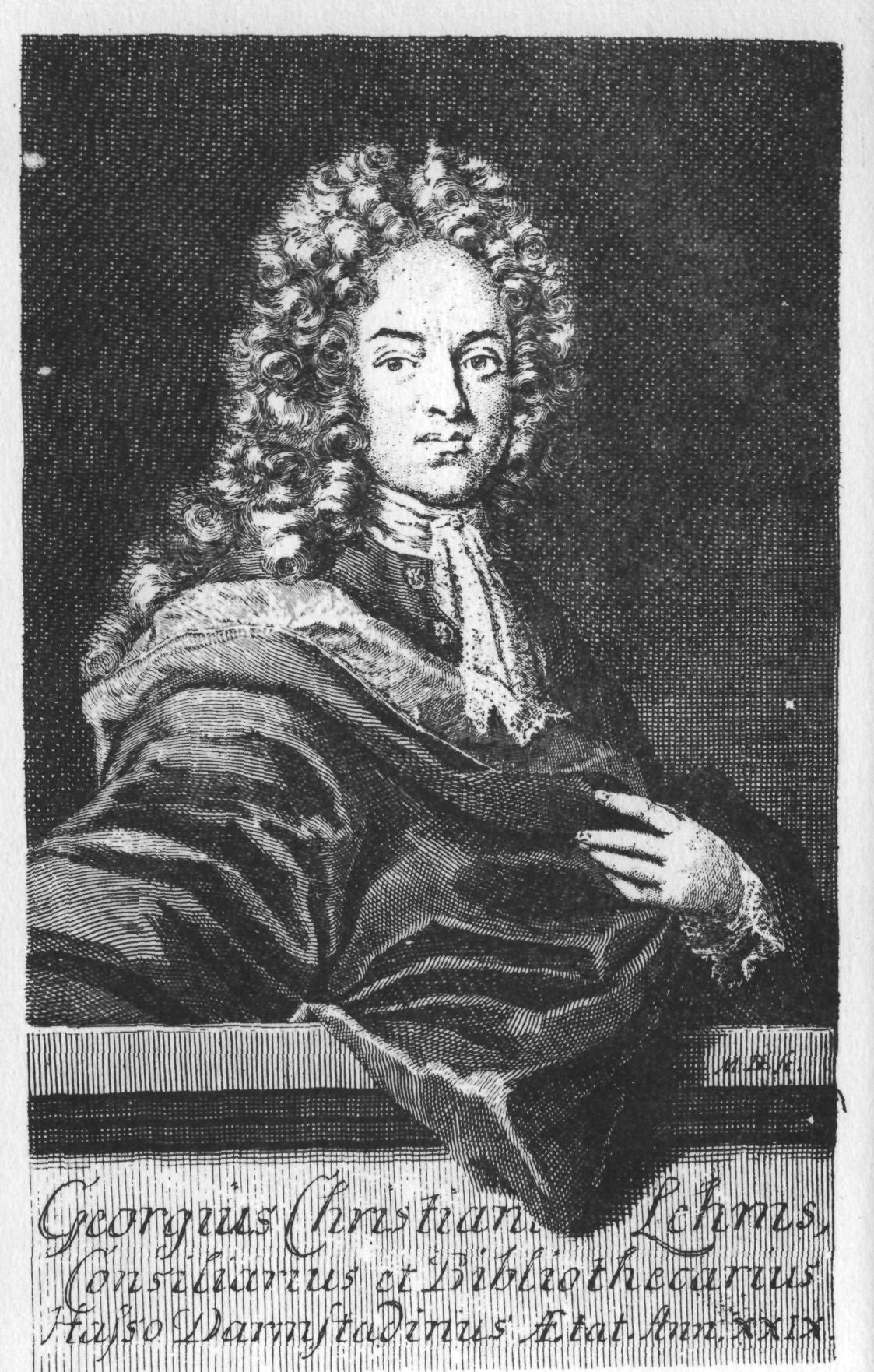
Georg Christian Lehms, copper engraving c. 1713

The text, which concerns a sinner seeking and finding redemption, was written by Georg Christian Lehms. Lehms was based in Darmstadt, and it is not known whether Bach knew him personally, but he may well have had access to Lehms's 1711 publication Gottgefälliges Kirchen-Opffer, which includes this text and that of another solo cantata, Widerstehe doch der Sünde, BWV 54, performed the month before. The third stanza of Johann Heermann's hymn "Wo soll ich fliehen hin" is integrated as the sixth movement, to the melody of "Auf meinen lieben Gott". The text in the first person shows the dramatic change of a person initially feeling as "a monster in God's eyes" to finally feeling accepted as God's child. The cantata text was set to music in 1712 by Christoph Graupner in Darmstadt. It is not known if Bach knew of Graupner's composition. The text has no specific relation to the prescribed readings, therefore it is possible that Bach may have already composed the work before his promotion to concert master with regular Sunday services, like the other cantata on a text by Lehms.

Bach first performed the cantata on 12 August 1714. When he performed it again in Leipzig on the eleventh Sunday after Trinity in 1723 (8 August) it was the first solo cantata and the most operatic work which he had presented to the congregation up to that point. He made revisions for that performance, such as transposing it from C minor to D minor and changing the obbligato viola to violoncello piccolo. In the same service, he also performed a new work, Siehe zu, daß deine Gottesfurcht nicht Heuchelei sei, BWV 179: one before and one after the sermon.

The Neue Bach-Ausgabe recognises three distinct versions: the Weimar version, a Köthen version, and the Leipzig version.

== Music ==
=== Structure and scoring ===
The cantata, structured in eight movements, is scored as chamber music for a solo soprano voice (S), and a Baroque instrumental ensemble of oboe (Ob), violins (Vl), viola (Va), and basso continuo (Bc) including bassoon (Fg) and violone (Vo). In the Weimar version, it is in C minor, with a viola as the obbligato instrument in movement 6. The title page of the parts for this version reads: "Geistliche Cantate / Mein Herze schwimt im Blut / â / Soprano solo / 1 Hautb. / 2 Viol. / Viola / e / Basso / di / J.S.Bach". In the Leipzig version, it is in D minor, with an obbligato violoncello piccolo instead of the viola.

In the following table of the movements, the scoring follows the Neue Bach-Ausgabe. The keys and time signatures are taken from Alfred Dürr, using the symbol for common time (4/4). The continuo, playing throughout, is not shown.

Movements of Mein Herze schwimmt im Blut
No.	Title	Text	Type	Vocal	Winds	Strings	Key	Time
1	Mein Herze schwimmt im Blut	Lehms	Recitative	S	Fg	2Vl Va	C minor	common time
2	Stumme Seufzer, stille Klagen	Lehms	Aria	S	Ob	Vo	C minor	common time
3	Doch Gott muss mir genädig sein	Lehms	Recitative	S	Fg	2Vl Va Vo		common time
4	Tief gebückt und voller Reue	Lehms	Aria	S	Fg	2Vl Va Vo	E♭ major	3/4
5	Auf diese Schmerzensreu	Lehms	Recitative	S		Vo		common time
6	Ich, dein betrübtes Kind	Heermann	Chorale	S		Va (solo) Vo	F major	common time
7	Ich lege mich in diese Wunden	Lehms	Recitative	S	Fg	2Vl Va Vo		common time
8	Wie freudig ist mein Herz	Lehms	Aria	S	Ob Fg	2Vl Va	B♭ major	6/8

=== Movements ===
Although limited to one soprano voice, Bach achieves a variety of musical expression in the eight movements. All but one recitative are accompanied by the strings (accompagnato), and only movement 5 is secco, accompanied by the continuo only. The solo voice is treated to dramatic declamation, close to contemporary opera.

==== 1 ====
A recitative sets the scene, "Mein Herze schwimmt im Blut" ("My heart swims in blood").

Mein Herze schwimmt im Blut,
Weil mich der Sünden Brut
In Gottes heilgen Augen
Zum Ungeheuer macht.

My heart swims in blood,
since the offspring of my sins
in the holy eyes of God
make me a monster.

The musicologist Julian Mincham explains that it "drips with the self-obsessed agonies of sin, pain and abandonment ... with the torment of an abandoned soul swamped by its own sin and sorrow. Its finely wrought contours portray dramatically the vacillating emotions ranging from horror and terror to lonely and dispirited resignation."

==== 2 ====
The first aria, a da capo aria, "Stumme Seufzer, stille Klagen" (Mute sighs, silent cries), is accompanied by the oboe. The theme of the ritornello is present throughout the movement. The middle section begins with a dissonance to stress the sorrowful image of "Und ihr nassen Tränenquellen" ("And you, moist springs of tears"). It ends with a passage set as a secco recitative, described by Mincham: "Time almost appears to stand still with this final expression of misery".

==== 3 ====
The following recitative, "Doch Gott muss mir genädig sein" ("But God must be gracious to me"), ends in a statement of repentance.

==== 4 ====
The second aria, "Tief gebückt und voller Reue" ("Deeply bowed and filled with regret"), is dominated by rich string sound. An adagio passage leads to the da capo. The aria expresses repentance in a "civilised and refined minuet".

==== 5 ====
A short secco recitative, "Auf diese Schmerzensreu" ("Upon this painful repentance"), introduces the following hymn stanza. It begins with "a musical echo of the torments of the heart swimming in blood".

==== 6 ====
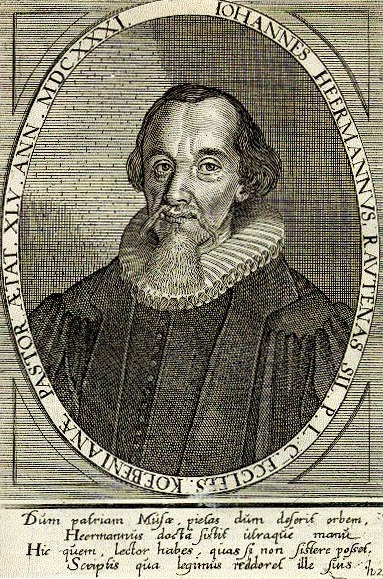
Johann Heermann, the hymn writer

The only chorale stanza of the work is "Ich, dein betrübtes Kind" ("I, Your troubled child"), the third stanza of Johann Heermann's "Wo soll ich fliehen hin" ("Where should I flee"), published in 1630. Its term "troubled child" is a good summary of the position of the human being in relation to God. The wording of its conclusion, "In deine tiefen Wunden, da ich stets Heil gefunden" ("into Your deep wounds, where I have always found salvation") leads to the following recitative. The voice is accompanied by an obbligato viola (violoncello piccolo in the Leipzig version) in a lively figuration.

Bach used a rather unusual melody by Caspar von Stieler, whereas he based his later chorale cantata on this hymn on the melody by Jacob Regnart. The hymn is treated as in a chorale fantasia, with string ritornellos between the verses.

==== 7 ====
The last recitative, "Ich lege mich in diese Wunden" ("I lay myself on these wounds"), introduces a different mood; the final measures are a "soaring melisma", a "joyously uplifting prelude" to the last movement.

==== 8 ====
The final aria, "Wie freudig ist mein Herz" ("How joyful is my heart"), expresses joy as a cheerful gigue, with a long coloratura on "fröhlich" (joyful). It is comparable to the gigues in Bach's French Suites. Mincham concludes:

This cantata, expressed throughout in the first person, is highly personal. It makes a clear and dramatic journey from the cesspools of sinful misery to the euphoria of redemption and salvation. It has no trumpets, horns or drums to drive its message home; they are not needed within this highly private context.

== Recordings ==
The work has been recorded often, both by Bach specialists and others. The listing is taken from the selection on the Bach Cantatas Website, which lists 58 recordings as of 2017. Ensembles playing on period instruments in historically informed performance are marked by green background.

Recordings of Mein Herze schwimmt im Blut, BWV 199
Title	Conductor / Choir / Orchestra	Soloists	Label	Year	Orch. type
Elisabeth Schwarzkopf: The Unpublished EMI Recordings 1955–1958 – Bach & Mozart	Thurston Dart Philharmonia Orchestra	Elisabeth Schwarzkopf	EMI	1968	
Bach Cantatas Vol. 4 – Sundays after Trinity I	Karl Richter Münchener Bach-Orchester	Edith Mathis	Archiv Produktion	1972	
Die Bach Kantate Vol. 48	Helmuth Rilling Bach-Collegium Stuttgart	Arleen Augér	Hänssler	1976	
J. S. Bach: Cantatas BWV 202 · 82a · 199	Dominique Debart L'Ensemble de Basse-Normandie	Teresa Żylis-Gara	Rudolphe	1986	
J. S. Bach: Das Kantatenwerk · Complete Cantatas · Les Cantates, Folge / Vol. 45	Nikolaus Harnoncourt Concentus Musicus Wien	Barbara Bonney	Teldec	1989	Period
J. S. Bach: Complete Cantatas Vol. 2	Ton Koopman Amsterdam Baroque Orchestra	Barbara Schlick	Antoine Marchand	1995	Period
J. S. Bach: Cantata BWV 199 Mein Herze schwimmt in Blut	Bruno Weil Carmel Bach Festival Orchestra	Rosa Lamoreaux	Jonathan Wentworth	1998	
Bach Edition Vol. 5 – Cantatas Vol. 3	Pieter Jan Leusink Netherlands Bach Collegium	Ruth Holton	Brilliant Classics	1999	Period
Bach Cantatas	John Eliot Gardiner English Baroque Soloists	Magdalena Kozena	Archiv Produktion	2000	Period
Bach: Cantatas BWV 82 and 199	Craig Smith Emmanuel Music	Lorraine Hunt Lieberson	Nonesuch	2003	
J.S. Bach: Cantatas for soprano (BWV 202, 152, 199)	Petra Müllejans Freiburg Barockorchester	Carolyn Sampson	Harmonia Mundi	2016	Period

== Sources ==
- Mein Herze schwimmt im Blut, BWV 199: Scores at the International Music Score Library Project
- "Mein Herze schwimmt im Blut (Weimarer Fassung) BWV 199; BC A 120a / Sacred cantata (11th Sunday after Trinity)". Bach Digital.
- "Mein Herze schwimmt im Blut (Köthen version) BWV 199; BC A 120b / Sacred cantata (11th Sunday after Trinity)". Bach Digital.
- "Mein Herze schwimmt im Blut (Leipzig version) BWV 199; BC A 120c / Sacred cantata (11th Sunday after Trinity)". Bach Digital.
- BWV 199 Mein Herze schwimmt im Blut English translation, University of Vermont
