= Selig ist der Mann, BWV 57 =

Church cantata by Bach

Selig ist der Mann
- BWV 57
- Christmas cantata by J. S. Bach
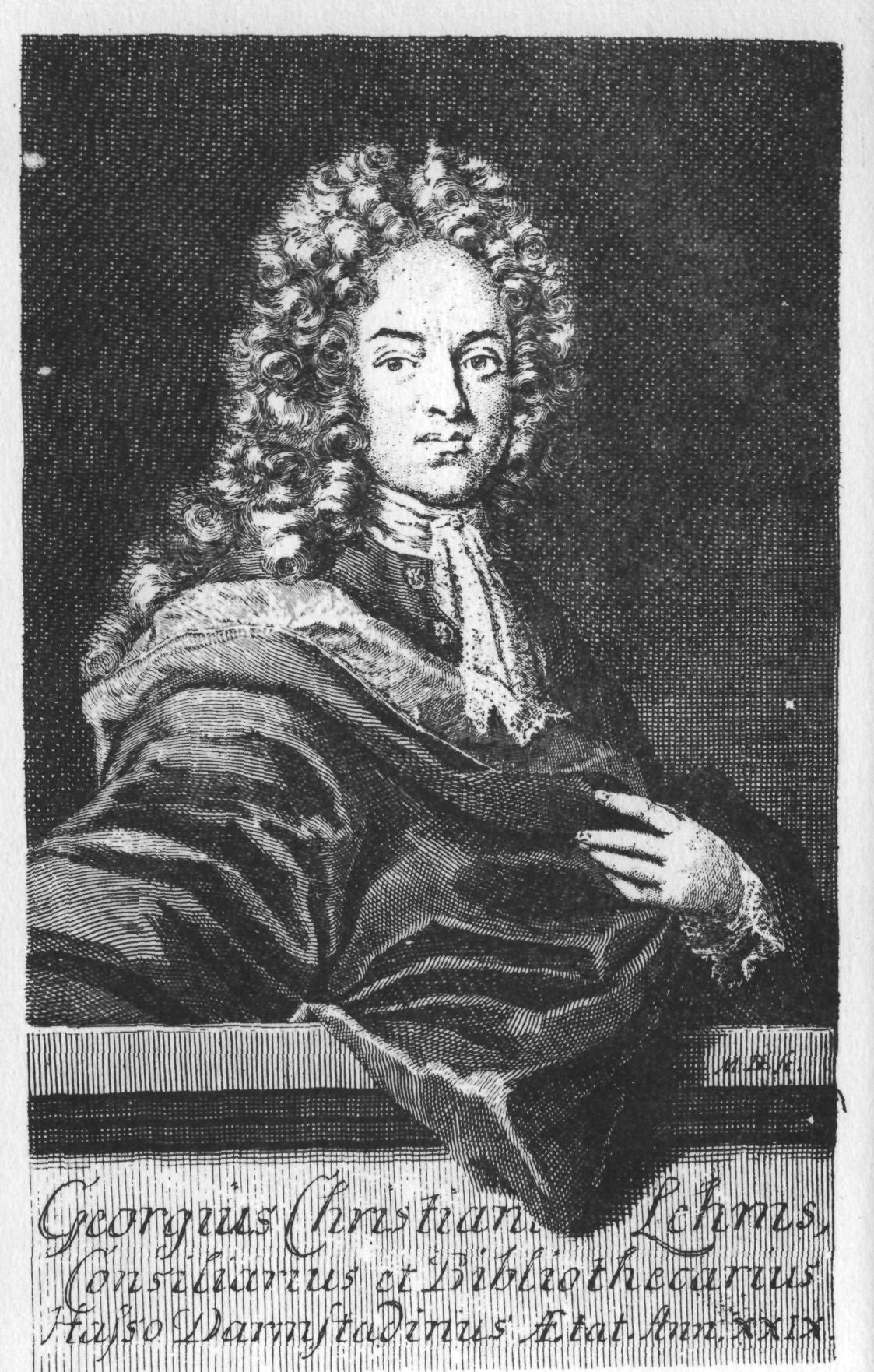
- Georg Christian Lehms, the poet of the text
- Occasion: Second Day of Christmas; Saint Stephen's Day
- Cantata text: Georg Christian Lehms
- Bible text: James 1:12
- Chorale: by Ahasverus Fritsch
- Performed: 26 December 1725: Leipzig
- Movements: 8
- Vocal: soprano and bass solo; SATB choir
- Instrumental: 2 oboes; oboe da caccia; 2 violins; viola; continuo

Selig ist der Mann (Blessed is the man), BWV 57, is a church cantata by Johann Sebastian Bach. He wrote the Christmas cantata in Leipzig in 1725 for the Second Day of Christmas, which was celebrated that year as Saint Stephen's Day, and first performed it on 26 December 1725.

== History and text ==
Bach wrote the cantata in his third year in Leipzig for the Second Day of Christmas. That year, as every other year in Leipzig, the day was the feast of the martyr Saint Stephanus (Stephen). The prescribed readings for the day are from the Acts, the Martyrdom of Stephen (Acts 6:8–7,22, Acts 7:51–59), and from the Gospel of Matthew, Jerusalem killing her prophets (Matthew 23:35–39). The cantata text was written by Georg Christian Lehms, who drew on all the readings and connected them to more biblical allusions. The first line is taken from James 1:12, the crown mentioned is in Greek "stephanos". Lehms set the development as a dialogue of "Jesus" and the Soul ("Anima"). He intended to use as a closing chorale a verse from Johann Heermann's "Gott Lob, die Stund ist kommen", but Bach instead chose the 6th verse of Ahasverus Fritsch's "Hast du denn, Jesus, dein Angesicht gänzlich verborgen", called Seelengespräch mit Christus (Talk of the soul with Christ), in order to continue the dialogue.

Bach first performed the cantata on 26 December 1725.

== Scoring and structure ==
The setting for the cantata in seven movements is intimate: soprano and bass soloists, two oboes, oboe da caccia, two violins, viola, and continuo. The Anima is sung by the soprano, the bass is the vox Christi, the voice of Jesus. A four-part choir is only needed for the closing chorale, if at all. The oboes play only in the first and last movement, doubling the strings.

1. Aria (bass): Selig ist der Mann
2. Recitative (soprano): Ach! dieser süße Trost
3. Aria (soprano): Ich wünschte mir den Tod, den Tod
4. Recitative (soprano, bass): Ich reiche dir die Hand
5. Aria (bass): Ja, ja, ich kann die Feinde schlagen
6. Recitative (soprano, bass): In meinem Schoß liegt Ruh und Leben
7. Aria (soprano): Ich ende behende mein irdisches Leben
8. Chorale: Richte dich, Liebste, nach meinem Gefallen und gläube

== Music ==
The music for the dialogue of Jesus and the Soul is more dramatic than in other church cantatas by Bach. Most of the recitatives are secco, as in the opera of the time, driving the action. John Eliot Gardiner sees Bach here as the "best writer of dramatic declamation (recitative in other words) since Monteverdi". The first aria is dominated by long vocal phrases. In the second aria the longing for death is expressed by an upwards line followed by a wide interval down. The third aria shows Jesus as the victor by fanfare-like broken triads. In the last aria the line of the solo violin can be interpreted as the passionate movement of the Anima into the arms of Jesus. After a mystical union is reached in the second part of the aria, "Mein Heiland, ich sterbe mit höchster Begier" ("My Savior, I die with the greatest eagerness"), no da capo is possible; the aria ends on the question "was schenkest du mir?" ("what will You give me?"), answered by the final four-part chorale on the tune of "Lobe den Herren, den mächtigen König der Ehren".

== Recordings ==
- Willem Mengelberg – Volume 1 (J. S. Bach), Willem Mengelberg, Concertgebouw Orchestra, Jo Vincent, Max Kloos, Mengelberg Edition 1940
- Bach Made in Germany Vol. 1 – Cantatas I, Günther Ramin, Thomanerchor, Gewandhausorchester Leipzig, Agnes Giebel, Johannes Oettel, Berlin / Leipzig Classics 1951
- J. S. Bach: Cantata No. 140, Cantata No. 57, Karl Ristenpart, Chorus of the Conservatory of Sarrebruck, Chamber Orchestra of the Saar, Ursula Buckel, Jakob Stämpfli, Club Francais du Disque 1962
- Les Grandes Cantates de J. S. Bach Vol. 13, Fritz Werner, Heinrich-Schütz-Chor Heilbronn, Pforzheim Chamber Orchestra, Agnes Giebel, Barry McDaniel, Erato 1963
- Johann Sebastian Bach: Cantatas Nos 57, 58, 59 & 152, Pál Németh, Savaria Vocal Ensemble, Capella Savaria, Mária Zádori, László Polgar, Hungaroton 1989
- Bach Cantatas Vol. 15: New York, John Eliot Gardiner, Monteverdi Choir, English Baroque Soloists, Joanne Lunn, Peter Harvey, Soli Deo Gloria 2000
- J. S. Bach: Complete Cantatas Vol. 17, Ton Koopman, Amsterdam Baroque Orchestra & Choir, Sibylla Rubens, Klaus Mertens, Antoine Marchand 2002
- Bach: Dialogue Cantatas · Dialogkantaten, Rainer Kussmaul, RIAS Kammerchor, Berliner Barock Solisten, Dorothea Röschmann, Thomas Quasthoff, Deutsche Grammophon 2007
- J. S. Bach: Cantatas Vol. 43, Masaaki Suzuki, Bach Collegium Japan, Hana Blažíková, Peter Kooy, BIS 2008
- Alfredo Bernardini, Kirchheimer BachConsort, Hana Blažíková, Dominik Wörner J. S. Bach Dialogkantaten BWV 32, 57, 58. cpo, 2016.
- Helmut Winschermann Deutsche Bachsolisten Elly Ameling Hermann Prey PHILIPS/1980 LP and CD 10 Festkantaten

== Sources ==
- Selig ist der Mann, BWV 57: Scores at the International Music Score Library Project
- Selig ist der Mann, der die Anfechtung erduldet (Dialogus) BWV 57; BC A 14 / Sacred cantata (2nd Christmas Day) Leipzig University
- Cantata BWV 57 Selig ist der Mann history, scoring, sources for text and music, translations to various languages, discography, discussion, bach-cantatas website
- BWV 57 Selig ist der Mann English translation, University of Vermont
- BWV 57 Selig ist der Mann text, scoring, University of Alberta
- Chapter 7 BWV 57 Selig ist der Mann / Blessed is the Man. Julian Mincham, 2010
