= Geist und Seele wird verwirret, BWV 35 =

Church cantata by Johann Sebastian Bach

Geist und Seele wird verwirret
- BWV 35
- Solo church cantata by J. S. Bach
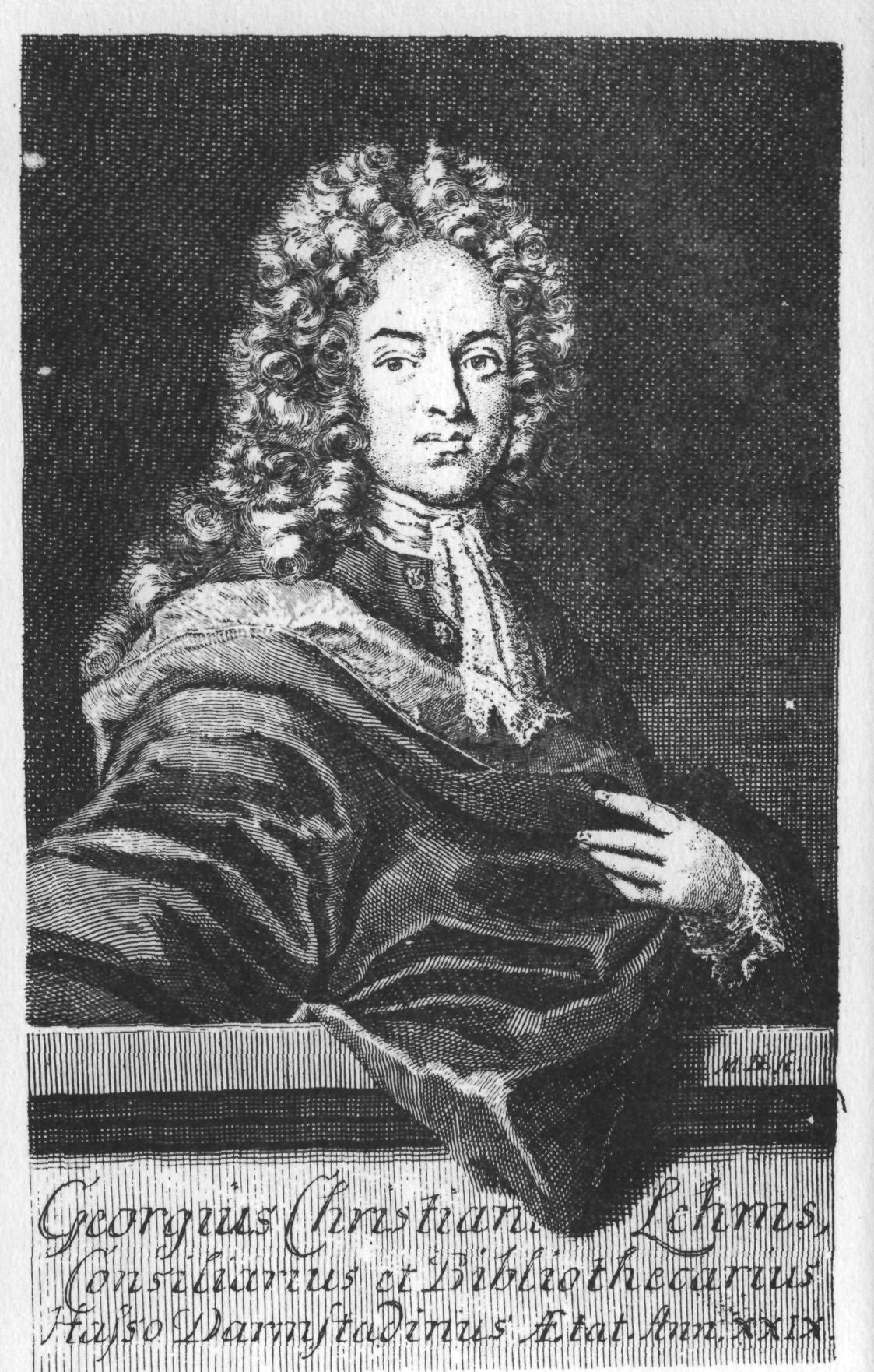
- Georg Christian Lehms, author of the text
- Occasion: Twelfth Sunday after Trinity
- Performed: 8 September 1726: Leipzig
- Movements: seven, in two parts
- Vocal: alto
- Instrumental: oboes; taille; organ; strings; continuo

Geist und Seele wird verwirret (Spirit and soul become confused), BWV 35, is a church cantata by Johann Sebastian Bach. He composed the solo cantata for alto voice in Leipzig for the twelfth Sunday after Trinity and first performed it on 8 September 1726.

Bach composed the cantata in his fourth year as Thomaskantor (director of church music) in Leipzig. The text is based on the day's prescribed reading from the Gospel of Mark, the healing of a deaf mute man. The librettist is Georg Christian Lehms. The text quotes ideas from the gospel and derives from these the analogy that as the tongue of the deaf mute man was opened, the believer should be open to admire God's miraculous deeds. The cantatas for this Sunday have a positive character, which Bach stressed in earlier works for the occasion by including trumpets in the score. In this work, he uses instead an obbligato solo organ in several movements.

The cantata is structured in seven movements in two parts, to be performed before and after the sermon. Both parts are opened by an instrumental sinfonia with solo organ, probably derived from concerto music composed earlier in Weimar or Köthen. The alto singer performs a sequence of alternating arias and recitatives, accompanied in all three arias by the organ as an equal partner. The Baroque instrumental ensemble is formed by two oboes, taille, strings and basso continuo. The alto part is demanding and was probably written with a specific singer in mind, as with the two other solo cantatas composed in the same period.

== Background ==
Bach composed his first solo cantata on a text by Georg Christian Lehms, Widerstehe doch der Sünde, BWV 54, during his tenure in Weimar. Bach was appointed Thomaskantor (director of church music) in 1723 in Leipzig. There he was responsible for the music at four churches, and the training and education of the boys singing in the Thomanerchor boys' choir. He took office on 30 May 1723. In the new position, Bach decided to compose church cantatas for almost all liturgical events for the first twelve months; they became his first cantata cycle. These were for Sundays and feast days of the Christian liturgical year, except for the "silent times" of Advent (before Christmas) and Lent (before Easter). The following year, Bach wrote a second cantata cycle, now basing each on a Lutheran hymn. In 1725, his third year in the post, Bach slowed down his composing and began to perform cantatas by other composers. Until Christmas, cantatas from that year are only extant for four occasions: three Sundays and Reformation Day on 31 October. For Christmas 1725, Bach composed a complete set for the season, all of them to older librettos. Bach rarely chose older librettos for his cantatas in his first years in Leipzig; the conductor Craig Smith even suggested that parts of Geist und Seele wird verwirret may have been composed earlier than the first recorded Leipzig performance.

Bach composed Geist und Seele wird verwirret in 1726, his fourth year in the position, for the Twelfth Sunday after Trinity. It is regarded as part of his third cantata cycle. Bach set the text for a solo alto. The cantata is one of three that he wrote in Leipzig in 1726 in which an alto is the only vocal soloist, the others being Vergnügte Ruh, beliebte Seelenlust, BWV 170, for the sixth Sunday after Trinity, and Gott soll allein mein Herze haben, BWV 169. It seems likely that Bach had a capable alto singer from the Thomanerchor at his disposal during this period. It has also been suggested that Bach had himself in mind as the organ soloist given the prominence of the writing for that instrument. The amount of organ music in the cantata perhaps indicates that it was composed for a seasonal choral absentia at the Thomaskirche.

Bach had earlier composed two other cantatas for the twelfth Sunday after Trinity, in his first year in Leipzig Lobe den Herrn, meine Seele, BWV 69a, first performed on 15 August 1723, and in his third year Lobe den Herren, den mächtigen König der Ehren, BWV 137, first performed on 19 August 1725, as an added part of his cycle of chorale cantatas. Both works focus on praise (Lob) and use an orchestra including festive trumpets.

== Readings and text ==
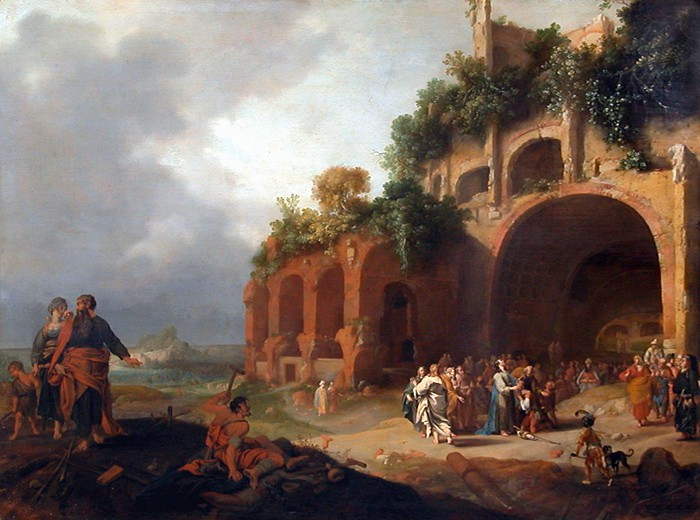
The topic of the gospel, Christ healing the deaf mute man, by Bartholomeus Breenbergh, 1635

The prescribed readings for the Sunday were from the Second Epistle to the Corinthians, the ministry of the Spirit (2 Corinthians 3:4–11), and from the Gospel of Mark, the healing of a deaf mute man (Mark 7:31–37). The cantata text was written by Georg Christian Lehms, a librarian and court poet in Darmstadt, and published in Gottgefälliges Kirchen-Opffer in 1711. The text was published also by Christoph Birkmann in 1728.

The text by Lehms is a cantata in the sense of the time: including no Biblical text and no chorale, and to be performed by one voice, without reference to a chorale melody. Erdmann Neumeister had described a cantata in 1702 as music that "looks no different from a piece from an opera, composed of recitatives and arias".

The text remains close to the Gospel, connecting the healing of the deaf man to the thoughts of a believer who is left deaf and mute in awe looking at the healing of Jesus and God's creation. The text of the first aria, the second movement, is almost a quote of the gospel's last verse. The text of the recitative following includes a paraphrase of Lamentations 3:22–23. The second part of the libretto prays that the ears and tongues of the listeners may also be opened, to praise God as his children and heirs. It is an expression of personal devotion leaning towards meditation.

== Performance ==
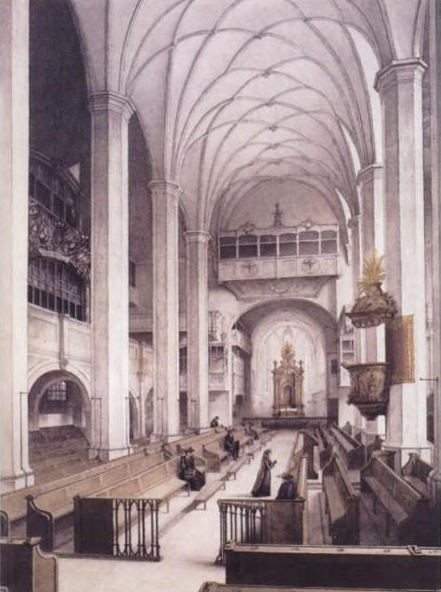
19th-century engraving of the Thomaskirche

Bach led the first performance on 8 September 1726 at the Thomaskirche, and probably played the organ part himself. The sermon was delivered by Christian Weise.

== Structure and scoring ==
Bach structured the cantata in two parts, four movements to be performed before the sermon, three after the sermon. Both parts begin with a sinfonia. Bach scored the cantata for an alto soloist and a Baroque instrumental ensemble of two oboes (Ob), taille (Ot), obbligato solo organ (Org), two violins (Vl), viola (Va), and basso continuo (Bc). Dürr gave the duration as around 31 minutes. He set the text as written, without the addition of a closing chorale. The work has two large concerto movements for organ and orchestra, probably adapted from a lost concerto for oboe or violin. Bach may have derived another movement from the same concerto. The opening Sinfonia was likely based on the same source as the fragment BWV 1059, an abandoned concerto for harpsichord.

In the following table of the movements, the scoring follows the Neue Bach-Ausgabe. The keys and time signatures are taken from Alfred Dürr, using the symbol for common time (4/4). The instruments are shown separately for winds, strings, and organ and continuo.

Movements of Geist und Seele wird verwirret – Part 1
No.	Title	Text	Type	Vocal	Winds	Strings	Others	Key	Time
1	Sinfonia				2Ob Ot	2Vl Va	Org Bc	D minor	common time
2	Geist und Seele wird verwirret	Lehms	Aria	Alto	2Ob Ot	2Vl Va	Org Bc	A minor	6/8
3	Ich wundre mich	Lehms	Recitative	Alto			Bc		common time
4	Gott hat alles wohlgemacht	Lehms	Aria	Alto			Org Bc	F major	common time

Movements of Geist und Seele wird verwirret – Part 2
No.	Title	Text	Type	Vocal	Winds	Strings	Others	Key	Time
5	Sinfonia				2Ob Ot	2Vl Va	Org Bc		3/8
6	Ach, starker Gott	Lehms	Recitative	Alto			Bc		common time
7	Ich wünsche nur bei Gott zu leben	Lehms	Aria	Alto	2Ob Ot	2Vl Va	Org Bc	C major	3/8

=== Movements ===
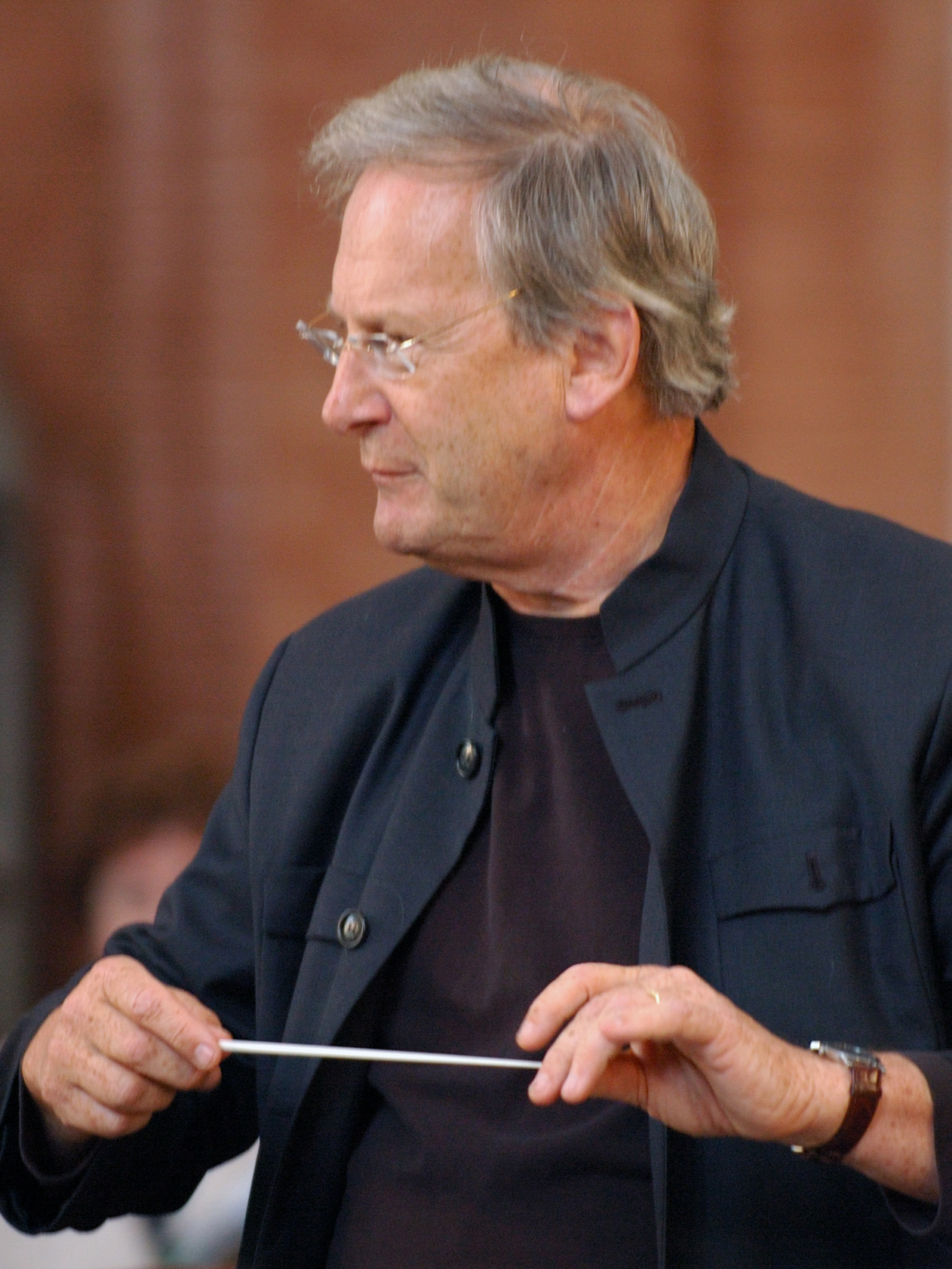
John Eliot Gardiner, who conducted the Bach Cantata Pilgrimage

John Eliot Gardiner conducted Geist und Seele wird verwirret, as part of the Bach Cantata Pilgrimage with the Monteverdi Choir in 2000, on the twelfth Sunday after Trinity in St. Jakob, Köthen, Bach's workplace before he went to Leipzig. Gardiner calls the occasion "one of the most cheerful programmes of the whole Trinity season", leading Bach to compose "celebratory pieces", two with trumpets and timpani, and finally this one with an obbligato organ. In an expanded two-part structure, the organ is both an instrumental soloist in the two sinfonias and a partner for the singer as the obbligato instrument in all three arias. The musicologist Laurence Dreyfus distinguished Bach's use of the organ as "sacred icon" versus "galant conversationalist", writing on Bach's "assimilation of the secular solo concerto into his church cantatas and his adjustment of the normal concerto principle, that of soloist-versus-orchestra, through subtle shifts in role playing, the instrument now posing as a soloist, now retreating into the background".

=== 1 ===
The opening allegro sinfonia incorporates concerto techniques, suggesting an origin in a pre-existing concerto. The organ performs both the solo melody and the continuo line, punctuated by quasi-cadenza passages and interspersed ten-measure ritornellos. The Bach scholar Klaus Hofmann notes that in the movement in Italian style, the theme is "subjected to intensive thematic working-out in the dialogue between solo instrument and orchestra".

=== 2 ===
The first aria in da capo form, "Geist und Seele wird verwirret" (Spirit and soul become confused), is characterized by a broken ritornello and a sense of confusion and uncertainty. The rhythm is siciliano, a frequent feature in slow concerto movements by Bach and others. Hofmann concludes from many corrections in Bach's autograph that the aria is a new composition. He sees the "agility of the organ part which does not follow the siciliano pattern" as an image of the "confusion" mentioned in the text.

=== 3 ===
A secco recitative, "Ich wundre mich" (I am amazed), expresses awe at the creation, rendered in the first person. Beginning in a major mode which contrasts with the preceding aria, it then turns to a minor mode.

=== 4 ===
An aria with obbligato organ, "Gott hat alles wohlgemacht" (God has made everything well), is the first movement in a major mode, expressing pleasure with God's creation. It has a dominating two-part ritornello. Hofmann observes that the organ, this time the only partner of the voice, is "rich in coloratura" and has a theme, "heard throughout the movement, sometimes in the manner of an ostinato, sometimes freely developed; in its figuration and motoric drive it is stylized just like Bach’s writing for the violoncello piccolo". Gardiner notes that not only the tessitura but also "characteristic string-crossing patterns" are reminiscent of violoncello piccolo use.

=== 5 ===
Part 2 begins with another sinfonia, this time in binary form. Hofmann describes it as "an engaging perpetuum mobile introduced by the keyboard". It may be based on the final movement of a concerto. The organ interacts with the orchestra without a prelude, which is unusual in Bach's concertos, but not without precedent, such as the harpsichord concerto in F major, BWV 1057.

=== 6 ===
Another secco recitative, "Ach, starker Gott, laß mich" (Ah, powerful God, let me [think upon this continually]), is a prayer for the ability to always reflect on the miracle of creation. It quotes Jesus saying "Hephata" (Be opened) to the deaf mute man, and turns it to "the believer's heart would open up and his tongue would be loosened so that he might perceive and praise the divine miracles".

=== 7 ===
The cantata concludes with an aria with the complete orchestra, "Ich wünsche nur bei Gott zu leben" (I wish to live with God alone). It expresses the wish to dwell with God forever in a minuet of positive character. The movement again uses a two-part ritornello. When contrasting aspects of life on earth are mentioned in the middle section, such as "jammerreichen Schmerzensjoch" (sorrowful yoke of pain) and "martervollen Leben" (tormented life), the music darkens to minor keys. The organ supplies triplet figures, which the voice also uses to express "ein fröhliches Halleluja" (a joyful hallelujah). Dürr point out that the movement expresses as firmly a "yes" to death as the second movement about the healing was a "yes" to life, and explains that for a person at Bach's time, life on earth was only a mirror of a future "face to face" with God.

== Recordings ==
Bach's church cantatas have been frequently performed, including complete cycles such as the first one on period instruments by Nikolaus Harnoncourt and Gustav Leonhardt. The table of recordings for Geist und Seele wird verwirret is based on the listing on the Bach Cantatas website. Ensembles playing period instruments in historically informed performance are marked by a green background.

Title	Conductor / Ensemble	Soloists	Label	Year	Instr.
J. S. Bach: Cantatas No. 42, No. 35	Hermann Scherchen Vienna Radio Symphony Orchestra	Maureen Forrester	Westminster / Baroque Music Club	1964	
J. S. Bach: Das Kantatenwerk – Sacred Cantatas Vol. 2	Nikolaus Harnoncourt Concentus Musicus Wien	Paul Esswood	Teldec	1974	Period
Die Bach Kantate Vol. 49	Helmuth Rilling Bach-Collegium Stuttgart	Julia Hamari	Hänssler	1984	
Bach Kantaten BWV 35, BWV 169, BWV 49 (Sinfonia)	Hartmut Haenchen Kammerorchester Carl Philipp Emanuel Bach	Jochen Kowalski	Berlin Classics	1994	Period
J. S. Bach: Cantates pour alto ...	Philippe Herreweghe Collegium Vocale Gent	Andreas Scholl	Harmonia Mundi France	1997	Period
Bach Edition Vol. 8 – Cantatas Vol. 3	Pieter Jan Leusink Netherlands Bach Collegium	Sytse Buwalda	Brilliant Classics	1999	Period
Bach Cantatas Vol. 6: Köthen/Frankfurt	John Eliot Gardiner English Baroque Soloists	Robin Tyson	Soli Deo Gloria	2000	Period
J. S. Bach: Complete Cantatas Vol. 17	Ton Koopman Amsterdam Baroque Orchestra	Nathalie Stutzmann	Antoine Marchand	2001	Period
J. S. Bach: Cantatas for the Complete Liturgical Year Vol. 5	Sigiswald Kuijken La Petite Bande	Petra Noskaiová	Accent	2006	Period
J.S. Bach: Cantatas Vol. 37 – Leipzig Cantatas	Masaaki Suzuki Bach Collegium Japan	Robin Blaze	BIS	2006	Period
