= Olga Olgina =

Polish opera singer and teacher (1904–1979)

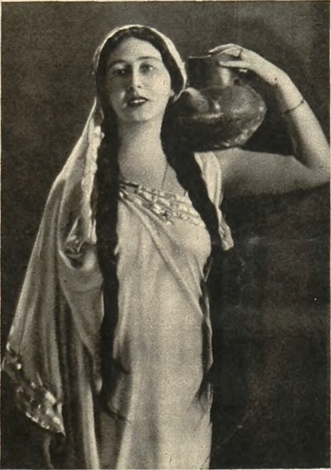
- Olgina in 1935
- Born: Olga Józefowicz; 24 June 1904; Yaroslavl, Russian Empire
- Died: 31 January 1979 (aged 74); Łódź, Poland
- Other name: Irene Larar
- Occupations: Operatic soprano; music teacher
- Years active: 1922–1977
- Spouse: Zygmunt Mackevic (m. 1935)

Olga Józefowicz (24 June 1904 – 31 January 1979), known professionally as Olga Olgina, was a Polish coloratura soprano, teacher and pianist. She made her debut in the title role of Verdi's La traviata at the Vilnius Opera in 1922 at age 18 and retired in 1977. She taught at the Łódź Conservatory, becoming dean of the institution. Teresa Żylis-Gara was one of her students.

== Early life and education ==
Olga Józefowicz was born on 24 June 1904 into a wealthy family in Yaroslavl, Russian Empire, and raised in Saint Petersburg. Her father, general Feliks Józefowicz (Russian: Феликс Юзефович), was Polish and served in the Russian Imperial Army, while her mother, Olga, was a Russian opera singer who performed under the pseudonym Olga Olgina. At the age of 6, she began playing the piano and aged 16 she was taught to sing by her mother. She attended the piano classes of Felix Blumenfeld, Drozdov, and Lavrov at Saint Petersburg Conservatory, and graduated in 1920. The same year, she began living with her mother in Vilnius.

== Career ==
On 1 December 1922, she made her debut in the title role of Verdi's La traviata under the pseudonym Irene Larar. From the age of 18, still using the Larar pseudonym, she sang at the Vilnius Opera, performing roles including Rosina in Rossini's The Barber of Seville, Gilda in Verdi's Rigoletto and Oscar in Un ballo in maschera. Between 1925 and 1926, she undertook her first tour of Austria and Yugoslavia, where she performed leading soprano roles and received positive reviews. After the tour, she was offered a position at the Oper Breslau, but was convinced by Emil Młynarski to decline the offer. Around this time she began performing under her mother's pseudonym, Olga Olgina, using this for the remainder of her life. After performing as a guest in Katowice for the 1926/1927 season, she made her debut in March 1927, again in La traviata, at the Grand Theatre in Warsaw. She officially became a soloist later that year and worked there until 1928, before returning for the 1932/33 season. A recording of Olgina singing "Ah! Fors' é lui" from La traviata was later recorded by Decca Records by 1931. After Młynarski's death, Olgina moved to the Polish city Poznań, where she worked as a soloist.

Olgina performed in various countries within Europe; during one tour in the United Kingdom, Olgina recorded an album with Decca Records.

On 30 December 1936, Olgina married cavalry captain Zygmunt Mackevic and afterwards semi-retired from the stage, living with her husband in a small town near Vilnius, and only gave occasional performances. Following the outbreak of World War II and the mobilisation of her husband, Olgina returned to Vilnius and performed at the Lutnia Theatre in autumn 1939. After that she began work at the music conservatory there. After the German invasion of Lithuania, the conservatory closed and Olgina began hosting musical evenings at her home. To support herself financially, she sold her personal belongings and gave private music tuitions. Olgina also helped the Home Army resistance movement, and later received an award for her support of them. When the Soviets entered Vilnius in 1944, the conservatory re-opened and Olgina resumed working there.

In 1945, Olgina moved to Łódź for a teaching position at Ludowy Instytut Muzyczny. On 9 March 1947, she performed her last solo concert in Łódź. From then, she focused exclusively on her teaching career, and began a singing class at the Łódź Conservatory. Teresa Żylis-Gara was one of her students. In 1960, Olgina became dean of the vocal faculty there and later became dean of the acting faculty from 1969. She worked in these roles until 1972.

== Later life ==
On 1 October 1977, Olgina retired. Two months later, on 29 December, she celebrated the 55th anniversary of her career at the Grand Theatre in Łódź.

Olgina died in Łódź on 31 January 1979, at the age of 74.
