= Georg Christian Lehms =

German writer (1684–1717)

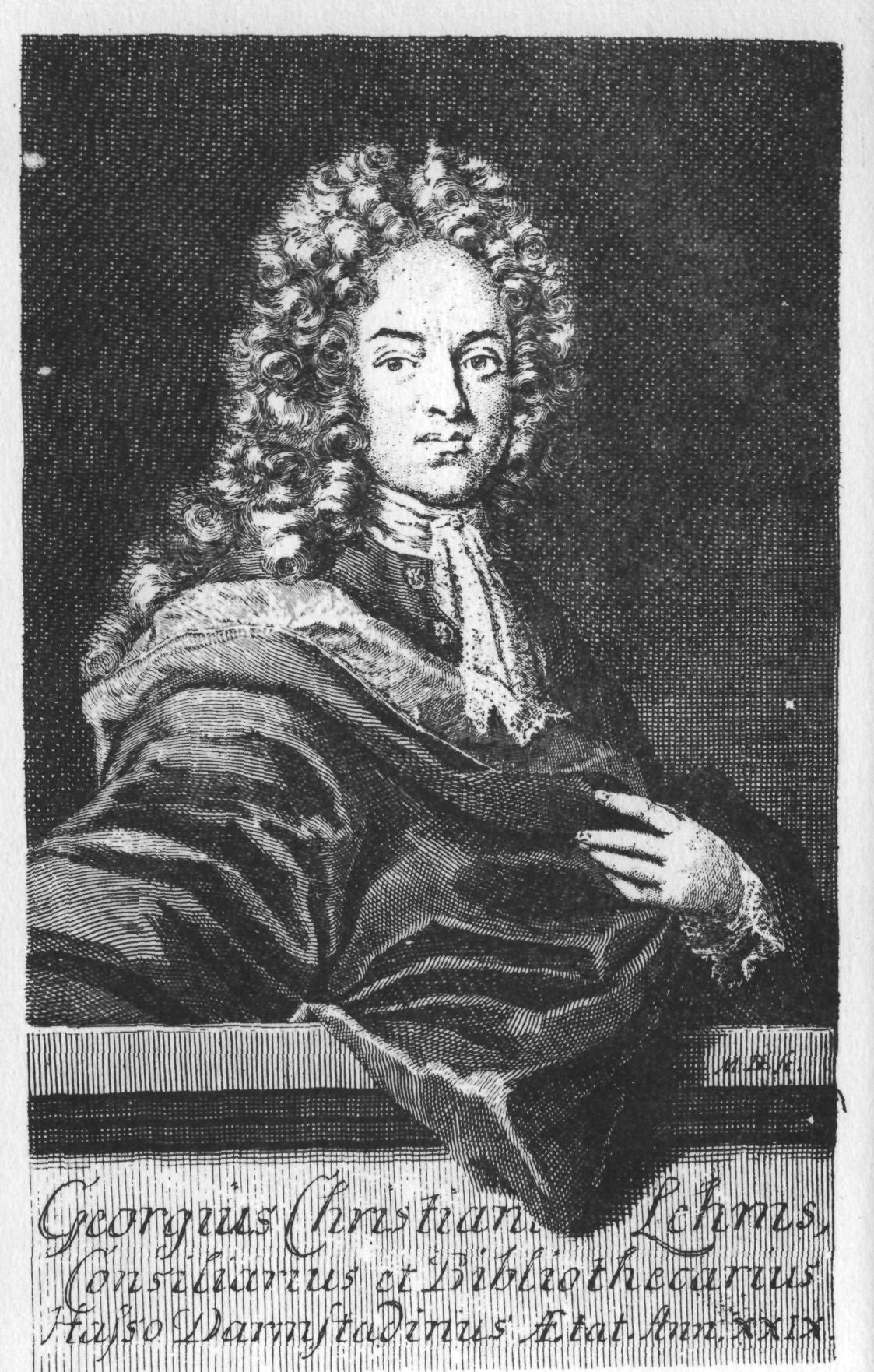
- Georg Christian Lehms, copper engraving c. 1713
- Born: 1684; Liegnitz
- Died: 15 May 1717; Darmstadt
- Occupations: Poet; Novelist
- Organizations: Landgraviate of Hesse-Darmstadt
- Known for: librettos for Johann Sebastian Bach

Georg Christian Lehms (German: [leːms]; 1684 – 15 May 1717) was a German poet and novelist who sometimes used the pen-name Pallidor. He published poetry, novels, libretti for operas, and the texts of cantatas.

== Life ==
Born in Liegnitz (now in Poland) in 1684, Lehms attended the Gymnasium (secondary school) in Görlitz and later studied at the University of Leipzig.

After spending some time at the court of Johann Georg, Duke of Saxe-Weissenfels, at the end of 1710 Lehms gained a position as court librarian and poet in Darmstadt, capital of the Landgraviate of Hesse-Darmstadt, where by 1713 he had been appointed to the Prince's council.

Lehms died of tuberculosis on 15 May 1717, aged about thirty-three.

== Works ==
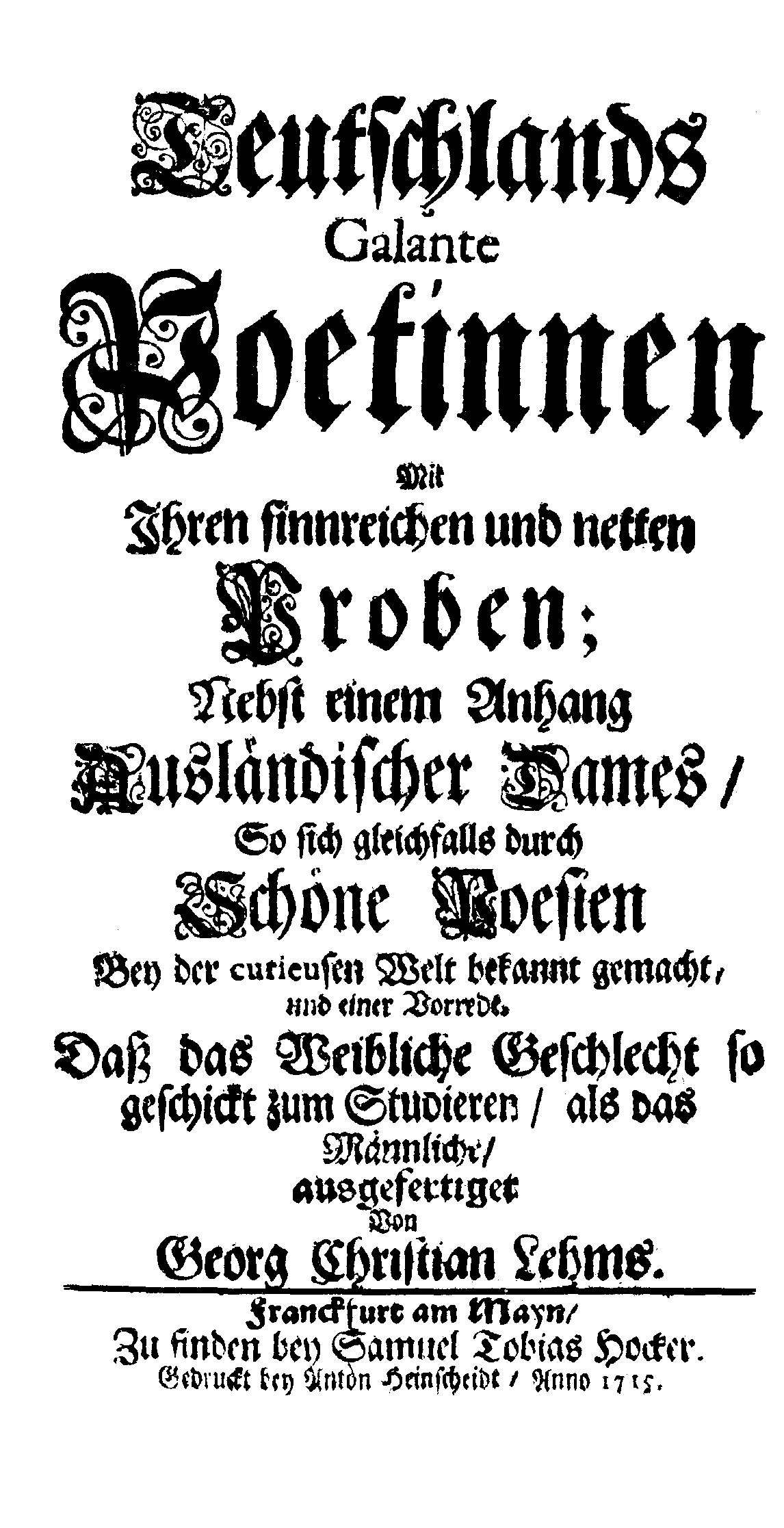
Teutschlands Galante Poetinnen, title page

Lehms's "gallant" novels (a term referring to fiction aimed at readers of both sexes) were among the earliest of such productions in German literature and began to appear early in his career under the pen-name of Pallidor. The first of these was Die unglückselige Princessin Michal und der verfolgte David ('The hapless Princess Michal and David pursued'), published in Hanover in 1707, followed in 1710 by Des israelitischen Printzens Absolons und seiner Prinzcessin Schwester Thamar Staats- Lebens- und Helden-Geschichte ('The Heroic Life and History of the Israelite Prince Absolom and his Princess Sister Tamar'), published by Zieger in Nuremberg; in 1712 the series continued with Der weise König Salomo ('Wise King Solomon').

Lehms made his name with the collection Teutschlands Galante Poetinnen (Germany's Gallant Poetesses).

The title page of Teutschlands Galante Poetinnen sums up the work thus:

Germany's Gallant Poetesses / with Ingenious and Pleasant Samples therefrom; together with an Appendix of those Ladies of Foreign Lands / who likewise made Themselves known to the Interest of the World by the Beauty of their Poetry, and a Preface. Demonstrating that the Female Gender has no less Skill for Studying / than the Male / Performed by Georg Christian Lehms, Franckfurt am Mayn / To be had from Samuel Tobias Hocker. Printed by Anton Heinscheidt. Anno 1715.

Lehms wrote libretti for operas and cantatas. The cantatas, while being religious works performed as part of the Lutheran services of the Darmstadt court, can be seen as influenced by secular poetry like the cantatas of Neumeister. They were set to music by Christoph Graupner, the Kapellmeister, and his assistant Gottfried Grünewald. The texts were published and it is assumed that Johann Sebastian Bach obtained a copy. While working at Weimar, Bach set words by Lehms for his first two solo cantatas. He avoided the poet's larger-scale work, going on to use the more intimate texts for another eight of his surviving cantatas. There is also evidence for a lost cantata (Cantata BWV Anh. 209) set to words by Lehms.

=== Selected works ===
- Die unglückselige Princessin Michal und der verfolgte David (The hapless Princess Michal and persecuted David) (Hanover: Nicolaus Förster, 1707)
- Des israelitischen Printzens Absolons und seiner Prinzcessin Schwester Thamar Staats- Lebens- und Helden-Geschichte (The Heroic Life and History of the Israelite Prince Absolom and of his Princess Sister Tamar)(Nuremberg: Zieger, 1710)
- Der weise König Salomo, in einer Staats- und Helden-Geschichte (The Royal and Heroic History of Wise King Solomon) (Hamburg & Leipzig: Johann von Wiering, 1712)
- Das singende Lob Gottes, in einem Jahrgang andächtiger und Gottgefälliger Kirch-Music (The Hymning of God, in an Annual Volume of devotional Church Music pleasing to God) (Darmstadt: Johann Georg John, 1712)
- Teutschlands Galante Poetinnen (Germany's Gallant Poetesses), in two parts, (Frankfurt am Main: Samuel Tobias Hocker, 1714–15; new editions at Darmstadt, Josef Gotthard Blaschke Verlag, 1966, and Leipzig, 1973)

=== Bach cantatas based on texts by Lehms ===
The table of cantatas which Bach set to music is sortable by time of first performance, occasion in the liturgical year, BWV catalogue, Incipit and translation of the incipit.

Cantatas set by Bach on texts by Lehms
Date	Occasion	BWV	Incipit	Translation
15 July 1714	Seventh Sunday after Trinity	54	Widerstehe doch der Sünde	Stand firm against sin
12 August 1714	Eleventh Sunday after Trinity	199	Mein Herze schwimmt im Blut	My heart swims in blood
25 December 1725	Christmas Day	110	Unser Mund sei voll Lachens	May our mouth be full of laughter
26 December 1725	Saint Stephen's Day	57	Selig ist der Mann	Blessed is the Man
27 December 1725	Third Day of Christmas	151	Süßer Trost, mein Jesus kömmt	Sweet comfort, my Jesus comes
1 January 1726	New Year's Day	16	Herr Gott, dich loben wir	Lord God, we praise You
13 January 1726	First Sunday after Epiphany	32	Liebster Jesu, mein Verlangen	Beloved Jesus, my desire
20 January 1726	Second Sunday after Epiphany	13	Meine Seufzer, meine Tränen	My sighs, my tears
28 July 1726	Sixth Sunday after Trinity	170	Vergnügte Ruh, beliebte Seelenlust	Delightful rest, beloved pleasure of the soul
8 September 1726	Twelfth Sunday after Trinity	35	Geist und Seele wird verwirret	Spirit and soul become confused
c.1714? 1725?	Seventh Sunday after Trinity	Anh. 209	Liebster Gott, vergißt Du mich	

== Sources ==
- E. Noack, "Georg Christian Lehms, ein Textdichter Johann Sebastian Bachs", in Bach-Jahrbuch 1970, pp. 7–18
- Liselotte Brögelmann: Studien zum Erzählstil im idealistischen Roman (Studies on the narrative style in the idealistic novel), Dissertation, University of Göttingen 1953 (typescript)
- Christiane Brokmann-Noorens: Weibliche Bildung im 18. Jahrhundert (The Education of Women in the 18th century), Dissertation, University of Oldenburg, 1992, ISBN 3-8142-0429-8
- Alfred Dürr: Die Kantaten von Johann Sebastian Bach (The cantatas of Johann Sebastian Bach), 6th Edition, Munich / Bärenreiter, Cassel, 1995
- Christoph Wolff (ed.): Die Welt der Bach-Kantaten (The World of the Bach cantatas), special edition in 3 vols., Metzler, Stuttgart / Bärenreiter, Cassel 2006, ISBN 3-476-02127-0 Metzler, Stuttgart / Bärenreiter, Kassel 2006, ISBN 3-476-02127-0
- Gerhard Dünnhaupt: "Georg Christian Lehms", in Personalbibliographien zu den Drucken des Barock, vol. 4., Stuttgart: Hiersemann 1991, pp. 2576–88. ISBN 3-7772-9122-6
