= Vergnügte Ruh, beliebte Seelenlust, BWV 170 =

Church cantata by Johann Sebastian Bach

Vergnügte Ruh, beliebte Seelenlust
- BWV 170
- Church cantata by J. S. Bach
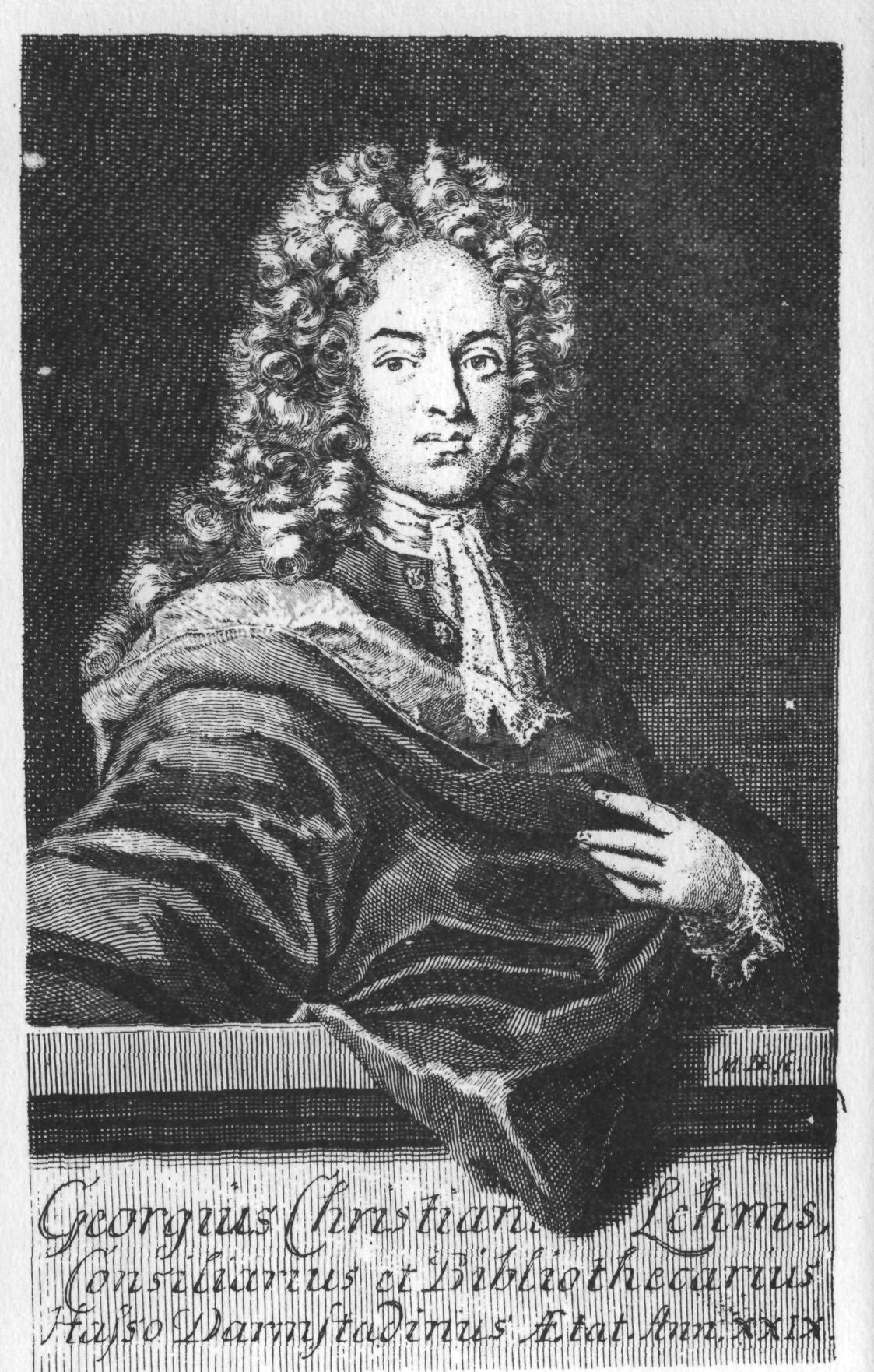
- Georg Christian Lehms, author of the text
- Occasion: Sixth Sunday after Trinity
- Cantata text: Georg Christian Lehms
- Performed: 28 July 1726: Leipzig
- Movements: 5
- Vocal: alto
- Instrumental: oboe d'amore; 2 violins; viola; organ; continuo

Johann Sebastian Bach composed Vergnügte Ruh, beliebte Seelenlust (Delightful rest, beloved pleasure of the soul), BWV 170, a church cantata for the sixth Sunday after Trinity in Leipzig. It is a solo cantata for alto that he first performed on 28 July 1726.

Due to circumstances during Bach's first years as Thomaskantor in Leipzig, the cantata became his first extant contribution for the occasion, as part of his third cantata cycle. He took the text from Georg Christian Lehms' 1711 collection Gottgefälliges Kirchen-Opfer, which paraphrases the prescribed Gospel from the Sermon on the Mount. He set it in five movements, alternating arias and recitatives. A small Baroque ensemble features oboe d'amore and an obbligato organ besides strings and basso continuo.

== History and words ==
Bach composed the cantata in Leipzig for the Sixth Sunday after Trinity. The prescribed readings for the Sunday are from the Epistle to the Romans, "By Christ's death we are dead for sin" (Romans 6:3–11), and from the Gospel of Matthew a passage from the Sermon on the Mount about better justice than the justice of merely observing laws and rules (Matthew 5:20–26). The text of the cantata is drawn from Georg Christian Lehms' Gottgefälliges Kirchen-Opfer (1711) and speaks of the desire to lead a virtuous life and so enter heaven and avoid hell.

Bach first performed the cantata on 28 July 1726. It is regarded as part of Bach's third cantata cycle. Its brevity, compared to the cantatas in two parts written before and after, such as Brich dem Hungrigen dein Brot, BWV 39, can be explained by assuming that in the same service another cantata Ich will meinen Geist in euch geben, JLB 7, by Johann Ludwig Bach was also performed.

Bach performed the cantata again around 1746. Bach's son Wilhelm Friedemann Bach performed the first movement around 1752 in Halle.

== Music ==
=== Structure and scoring ===
The cantata is one of three Bach cantatas written in Leipzig in the summer and autumn of 1726, in which an alto soloist is the only singer, the others being Geist und Seele wird verwirret, BWV 35, and Gott soll allein mein Herze haben, BWV 169. It seems likely that Bach had a capable alto singer at his disposal during this period.

Bach structured the cantata in five movements, alternating arias and recitatives. He scored the work for an alto soloist and a small ensemble of oboe d'amore (Oa), two violins (Vl), viola (Va), obbligato organ (Org) and basso continuo (BC). Alfred Dürr gave the duration of the cantata as 24 minutes in his book Die Kantaten von Johann Sebastian Bach.

In the following table of the movements, the scoring follows the Neue Bach-Ausgabe. The keys and time signatures are taken from Dürr, using the symbol for common time (4/4).

Movements of Vergnügte Ruh, beliebte Seelenlust
No.	Title	Text	Type	Vocal	Winds	Strings	continuo	Key	Time
1	Vergnügte Ruh, beliebte Seelenlust	Lehms	Aria	A	Oa	2Vl Va	BC	D major	12/8
2	Die Welt, das Sündenhaus	Lehms	Recitative	A			BC		common time
3	Wie jammern mich doch die verkehrten Herzen	Lehms	Aria	A	Org	2Vl Va (unis.)		F-sharp minor	common time
4	Wer sollte sich demnach wohl hier zu leben wünschen	Lehms	Recitative	A		2Vl Va	BC	D major	common time
5	Mir ekelt mehr zu leben	Lehms	Aria	A	Org Oa	2Vl Va	BC	D major	common time

=== Movements ===
==== 1 ====
The first aria, "Vergnügte Ruh, beliebte Seelenlust" (Delightful rest, beloved pleasure of the soul), is a da capo aria in a pastoral rhythm. The musicologist Julian Mincham notes: "The first stanza is enigmatically poetic and its essence is an evocation of that peace and inner contentment". The Bach scholar Alfred Dürr describes the mood as contemplative, and the melody of the voice as expansive, on a background of repeated quavers in the instruments.

==== 2 ====
The first recitative, "Die Welt, das Sündenhaus, bricht nur in Höllenlieder aus" (The world, that house of sin, erupts only in hellish songs), is secco, only accompanied by the continuo. John Eliot Gardiner, who conducted the Bach Cantata Pilgrimage in 2000, describes the librettist as a "vigorous and impassioned wordsmith" who uses Baroque language to paraphrase the Gospel reading, and he credits Bach with following the "declamatory gesture and expressive nuance".

==== 3 ====
The second aria, "Wie jammern mich doch die verkehrten Herzen, die dir, mein Gott, so sehr zuwider sein" (How the perverted hearts afflict me, which are so sorely, my God, set against you), is set without continuo, rare in Bach's compositions, and symbolic of the lack of direction in the lives of those who ignore the word of God. The organ plays the upper parts, while the violins and viola in unison form the lowest part. Gardiner notes that the two organ lines intertwine in fugal chromaticism for most of the aria, but turn to diatonic music for the mentioning of "Rach und Hass'" (revenge and hate) in the A section and "frech verlacht" (boldly flout) in the B section.

==== 4 ====
The second recitative, "Wer sollte sich demnach wohl hier zu leben wünschen" (Who should hereafter wish, indeed, to live here), is accompanied by the strings and continuo. The strings play mostly long chords but illustrate the words "bei Gott zu leben, der selbst die Liebe heißt" (to live with God, whose name is love) by more lively movement.

==== 5 ====
The final aria, "Mir ekelt mehr zu leben, drum nimm mich, Jesu, hin!" (It sickens me to live longer, therefore take me away, Jesus!), is a triumphant song about turning away from the world and desiring heaven. The words "Mir ekelt" (I feel revulsion) are expressed by an unusual tritone opening the melody. The voice is ornamented by figuration in the organ, which Bach set for flauto traverso for a performance in his last years.

== Manuscripts and publication ==
The manuscripts of both the score and parts survive. There is no extra part for the organ in the set of parts.

The first critical edition of the cantata, edited by Franz Wüllner, was published by the Bach Gesellschaft in 1886 as part of its complete edition of Bach's works. In the Neue Bach-Ausgabe, the second edition of Bach's works, the cantata was published in 1993, edited by Reinmar Emans.

Carus published a critical edition in German and English as part of its Stuttgarter Bach-Ausgaben in 2011, edited by Daniela Wissemann. In the 21st century, Bach Digital published high-resolution facsimile images of the manuscript parts from the first quarter of the 18th century.

== Recordings ==
The selection is taken from the listing provided by Bach Cantatas Website. Notable singers in the alto range recorded the cantata, male (as in Bach's time, also called altus or countertenor) and female (contralto or mezzo-soprano), including Maureen Forrester, Aafje Heynis, Jochen Kowalski, and Guillemette Laurens. Reviewer John Greene wrote about a 1966 recording with Janet Baker and the Academy of St Martin in the Fields that it had still much to offer 40 years later, and that the singer "breezed" through the work. A reviewer of Gramophone, who noted that Bach expressed a "restful and contemplative nature" when writing for an alto voice, preferred Monica Groop's rendition, although he missed "warmth of sentiment and rhetorical engagement" in the cantata's opening movement, to Nathalie Stutzmann whose voice he described as "supremely well-controlled" but showing too little emotion. He was more impressed by two countertenors who gave the music "light and shade, and distinctive musical personality", Alfred Deller and Andreas Scholl.

In the following table, ensembles playing on period instruments in historically informed performance are marked by a green background under the header Instr.

Recordings of Vergnügte Ruh, beliebte Seelenlust
Title	Conductor / Choir / Orchestra	Soloists	Label	Year	Instr.
J. S. Bach: Cantatas BWV 170 & BWV 189	Fritz Lehmann Bavarian State Orchestra	Elisabeth Höngen	Deutsche Grammophon	1951	
Alfred Deller Edition 7	Gustav Leonhardt Leonhardt Baroque Ensemble	Alfred Deller	Vanguard	1954	
J. S. Bach: Cantatas – Kantaten	Neville Marriner Academy of St Martin in the Fields	Janet Baker	Decca	1966	
J.S. Bach: Cantatas BWV 161, 170 & 177	Hans-Martin Linde Linde Consort	René Jacobs	Virgin Veritas	1980	
Die Bach Kantate Vol. 42	Helmuth Rilling Bach-Collegium Stuttgart	Julia Hamari	Hänssler	1982	
J. S. Bach: Das Kantatenwerk Vol. 40	Gustav Leonhardt Leonhardt Consort	Paul Esswood	Teldec	1985	Period
Bach: Alto Cantatas	Juha Kangas Ostrobothnian Chamber Orchestra	Monica Groop	Finlandia Records	1998	Period
Bach Edition Vol. 4 - Cantatas Vol. 1	Pieter Jan Leusink Netherlands Bach Collegium	Sytse Buwalda	Brillant Classics	1999	Period
Bach Cantatas Vol. 4: Ansbach/Haddinton	John Eliot Gardiner English Baroque Soloists	Michael Chance	Soli Deo Gloria	2000	Period
J. S. Bach: Complete Cantatas Vol. 16	Ton Koopman Amsterdam Baroque Orchestra	Bogna Bartosz	Antoine Marchand	2003	Period
Lamento	Reinhard Goebel Musica Antiqua Köln	Magdalena Kožená	Archiv Produktion	2005	Period
J. S. Bach Cantatas Vol. 37	Masaaki Suzuki Bach Collegium Japan	Robin Blaze	BIS	2005	Period
J.S. Bach: Kantate BWV 170 "Vergnügte Ruh, beliebte Seelenlust"	Rudolf Lutz Orchestra of the J. S. Bach-Stiftung	Andreas Scholl	J. S. Bach-Stiftung	2013	Period
Vergnügte Ruh, beliebte Seelenlust - Cantata, BWV 170	Jos van Veldhoven Nederlandse Bachvereniging	Alex Potter	All of Bach	2016	Period
