= Gott soll allein mein Herze haben, BWV 169 =

Church cantata by Johann Sebastian Bach for solo alto

Gott soll allein mein Herze haben
- BWV 169
- Solo church cantata by J. S. Bach
- First page of the manuscript of the alto part
- Occasion: 18th Sunday after Trinity
- Cantata text: Christoph Birkmann
- Chorale: Nun bitten wir den Heiligen Geist
- Performed: 20 October 1726: Leipzig
- Movements: 7
- Vocal: alto; SATB choir
- Instrumental: 2 oboes; taille; organ; 2 violins; viola; continuo

Johann Sebastian Bach composed the church cantata Gott soll allein mein Herze haben (God alone shall have my heart), BWV 169, a solo cantata for an alto soloist, in Leipzig for the 18th Sunday after Trinity and first performed it on 20 October 1726.

The text was written by Christoph Birkmann, a student of mathematics and theology in Leipzig who collaborated with Bach. He based it on the prescribed Gospel for the Sunday, about the Great Commandment, to love God and your neighbour, which is summarised in the closing chorale taken from Luther "Nun bitten wir den Heiligen Geist".

The cantata is Bach's last of four for solo alto, composed in his fourth year in Leipzig and regarded as part of his third cantata cycle. It incorporates two movements, the opening Sinfonia and an aria, from a lost concerto, here set for an obbligato organ which plays a decisive role among a Baroque instrumental ensemble of three oboes, strings and basso continuo. Bach structured the work in seven movements. The first line is repeated in several movements and within them, like a motto. Bach composed the famous cantata for bass solo, Ich will den Kreuzstab gerne tragen, BWV 56, to a text by the same author and also closed by a chorale, for a week later.

== History and words ==
Bach wrote the cantata during his fourth year as Thomaskantor in Leipzig, for the 18th Sunday after Trinity. The prescribed readings for the Sunday were from the First Epistle to the Corinthians, Paul's thanks for grace of God in Ephesus (1 Corinthians 1:4–8), and from the Gospel of Matthew, the Great Commandment (Matthew 22:34–46).

Until 2015 the librettist was unknown (as for most of Bach's Leipzig cantatas), but in that year researcher Christine Blanken from the Bach Archive published findings suggesting that Christoph Birkmann wrote the text of both Ich geh und suce mit Verlangen and Ich will den Kreuzstab gerne tragen. Birkmann was a student of mathematics and theology at the University of Leipzig from 1724 to 1727. During that time, he also studied with Bach and took part in cantata performances. He published a yearbook of cantata texts in 1728, Gott-geheiligte Sabbaths-Zehnden (Sabbath Tithes Devoted to God), which contains several Bach cantatas. Birkmann concentrated on the love of God in movements 2 to 5 and added one movement about the love of your neighbour in movement 6, continued in the concluding chorale, the third stanza of Martin Luther's hymn "Nun bitten wir den Heiligen Geist". The poet connected the first recitative to the following aria by beginning the two thoughts in the recitative with a related line from the aria as a motto, and ending both with a recapitulation of the first line. The second recitative is a paraphrase of 2 Kings 2:1, Elijah lifted to heaven. The second aria is a paraphrase of 1 John 2:15–16, which sets the love of God apart from the love of the world.

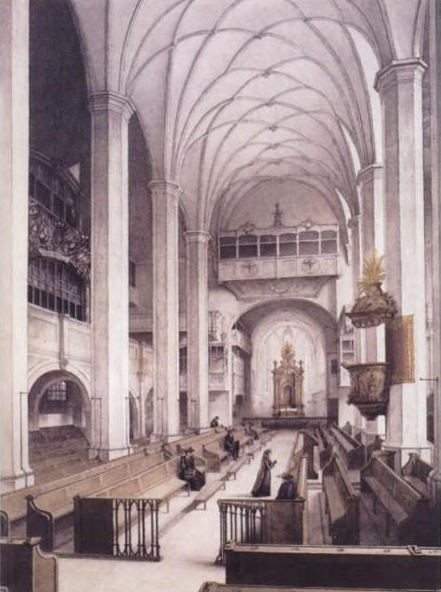
Depiction of the Thomaskirche in Leipzig, 19th century

The only other extant cantata for the Sunday is the chorale cantata Herr Christ, der einge Gottessohn, BWV 96, composed in 1724. Like three other cantatas, the early Widerstehe doch der Sünde, BWV 54 (1714), and the 1726 works Geist und Seele wird verwirret, BWV 35, and Vergnügte Ruh, beliebte Seelenlust, BWV 170, Bach wrote Gott soll allein mein Herze haben for a single alto soloist, but unlike those works a choir sings the chorale. The three later cantatas, written within a few months, employ the organ as an obbligato instrument, possibly because Bach liked the combination of alto voice and organ registrations. For the following Sunday, Bach composed the famous cantata for bass solo, Ich will den Kreuzstab gerne tragen, BWV 56, also concluded by a chorale. It is not known if Bach looked for texts suitable for a solo voice, or if texts were "clerically imposed on him", which stressed individual piety and therefore suggested to be treated as solo cantatas.

Bach first performed the cantata at the Thomaskirche in Leipzig on 20 October 1726. It is regarded as part of his third annual cycle of cantatas.

== Music ==
=== Structure and scoring ===
Bach structured the cantata in seven movements and scored it for an alto soloist, a four-part choir only in the closing chorale, and a Baroque instrumental ensemble of two oboes (Ob), taille (Ta), two violins (Vl), viola (Va), organ (Org) and basso continuo. The obbligato organ plays a dominant role, as also in other cantatas at the time.

In the following table, the scoring is based on the Neue Bach-Ausgabe. The keys and time signatures are taken from the Bach scholar Alfred Dürr's book Die Kantaten von Johann Sebastian Bach, using the symbol for common time (4/4). The continuo, playing throughout, is not listed.

Movements of Gott soll allein mein Herze haben
No.	Title	Text	Type	Vocal	Winds	Strings	Organ	Key	Time
1			Sinfonia		2Ob Ta	2Vl Va	Org	D major	common time
2	Gott soll allein mein Herze haben	Birkmann	Arioso	A					/ 3/8
3	Gott soll allein mein Herze haben	Birkmann	Aria	A			Org	D major	common time
4	Was ist die Liebe Gottes	Birkmann	Recitative	A					common time
5	Stirb in mir, Welt, und alle deine Liebe	Birkmann	Aria	A		2Vl Va	Org	B minor	12/8
6	Doch meint es auch dabei	Birkmann	Recitative	A					common time
7	Du süße Lieb, schenk uns deine Gunst	Luther	Chorale	SATB	2Ob Ta	2Vl Va		A major	common time

=== Movements ===
==== 1 ====
As in a number of other works, Bach reused some of his earlier works. The first movement, a sinfonia, and movement 5 rely on a lost concerto, perhaps for oboe or flute, possibly written during his time in Köthen (1717–23). That same concerto is the source of Bach's Harpsichord Concerto BWV 1053, composed around 1739. According to John Eliot Gardiner, it may have also served as an organ concerto for the new Silbermann organ in Dresden's Sophienkirche in 1725. Bach used the first movement of the concerto, in da capo form, as an extended instrumental introduction, assigning the solo part to the organ, the tutti to the strings and three oboes which he added for the cantata.

==== 2 ====
The first vocal movement is an arioso, "Gott soll allein mein Herze haben" (God alone shall have my heart), accompanied only by the continuo. Bach followed the careful wording of the poet by setting the lines from the following aria as a motto and conclusion of each thought as an arioso, the reflection which they frame as a secco recitative. The repeat of the essential line "Gott soll allein mein Herze haben" "acts like a rondo motif", according to Gardiner.

==== 3 ====
In the aria, again "Gott soll allein mein Herze haben" (God alone shall have my heart), the essential line appears reminiscent of the arioso, but in reverse movement. Gardiner states: "It is a perfect example of Bach's skill in following admonitions by contemporary music theorists to 'grasp the sense of the text' (Mauritius Vogt, 1719) with the goal of 'refined and text-related musical expression ... the true purpose of music' (Johann David Heinichen, 1711)." The accompaniment of the virtuoso organ adds weight to the statement. Musicologist Julian Mincham interprets the "richly embroidered organ melody", which continues throughout the movement, as a "virtually continuous stream of goodness".

==== 4 ====
A secco recitative, "Was ist die Liebe Gottes?" (What is the love of God?), reflects the love of God.

==== 5 ====
The music for the second aria, "Stirb in mir, Welt und alle deine Liebe" (Die in me, world and all your love), is again, like the Sinfonia, taken from the same concerto, with the voice woven into the solo organ and the strings. The text marks a farewell to love in the world. According to Dürr, the aria is an example of "how a piece can gain rather than lose from its adaptation in the context of a new work". The music of the aria, marked "siciliano" like the slow movement of the concerto, has been regarded as a "farewell to worldly life", in "a mood of heart-stopping intensity", also as a mystic contemplation of a heavenly love. It has been compared to the Agnus Dei from Bach's Mass in B minor, and also to the aria of the repenting Peter, "Erbarme dich" from Bach's St Matthew Passion.

==== 6 ====
After the love of God has been expanded in great detail in five movements, the commandment to also love one's neighbour is expressed in a short secco recitative, "Doch meint es auch dabei mit eurem Nächsten treu!" (Yet also keep in mind to be faithful to your neighbor!).

==== 7 ====
The closing chorale reaffirms the Great Commandment in the words from Luther's hymn "Du süße Lieb, schenk uns deine Gunst" (O sweet love, bestow your favor on us), asking the Holy Spirit, addressed as "sweet love", to assist in doing so: "so that we might love each other from our hearts and remain of one mind in peace".

== Manuscripts and publication ==
The manuscripts of both the score and the parts of Gott soll allein mein Herze haben survive, possibly revised by Bach. There is no extant extra part for the organ in the set of parts. Ulrich Bartels, who edited a critical edition, assumes that Bach would have played from the score, so there was no need to copy the organ part.

The first critical edition of the cantata, edited by Fritz Wüllner, was published by the Bach Gesellschaft in 1860 as part of its complete edition of Bach's works. In the Neue Bach-Ausgabe, the second edition of Bach's works, the cantata was published in 1990, edited by Matthias Wendt.

Carus published a critical edition in German and English as part of its Stuttgarter Bach-Ausgaben in 2016, edited by Bartels. In the 21st century, Bach Digital published high-resolution facsimile images of the manuscript parts from the first quarter of the 18th century.

== Recordings ==
As a solo cantata, the work has attracted many conductors and singers who are not specialists in Baroque music to record it. The following table is a selection from the Bach Cantatas website, where 57 recordings are listed as of 2026. Instrumental groups playing period instruments in historically informed performances are marked by green background under the header "Instr.".

Recordings of Gott soll allein mein Herze haben
Title	Conductor / Choir / Orchestra	Soloists	Label	Year	Instr.
J. S. Bach: Cantata No. 169, "Gott soll allein mein Herze haben"	Anthon van der Horst Nederlandse Bachvereniging	Aafje Heynis	Epic	1958	
J. S. Bach: Cantatas BWV 157 & BWV 169	Diethard Hellmann Kantorei der Christuskirche Mainz Kammerorchester der Christuskirche	Lotte Wolf-Matthäus	Cantate	1960	
Maureen Forrester sings Bach & Handel	Antonio Janigro I Solisti di Zagreb	Maureen Forrester	Vanguard	1964	
J. S. Bach & Handel: Solo Cantatas & Vocal Works	Yehudi Menuhin Bath Festival Orchestra	Janet Baker	EMI	1966	
J. S. Bach: Cantates BWV 161 & BWV 169	Frigyes Sándor Chamber Choir of the Franz Liszt Academy of Music Orchestra of the Franz Liszt Academy of Music	Julia Hamari	Hungaroton	1966	
Die Bach Kantate Vol. 53	Helmuth Rilling Gächinger Kantorei Bach-Collegium Stuttgart	Carolyn Watkinson	Hänssler	1983	
J. S. Bach: Das Kantatenwerk • Complete Cantatas • Les Cantates, Folge / Vol. 9	Nikolaus Harnoncourt Tölzer Knabenchor Concentus Musicus Wien	Paul Esswood	Teldec	1987	Period
Bach Kantaten BWV 35, BWV 169, BWV 49 (Sinfonia)	Hartmut Haenchen RIAS Kammerchor Kammerorchester Carl Philipp Emanuel Bach	Jochen Kowalski	Teldec	1994	Period
Bach Edition Vol. 9 – Cantatas Vol. 4	Pieter Jan Leusink Holland Boys Choir Netherlands Bach Collegium	Sytse Buwalda	Brilliant Classics	1999	Period
Bach Cantatas Vol. 9	John Eliot Gardiner Monteverdi Choir English Baroque Soloists	Nathalie Stutzmann	Soli Deo Gloria	2000	Period
J. S. Bach: Complete Cantatas Vol. 17	Ton Koopman Amsterdam Baroque Orchestra & Choir	Bogna Bartosz	Antoine Marchand	2002	Period
J. S. Bach: Cantatas Vol. 37	Masaaki Suzuki Bach Collegium Japan	Robin Blaze	BIS	2006	Period
J. S. Bach: Complete Cantatas Vol. 17	Julia Schröder Kammerorchester Basel	Andreas Scholl		2010	Period
J. S. Bach: Kantate BWV 169 "Gott soll allein mein Herze haben"	Rudolf Lutz Schola Seconda Pratica	Claude Eichenberger	Gallus Media	2008	Period

== Sources ==
- Gott soll allein mein Herze haben, BWV 169: Scores at the International Music Score Library Project
- BWV 169 Gott soll allein mein Herze haben English translation, University of Vermont
- BWV 169 Gott soll allein mein Herze haben text, scoring, University of Alberta
- Carol Traupman-Carr: Cantata BWV 169 Gott soll allein mein Herze haben analysis, Bach Choir of Bethlehem
- Luke Dahn: BWV 169.7 bach-chorales.com
