= Dominique Debart =

French conductor

Dominique Debart (born 9 September 1950 in Saint-Louis (Sénégal) ) is a French conductor, especially a choral conductor. He led the choir of the Opéra de Lyon from 1977 to 1983. He founded in 1982 the chamber orchestra L'Ensemble de Basse-Normandie and recorded with them a wide repertory from Bach's cantata Mein Herze schwimmt im Blut, BWV 199, to Steve Reich's The Desert Music.
