= Da capo aria =

Baroque musical form

The da capo aria (Italian pronunciation: [da (k)ˈkaːpo ˈaːrja]) is a musical form for arias that was prevalent in the Baroque era. It is sung by a soloist with the accompaniment of instruments, often a small orchestra. The da capo aria is very common in the musical genres of opera and oratorio. According to Randel, a number of Baroque composers (he lists A. Scarlatti, Hasse, Handel, Porpora, Leo, and Vinci) composed more than a thousand da capo arias during their careers.

== Form ==
A da capo aria is in ternary form, meaning it is composed of three sections. The first section is a complete song with accompaniment, ending in the tonic key, and could in principle be sung by itself. The second section contrasts with the first in its musical key, texture, mood, and sometimes also tempo. The third section was usually not written out by the composer, who would instead simply note the instruction "da capo" (Italian for "from the head") - meaning from the beginning, i.e., the first section is to be repeated.

The text for a da capo aria was typically a poem or other verse sequence written in two strophes, the first for the A section (hence repeated later) and the second for B. Each strophe consisted of from three to six lines, and terminated in a line containing a masculine ending, that is a line ending in a stressed syllable.

== Improvisation ==
The singer was often expected to improvise variations and ornaments during the third section, to keep it from being a mere repetition of the first. This was especially so for da capo arias written in slower tempos, where the opportunity to improvise, as well as the risk of dullness, were greater. The ability to improvise variations and ornaments was a skill learned by, and expected of, all solo singers. The decline in this ability following the Baroque era is perhaps the reason why the da capo aria ultimately acquired a reputation as a musically dull form. It also explains the tendency of performers (especially in Handel's Messiah) to perform truncated versions of the da capo aria; for example just the first section, or the first two sections followed by a truncated version of the third section.

The authentic performance movement, starting in the mid twentieth century, restored improvisation to the performance of da capo arias, although the practice has yet to become universal even among authentic performance artists.

== Famous examples ==
Handel's oratorio Messiah (1742) includes two well-known da capo arias, "He Was Despised" (for alto voice) and "The Trumpet Shall Sound" (for bass). J. S. Bach's cantata Jauchzet Gott in allen Landen, BWV 51 (1730) begins with a flamboyant da capo aria for soprano, trumpet soloist, and strings.
