= Jesu, meine Freude, BWV 227 =

Motet by Johann Sebastian Bach

Jesu, meine Freude
- BWV 227
- Motet by J. S. Bach
- Beginning of the first movement
- Key: E minor
- Bible text: Romans 8:1–2, 9–11
- Chorale: "Jesu, meine Freude"
- Movements: 11
- Vocal: SSATB
- Instrumental: Lost colla parte? (Note: Instruments play the same parts as the voices.)

Jesu, meine Freude (Jesus, my joy), BWV 227, is a motet by Johann Sebastian Bach. The longest and most musically complex of Bach's motets, it is set in eleven movements for up to five voices. It is named after the Lutheran hymn "Jesu, meine Freude" with words by Johann Franck, first published in 1653. The motet contains the six stanzas of the hymn in its odd-numbered movements. The hymn tune by Johann Crüger appears in all of these movements in different styles of chorale settings. The text of the motet's even-numbered movements is taken from the eighth chapter of the Epistle to the Romans, a passage that influenced key Lutheran teachings. The hymn, written in the first person with a focus on an emotional bond with Jesus, forms a contrasting expansion of the doctrinal biblical text. Bach set both texts alternating with and complementing each other, in a structure of symmetries on different layers.

Bach's treatment of Crüger's melody ranges from four-part chorale harmonisations that begin and end the work, to a chorale fantasia and a free setting that quotes only motifs of the hymn tune. Four biblical verses are set in the style of a motet, two for five voices and two for three voices. The central movement is a five-part fugue. Bach used word painting to intensify the theological meaning of both hymn and Epistle texts.

Jesu, meine Freude is one of few works by Bach for five vocal parts. The dating of the work is uncertain. It was supposed to have been written for a specific funeral in Leipzig in July 1723, a few months after Bach had moved there, as a scholar proposed in 1912. Since the 1990s, musicologists have come to doubt this, because the order of that funeral was found and shows no reference to music by Bach. At least one of the eleven movements seems to have been composed before Bach's tenure in Leipzig. The Bach scholar Christoph Wolff suggested that Bach may have composed and compiled the motet for the education of his choir in both composition techniques and theology. Chorale settings from the motet are included in the Dietel manuscript from around 1735, providing a latest dating of the work.

Unique in its complex symmetrical structure juxtaposing hymn and biblical texts, and with movements featuring a variety of styles and vocal textures, the motet has been regarded as one of Bach's greatest achievements in the genre. In 1927, it became the first of his motets to be recorded. The work has often been performed and recorded with a range of approaches, from unaccompanied singing to historically informed performances taking into account that in Bach's time it was customary to support the voices by basso continuo and instruments doubling the vocal lines (colla parte).

== History ==
=== Background ===
In late 17th-century Protestant Thuringia, members of the Bach family from the generations before Johann Sebastian Bach wrote motets, of which several are preserved in the Altbachisches Archiv (ABA). In this context, motets are choral compositions, mostly with a number of independent voices exceeding that of a standard SATB choir, and with German text from the Luther Bible and Lutheran hymns, sometimes in combination. When a hymn was used, usually its chorale tune was integrated into the composition. Instrumental accompaniment was often limited to basso continuo and/or instruments playing colla parte. By the time Bach started to compose his motets in the 1710s or 1720s along the principles of these older compositions, the genre was already regarded as antiquated. According to Philipp Spitta, Bach's 19th-century biographer, Johann Michael Bach's motet Halt, was du hast, ABA I, 10, which contains a setting of the "Jesu, meine Freude" chorale, may have been on Johann Sebastian's mind when he composed his motet named after the chorale, in E minor like his relative's.

In Bach's time, the Lutheran liturgical calendar of the place where he lived indicated the occasions for which music was required in church services. The bulk of the composer's sacred music, including most of his church cantatas, was written for such occasions. His other church music, such as sacred cantatas for weddings and funerals, and most of his motets, was not tied to the liturgical calendar. Around 15 extant compositions came to be recognised as Bach motets by musicologists at some time. Jesu, meine Freude is one of only five core works (BWV 225–229) which have always been considered to be Bach motets.

In eleven movements, Jesu, meine Freude is the longest and most musically complex of Bach's motets. It is scored for up to five vocal parts, which is rare among his works. Most of his vocal church music is to be performed with a four-part SATB choir, while most of his other motets are for double SATB choir. Exceptional compositions with five-part movements can be found in the Magnificat, written in 1723 at the beginning of Bach's tenure in Leipzig, and the Mass in B minor, compiled towards the end of his life. Like for most of his other motets, no continuo or other instrumental accompaniment has survived for BWV 227, but it is surmised there was one in Bach's time.

=== Epistle text and chorale ===
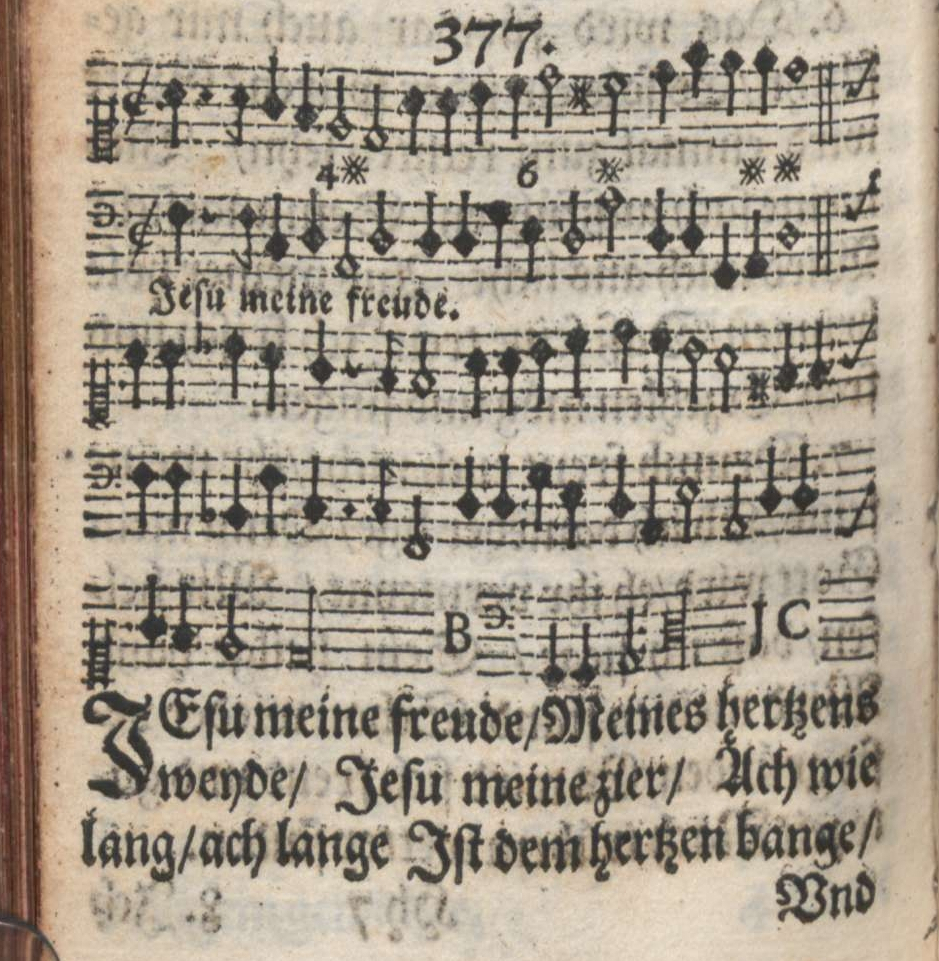
"Jesu, meine Freude", printed as No 377 in Praxis pietatis melica, 1653

The text of Jesu, meine Freude is compiled from two sources: a 1653 hymn of the same name with words by Johann Franck, and Bible verses from Paul's Epistle to the Romans, 8:1–2 and 9–11. In the motet, the six hymn stanzas form the odd movement numbers, while the even numbers each take one verse from the Epistle as their text. The hymn is written in the first person and deals with a believer's bond to Jesus who is addressed as a helper in physical and spiritual distress, and therefore a reason for joy. The singer realizes the world as vanity, and prefers to leave it. Franck used stark images such as "old dragon" and "death's jaw" to express the believer's enemies. The hymn adds a layer of individuality and emotions to Biblical teaching. When Catherine Winkworth translated the hymn into English in 1869, she rendered it as "Jesu, priceless treasure".

As a key teaching of the Lutheran faith, the Biblical text reflects on the contrast of living "in the flesh" or "according to the Spirit". The hymn's first line is also the last line of its final stanza, framing the poetry of the whole work.

Johann Crüger's chorale melody for the hymn, Zahn 8032, was first published in his hymnal Praxis pietatis melica of 1653; several variants of the hymn tune were published in other hymnals over the ensuing decades. The tune is in bar form (AAB). While the first version had dance elements of an Allemande, the version of the 1682 Neu Leipziger Gesangbuch, the hymnal used in Leipzig then, it is in common time. the melody is built from one motif, the beginning descent of a fifth (catabasis), with the word "Jesu" as the high note, which is immediately inverted (anabasis). In the Leipzig version, the melody of the first line is identical to that of the last line. The hymn tune appears in the odd-numbered movements of the motet, completely in the Leipzig version for most stanzas, but paraphrased for the third stanza, and in a slightly different older version in the fifth stanza.

=== Time of origin ===
Most of Bach's motets are difficult to date and Jesu, meine Freude is no exception. Spitta assigned the motets that he knew, including Jesu, meine Freude, to Bach's Leipzig years, 1723 to 1750. In 1912, Bernhard Friedrich Richter, a church musician in Leipzig, wrote that Jesu, meine Freude was likely written in Bach's first year as Thomaskantor in Leipzig; he concluded that it was written for the funeral of Johanna Maria Kees, the wife of the Leipzig postmaster, on 18 July 1723, because a scripture reading of verse 11 from the Epistle passage set in the motet's tenth movement was documented for the funeral. Daniel R. Melamed, a musicologist from Cambridge University, wrote in his 1995 book that this was not conclusive evidence for a motet performance on the occasion, but the date has still been "nearly universally accepted". The order of that particular service was found in 1982, mentioning neither a motet nor even the chorale. Possibly the idea of combining hymn and epistle text dates back to the funeral.

Friedrich Smend was the first musicologist to analyse the motet's symmetrical structure, a feature which can also be found in Bach's St John Passion of 1724 and St Matthew Passion of 1727, which led Smend to suggest that the work was composed in the 1720s. Melamed thought that the motet was likely in part compiled from music Bach had composed before his Leipzig period. He based that view on the four-part settings of the chorale movements 1, 7 and 11 (unusual for a five-part work), and on the older version of the chorale melody used as the cantus firmus in the ninth movement. The latter suggests an origin of this movement in Bach's Weimar period (1708 to 1717), or even earlier. John Eliot Gardiner, who conducted the Bach Cantata Pilgrimage, noted that the motet, compiled partly from earlier compositions, is comparable in that respect to the Credo from Bach's Mass in B minor, and both are coherent in performance.

Christoph Wolff, a Bach scholar, suggested in 2002 that the motet may have been intended for the education of the Thomanerchor rather than for a funeral. He assumed the same intended use for the motet Singet dem Herrn ein neues Lied, BWV 225. According to Bach scholar Richard D. P. Jones, several movements of Jesu, meine Freude show a style too advanced to have been written in 1723. He assumed in his 2013 book that the final arrangement of the work likely happened in the late 1720s, when two motets which can be dated with greater certainty were also written: Singet dem Herrn ein neues Lied and the funeral motet Der Geist hilft unser Schwachheit auf, BWV 226. The Dietel manuscript, written around 1735, contains three chorales extracted from the motet; the composition of the motet is supposed to have been completed before that time.

== Structure and scoring ==
Jesu, meine Freude is structured in eleven movements, with text alternating between a chorale stanza and a passage from the Epistle. Bach scored it for a choir of up to five voices (SSATB: one or two soprano parts (S or SS), alto (A), tenor (T) and B for bass). The number of voices in the movements varies from three to five. Only the alto sings in all movements. The motet was possibly meant to be accompanied by instruments playing colla parte, with instruments doubling the vocal lines in the practice of Bach's time, but no parts for them survived.

=== Table of the structure ===
The music is arranged in different layers of symmetry around the sixth movement. The first and last movements have the same four-part setting of the first and last stanzas of Franck's hymn. The second and penultimate movements use the same themes in fugal writing. The third and fifth movements, both five-part chorale settings, mirror the seventh and ninth movements, both four-part chorale settings. In great variety of chorale settings, the fifth movement is a free setting of the chorale stanza which quotes only motifs from the tune, and the ninth movement is a chorale fantasia, with the cantus firmus in the alto. The fourth and eighth movements are both trios, the fourth for the three highest voices (Note: two sopranos and alto), the other for the three lowest voices. (Note: alto, tenor and bass) The central movement (Romans 8:9) is a five-part fugue.

In the following table, each movement number is followed by the beginning of the text (incipit) and its translation into English, its text source naming the stanza in Franck's hymn or the verse(s) in Paul's Epistle, its voices, its key, its time signature, and its form. For the form, corresponding movements within the symmetry are shown at the same level of indentation.

Movements of Jesu, meine Freude
No.	Text	Text source	Voices	Key	Time	Form
1	Jesu, meine Freude (Jesus, my joy)	1st stanza	SATB	E minor	common time	chorale
2	Es ist nun nichts Verdammliches (There is therefore now no condemnation)	Romans 8:1	SSATB	E minor	3/2	· fugato
3	Unter deinen Schirmen (Under your protection)	2nd stanza	SSATB	E minor	common time	·· chorale
4	Denn das Gesetz (For the law [of the Spirit])	Romans 8:2	SSA	G major	3/4	··· trio
5	Trotz dem alten Drachen (I defy the old dragon)	3rd stanza	SSATB	E minor	3/4	···· free chorale
6	Ihr aber seid nicht fleischlich (But ye are not in the flesh)	Romans 8:9	SSATB	G major	common time	····· fugue
7	Weg, weg mit allen Schätzen (Away with all treasures!)	4th stanza	SATB	E minor	common time	···· chorale
8	So aber Christus in euch ist (And if Christ be in you)	Romans 8:10	ATB	C major	12/8	··· trio
9	Gute Nacht, o Wesen (Good night, existence)	5th stanza	SSAT	A minor	2/4	·· chorale fantasy
10	So nun der Geist (But if the Spirit)	Romans 8:11	SSATB	E minor	3/2	· fugato
11	Weicht, ihr Trauergeister (Go away, mournful spirits)	6th stanza	SATB	E minor	common time	chorale

=== Movements ===
==== 1 ====
The motet begins with a four-part setting of the first stanza of the hymn "Jesu, meine Freude" ("Jesus, my joy" or "Jesus, Source of gladness"). The first movement is in E minor, like most other movements related to the hymn. The text, in the first person, speaks of longing for Jesus. Jones noted that the tenor part is particularly expressive. The last movement, the chorale's sixth stanza, has the same music, creating a frame that encloses the whole work:

==== 2 ====
The second movement begins the excerpts from Romans 8, setting verse 1, "Es ist nun nichts Verdammliches an denen, die in Christo Jesu sind" (There is therefore now no condemnation to them which are in Christ Jesus). The difference between living in the flesh and the spirit is an aspect that is repeated throughout the motet. The movement is also in E minor, but for five voices.

The beginning of the text is rendered in "rhetorical" homophony: Bach accented the word "nichts" (nothing), repeating it twice, with long rests and echo dynamics. Jones noted that dramatic word painting of this kind was in the tradition of 17th-century motets, such as by Johann Christoph and Johann Michael Bach.

==== 3 ====
The third movement is a five-part setting of the second stanza of the hymn, "Unter deinen Schirmen" (Under your protection). While the first soprano provides the chorale melody, the lower voices supply vivid lines expressing the text.

==== 4 ====
The fourth movement sets the second verse from Romans 8, "Denn das Gesetz des Geistes, der da lebendig machet in Christo Jesu, hat mich frei gemacht von dem Gesetz der Sünde und des Todes" (For the law of the Spirit of life in Christ Jesus hath made me free from the law of sin and death.). The thought is set for the two sopranos and alto, beginning in G major. The sopranos move in "beatific" parallel thirds in the opening when singing of "life in Christ Jesus".

==== 5 ====
Beginning of the fifth movement, highlighting motifs from the chorale tune in the melody sung by the soprano

The fifth movement is a setting of the third stanza of the hymn, "Trotz dem alten Drachen" (Despite the old dragon). The defiant opposition, also to death, fear and the rage of the world, is expressed in a free composition. The soprano melody paraphrases the hymn tune by quoting short motifs from the chorale. The movement is in the bar form as the original melody. Five voices take part in a dramatic illustration as they depict defiance by standing firmly and singing, often in powerful unison. Gardiner compared the movement referring to the medieval image of the old dragon, to paintings by Cranach and Grünewald. The rhetoric style is similar to the beginning of the second movement. Gardiner noted that the firm stance against opposition could depict Martin Luther's attitude and also the composer's own stance, and summarises:

If one wanted to pick a single example of how Bach chose to harness his compositional prowess and capacity for invention to articulate his zeal and faith, this would be it.

==== 6 ====
The central sixth movement sets verse 9 from Romans 8, "Ihr aber seid nicht fleischlich, sondern geistlich" (But ye are not in the flesh, but in the Spirit). Again beginning in G major, the tenor starts with a fugue theme that stresses the word "geistlich" (of the Spirit) by a long melisma in the fast notes, while the opposite "fleischlich" is a long note stretched over the bar-line. The alto enters during the melisma. All five voices participate in a lively fugue, the only one within the motet. It is a double fugue, with a first theme for the first line, another for the second, "so anders Gottes Geist in euch wohnet" (since the Spirit of God lives otherwise in you), before both of them are combined in various ways, parallel and in stretti. By contrast, the third line of verse 9, "Wer aber Christi Geist nicht hat, der ist nicht sein" (Any one who does not have the spirit of Christ does not belong to him) is set in a homophonic adagio: "not of Christ".

==== 7 ====
The seventh movement is a four-part setting of the fourth stanza of the hymn, "Weg mit allen Schätzen" (Away with all treasures). While the soprano sings the chorale melody, the lower voices intensify the gesture; "weg" (away) is repeated several times in fast succession. Throughout the movement, the lower voices intensify the expressiveness of the text.

==== 8 ====
The eighth movement sets verse 10 from Romans 8, "So aber Christus in euch ist, so ist der Leib zwar tot um der Sünde willen" (And if Christ be in you, the body is dead because of sin). As in the fourth movement, it is set as a trio, this time for alto, tenor and bass, beginning in C major. Parallel thirds in the upper voices resemble those in the fourth movement.

==== 9 ====
The ninth movement is a setting of the fifth stanza of the hymn, "Gute Nacht, o Wesen, das die Welt erlesen" (Good night, existence that cherishes the world). For the rejection of everything earthly, Bach composed a chorale fantasia, with the cantus firmus in the alto voice and repetition of "Gute Nacht" in the two sopranos and the tenor. Jones pointed out that the absence of a bass may depict that "the world" lacks a firm foundation in Christ. The chorale melody used in the movement is slightly different from the one in the other settings within the motet, a version which Bach used mostly in his earlier time in Weimar and before. For Gardiner, the "sublime" music suggests the style of Bach's Weimar period. Jones, however, found that the "bewitchingly lyrical setting" matched compositions from the mid-1720s in Leipzig, comparing the music to the Sarabande from the Partita No. 3, BWV 827.

==== 10 ====
The tenth movement sets verse 11 from Romans 8, "So nun der Geist des, der Jesum von den Toten auferwecket hat, in euch wohnet" (But if the Spirit of him that raised up Jesus from the dead dwell in you). In symmetry, the music recalls that of the second movement.

==== 11 ====
The motet ends with the same four-part setting as the first movement, with the last stanza of the hymn as lyrics, "Weicht, ihr Trauergeister" (Flee, you mournful spirits). The final line repeats the beginning on the same melody: "Dennoch bleibst du auch im Leide, / Jesu, meine Freude" (You stay with me even in sorrow, / Jesus, my joy).

== Reception, performances and publication ==
Jesu, meine Freude is unique in Bach's work in its complex symmetrical structure, which juxtaposes hymn and Bible text. Bach's vivid setting of the contrasting texts results in music of an unusually dramatic range. Wolff summarised:

This diversified structure of five-, four-, and three-part movements, with shifting configurations of voices and a highly interpretive word-tone relationship throughout, wisely and sensibly combines choral exercise with theological education.

Performers of Jesu, meine Freude have to decide if they will use a boys' choir (as Bach had in mind) or a mixed choir, a small vocal ensemble or a larger choir, and if instruments should accompany the voices, a continuo group or also instruments playing colla parte.

=== 18th and 19th centuries ===
As with most of Bach's motets, there is no extant autograph of Jesu, meine Freude. The motet's SATB chorales were copied in several 18th-century manuscripts collecting chorale harmonisations by Bach. The earliest extant copy of such chorale collections, the Dietel manuscript, also contains a SATB version of the motet's five-part third movement: Dietel's copy omitted the second soprano part of the movement. Carl Philipp Emanuel Bach retained two chorales, based on the motet's first and seventh movements, in the third volume of Breitkopf's 1780s edition of Bach's four-part chorales.

After Bach's death, the motets, unlike much of his other music, were kept continuously in the repertoire of the Thomanerchor. A choral version of the entire motet, that is without any indication of instrumental accompaniment, was first published in 1803 in the second volume of Breitkopf & Härtel's first edition of six motets by (or at least, attributed to) Bach. Jesu, meine Freude was included in the first complete edition of the composer's works, the Bach-Gesellschaft Ausgabe (BGA); together with other motets it was edited by Franz Wüllner and was published in 1892 for volume 39 of the project.

=== 20th and 21st centuries ===
In the 1920s, the large Bach Choir in London performed Bach's works conducted by Ralph Vaughan Williams, while Charles Kennedy Scott performed Jesu, meine Freude with his Bach Cantata Club in chamber formation, which prompted a reviewer to write: "It would be absurd to forbid Bach's Motets to big choirs, but this performance left no doubt that the listener gets the truth of the music from voices few and picked." Scott and the Bach Cantata Club made the first recording of Jesu, meine Freude, which was the first of any motet by Bach, in 1927, sung in English. The optimum size of the choir in this work continues to be discussed to this day, for example in reviews of Philippe Herreweghe's one voice per part recordings of 1985 and 2010. Jesu, meine Freude has been recorded more than 60 times, mostly in combination with other motets by Bach. Sets with a recording of BWV 227 alongside other Bach motets include:

- Philippe Herreweghe with the Collegium Vocale Gent and La Chapelle Royale (recorded November 1985, released 1986)
- Harry Christophers with the Sixteen, 1989
- Masaaki Suzuki with the Bach Collegium Japan, using instruments playing colla parte, 2009
- Herreweghe, second set recorded in 2010
- Gardiner, whose second recording of the motets with the Monteverdi Choir in 2011 received a Gramophone Award in 2013 in the category Baroque Vocal.

The New Bach Edition (Neue Bach-Ausgabe, NBA) published the motet in 1965, edited by Konrad Ameln, with critical commentary published in 1967. In 1995, Bärenreiter published the vocal parts of the six motets BWV 225–230 from the NBA in one volume, with a preface by Klaus Hofmann. The motets were published by Carus-Verlag in 1975, edited by Günter Graulich, and published again in 2003, edited by Uwe Wolf, as part of the Stuttgarter Bach-Ausgaben, a complete edition of Bach's vocal works. Modern editions of the motet may supply a reconstructed instrumental accompaniment, such as a continuo realisation, and/or a singable translation of the lyrics, as for instance in Carus's 2003 publication of the motet.

== Notes and references ==
=== Cited sources ===
==== Bach Digital ====
- "D-B Mus.ms. 30199, Fascicle 14". Bach Digital. Leipzig: Bach Archive; et al. 31 January 2020.
- "Der Gerechte kömmt um BWV deest (BC C 8)". Bach Digital. Leipzig: Bach Archive; et al. 25 May 2019.
- "Jesu, meine Freude BWV 227". Bach Digital. Leipzig: Bach Archive; et al. 14 May 2019.
- "Jesu, meine Freude BWV 227/1". Bach Digital. Leipzig: Bach Archive; et al. 23 May 2019.
- "Jesu, meine Freude BWV 227/3". Bach Digital. Leipzig: Bach Archive; et al. 23 May 2019.
- "Jesu, meine Freude BWV 227/7". Bach Digital. Leipzig: Bach Archive; et al. 23 May 2019.

==== Books ====
- Ameln, Konrad (1965). Bach, Johann Sebastian / Jesu, meine Freude for Five-part Mixed Choir in E minor BWV 227. Bärenreiter. ISMN 979-0-00-649848-2. Archived from the original on 26 March 2020.
- Anderson, Nicholas (December 1986). "Bach Motets". Gramophone. Archived from the original on 6 May 2021.
- Dürr, Alfred; Kobayashi, Yoshitake, eds. (1998). Bach Werke Verzeichnis: Kleine Ausgabe – Nach der von Wolfgang Schmieder vorgelegten 2. Ausgabe [Bach Works Catalogue: Small Edition – After Wolfgang Schmieder's 2nd edition] (in German). Kirsten Beißwenger (collaborator) (BWV^{2a} ed.). Wiesbaden: Breitkopf & Härtel. ISBN 978-3-7651-0249-3. Preface in English and German.
- Dürr, Alfred; Jones, Richard D. P. (2006). "Introduction". The Cantatas of J. S. Bach with Their Librettos in German–English Parallel Text. Oxford University Press. pp. 23–24. ISBN 978-0-19-929776-4.
- Gardiner, John Eliot (2013). Music in the Castle of Heaven: A Portrait of Johann Sebastian Bach. Penguin UK. pp. 350–352. ISBN 978-1-84-614721-0.
- Graulich, Günter; Wolf, Uwe, eds. (2003). Johann Sebastian Bach: Jesu, meine Freude / Jesus, My Salvation – BWV 227 (PDF) (Urtext, full score). Stuttgarter Bach-Ausgaben (in German and English). Translated by Lunn, Jean. Continuo realisation by Horn, Paul. Carus. CV 31.227. Archived (PDF) from the original on 20 March 2020.
- Haskell, Harry (1996). The Early Music Revival: A History. Courier Corporation. p. 38. ISBN 978-0-48-629162-8.
- Hofmann, Klaus (1995). "Preface". J. S. Bach / Motetten / Motets. Bärenreiter. pp. VII–IX. ISMN 979-0-00-649848-2. Archived from the original on 26 March 2020.
- Jones, Richard D. P. (2013). The Creative Development of Johann Sebastian Bach, Volume II: 1717–1750: Music to Delight the Spirit. Oxford University Press. pp. 202–205. ISBN 978-0-19-969628-4.
- Melamed, Daniel R. (1995). "Chronology, Style, and Performance Practise of Bach's Motets". J. S. Bach and the German Motet. Cambridge University Press. pp. 98–106. ISBN 978-0-52-141864-5.
- Melamed, Daniel R. (2000). Graulich, Günter; Wolf, Uwe (eds.). Johann Sebastian Bach: Jesu, meine Freude / Jesus, My Salvation – BWV 227 / Postscript (PDF). Translated by Beste, Helga. Continuo realisation by Horn, Paul. Carus. p. 50. CV 31.227. Archived (PDF) from the original on 20 March 2020.
- Schicht, Johann Gottfried, ed. (1802–1803). Joh. Seb. Bach's Motetten in Partitur (in German). Vol. I (1802: BWV 225, 228, Anh. 159) – II (1803: BWV 229, 227, 226). Breitkopf und Härtel.
- Schneider, Max, ed. (1935). Altbachisches Archiv: aus Johann Sebastian Bachs Sammlung von Werken seiner Vorfahren Johann, Heinrich, Georg Christoph, Johann Michael u. Johann Christoph Bach [Old-Bachian Archive: From Johann Sebastian Bach's Collection of Works by His Forefathers Johann, Heinrich, Georg Christoph, Johann Michael and Johann Christoph Bach] (Reprint: 1966). Das Erbe deutscher Musik, Special volume 1 (in German). Vol. 1: Motetten und Chorlieder [Motets and choral songs]. Leipzig: Breitkopf & Härtel. GND 1001795741.
- Spitta, Philipp (1899). Johann Sebastian Bach: His Work and Influence on the Music of Germany, 1685–1750. Translated by Bell, Clara; Fuller Maitland, John Alexander. Novello & Co. Vol. I – Vol. II – Vol. III.
- Vopelius, Gottfried (1682). Neu Leipziger Gesangbuch [New Leipzig hymnal] (in German). Christoph Klinger.
- Wolf, Uwe (2002). "Zur Schichtschen Typendruck-Ausgabe der Motetten Johann Sebastian Bachs und zu ihrer Stellung in der Werküberlieferung" [On Schicht's movable font edition of the motets of Johann Sebastian Bach, and on its place in the work transmission]. Musikalische Quellen, Quellen zur Musikgeschichte: Festschrift für Martin Staehelin zum 65. Geburtstag [Musical sources, sources for the history of music: commemorative paper for Martin Staehelin's 65th birthday] (in German). Vandenhoeck & Ruprecht. pp. 269–286. ISBN 978-3-52-527820-8.
- Wolf, Uwe, ed. (2002). "Preface". Johann Sebastian Bach / Motetten / Motets (PDF) (Urtext, full score). Stuttgarter Bach-Ausgaben (in German and English). Translated by Coombs, John. Carus. CV 31.224.
- Wolff, Christoph (2002). Johann Sebastian Bach: The Learned Musician. Oxford University Press. pp. 249–250. ISBN 978-0-393-32256-9.
- Zahn, Johannes (1891). Die Melodien der deutschen evangelischen Kirchenlieder [The melodies of the German evangelical hymns] (in German). Vol. IV. Gütersloh: Bertelsmann. Vol. IV.

==== Journals ====
- Freeman-Attwood, Jonathan (August 2012). "Bach Motets BWV225-230". Gramophone. Archived from the original on 29 August 2020.
- Riley, Paul (20 January 2012). "Bach, JS: Motets BWV 225-230". BBC Music Magazine. Archived from the original on 8 May 2021.
- Schmidt, Eckart David (1 December 2011). "'Jesu, meine Freude'. Zu einer theologischen und pragmatischen Hermeneutik von Text und Musik in J. S. Bachs Motette BWV 227" ['Jesu, meine Freude': On a theological and practical hermeneutics of text and music of J. S. Bach's motet BWV 227]. International Journal of Practical Theology (in German). 15 (2). De Gruyter. doi:10.1515/IJPT.2011.034. S2CID 146854834. Archived from the original on 1 July 2018.
- Schulze, Hans-Joachim (1983). "'150 Stücke von den Bachischen Erben': Zur Überlieferung der vierstimmigen Choräle Johann Sebastian Bachs" ["150 pieces from the Bach estate": on the transmission of Johann Sebastian Bach's four-part chorales]. In Schulze, Hans-Joachim; Wolff, Christoph (eds.). Bach-Jahrbuch 1983 [Bach Yearbook 1983]. Bach-Jahrbuch (in German). Vol. 69. Neue Bachgesellschaft. Berlin: Evangelische Verlagsanstalt. pp. 81–100. doi:10.13141/bjb.v1983. ISSN 0084-7682. Archived from the original on 26 July 2020.
- Smith, Charlotte (25 September 2013). "Gramophone 2013 Baroque Vocal winner Sir John Eliot Gardiner discusses Bach Motets". Gramophone. Archived from the original on 3 December 2021.

==== Online sources ====
- Browne (January 2006). "Jesu, meine Freude / Text and Translation of Chorale". Bach Cantatas Website. Archived from the original on 30 January 2020.
- Cookson, Michael (May 2010). "Johann Sebastian Bach (1685–1750) / Motets". musicweb-international.com. Archived from the original on 20 March 2020.
- Dahn, Luke (2018). "BWV 227.1=227.11". bach-chorales.com. Archived from the original on 23 February 2020.
- Dahn, Luke (2018). "BWV 227.3". bach-chorales.com. Archived from the original on 23 February 2020.
- Dahn, Luke (2018). "BWV 227.7". bach-chorales.com. Archived from the original on 23 February 2020.
- Dellal, Pamela (2020). "BWV 227 – 'Jesu, meine Freude'". pameladellal.com. Archived from the original on 30 December 2021.
- Eckerson, Sara (2020). "On J. S. Bach's Sublime 'Gute Nacht' of Jesu, meine Freude (BWV 227)". Forma de Vida. Archived from the original on 19 March 2020.
- Elste, Martin (2000). "Die Motetten BWV 225–230 und 118" [The motets BWV 225–230 and 118]. Meilensteine der Bach-Interpretation 1750–2000 (in German). J. B. Metzler. pp. 176–179. doi:10.1007/978-3-476-03792-3_16. ISBN 978-3-476-01714-7.
- Gardiner, John Eliot (2012). "Bach Motets" (PDF). monteverdi.co.uk. pp. 6, 10–11. Archived (PDF) from the original on 24 November 2021.
- Holman, Peter (1990). "Johann Sebastian Bach (1685-1750) / The Six Motets". Hyperion Records. Archived from the original on 11 November 2021.
- Jacobi, John Christian (1756). "Jesu, Source of gladness (Jacobi)". Psalmodia Germanica: or, The German Psalmody: translated from the high Dutch together with their proper tunes and thorough bass (2nd, corrected and enlarged ed.). pp. 128–129. Archived from the original on 19 November 2013 – via hymnary.org.
- May, Thomas (2020). ""Let All That Have Breath Praise": The Motets of J.S. Bach". Los Angeles Master Chorale. Archived from the original on 22 March 2020.
- Neufeld, Marc (1997). Lied und Motette. Eine hymnologische Studie anhand des Chorals "Jesu, meine Freude" (Lied: J. Franck; Motette J. S. Bach) (in German). Munich: GRIN Verlag. ISBN 9783668590090. Archived from the original on 25 November 2021.
- Posner, Howard (2020). "Jesu, meine Freude, BWV 227 / Johann Sebastian Bach". Los Angeles Philharmonic. Archived from the original on 19 March 2020.
- Robins, Brian (2020). "Johann Sebastian Bach / Jesu, meine Freude, motet for 5-part chorus, BWV 227 (BC C5)". AllMusic.
- Veen, Johan van (2010). "CD reviews / Johann Sebastian Bach (1685-1750): Motets". musica-dei-donum.org. Archived from the original on 1 June 2013.
- "Composition Type: Sacred Music / Work: Jesu, meine Freude, BWV 227". arkivmusic.com. Archived from the original on 30 December 2021.
- "Instrumental and Supplement" (PDF). bach333.com. p. 127. Archived (PDF) from the original on 10 February 2021.
- "Jesu, meine Freude, meines Herzens Weide". hymnary.org. Archived from the original on 6 August 2020.
- "Jesu, meine Freude". ccel.org. Archived from the original on 24 September 2015.
- "Jesu, meine Freude". hymnary.org. Archived from the original on 21 October 2020.
