= Uwe Wolf (musicologist) =

German musicologist (born 1961)

- Born: 1961 (age 64–65); Kassel, Hesse, Germany
- Education: University of Tübingen; Georg-August-Universität Göttingen
- Occupation: Musicologist
- Organizations: Johann Sebastian Bach Institute; Bach-Archiv Leipzig; Carus-Verlag

Uwe Wolf (born 1961) is a German musicologist. He worked for the Johann Sebastian Bach Institute in Göttingen and Bach-Archiv Leipzig, where he developed the Bach Digital website. Since 2011, he has been chief editor of Carus-Verlag, editing the 2013 edition of Monteverdi's Vespro della Beata Vergine, among others.

== Career ==
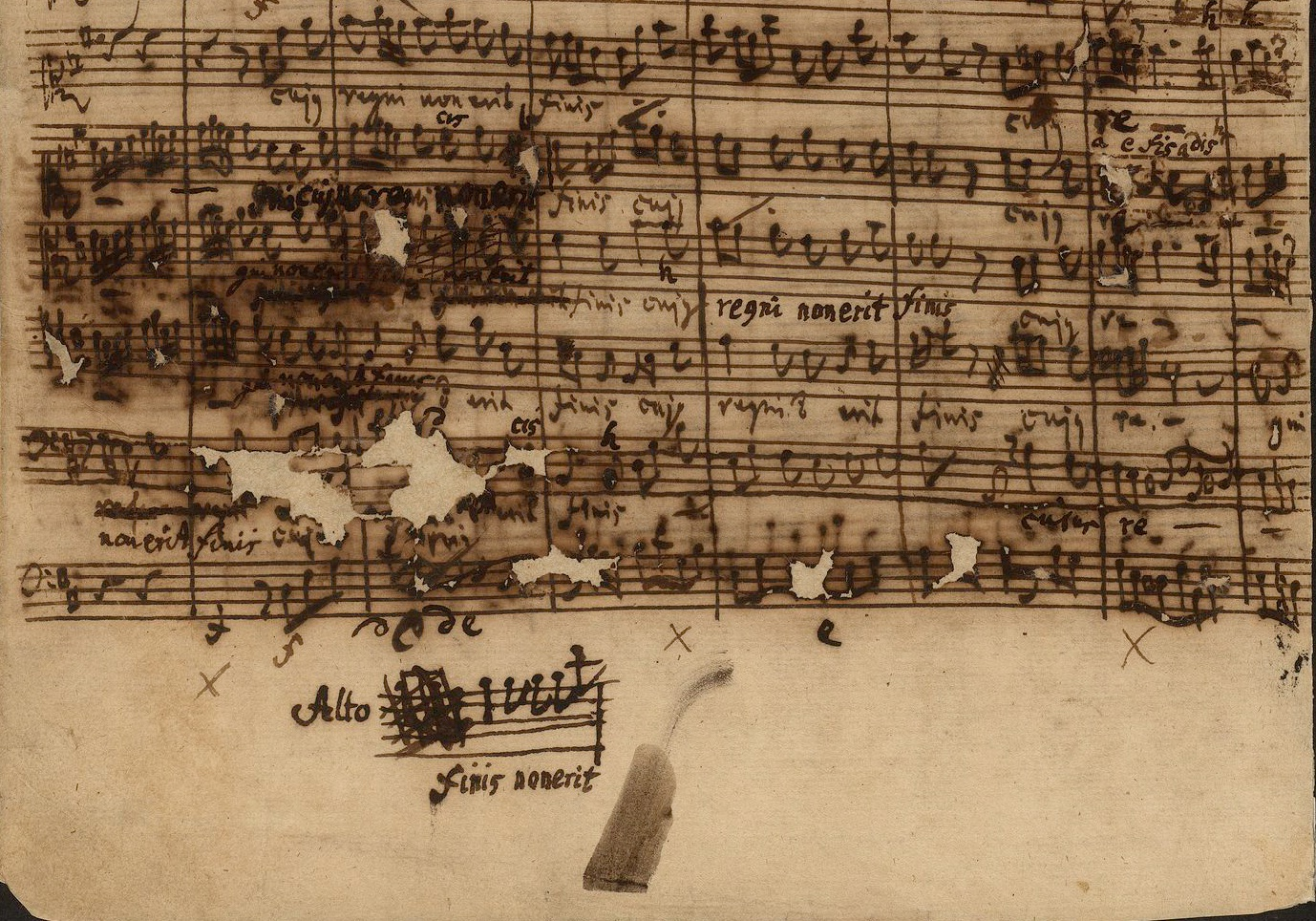
Page from Bach's Credo in the Mass in B minor, revised by C. P. E. Bach

Born in Kassel, Wolf studied musicology, and also history and auxiliary sciences of history at the University of Tübingen and Georg-August-Universität Göttingen, achieving his doctorate in 1991. He then worked as a research assistant at the Johann Sebastian Bach Institute in Göttingen to 2003. From 2004 his work was based in Leipzig, initially as scientific assistant of the project Bach-Repertorium of the Saxon Academy of Sciences and Humanities. He then worked at the Bach-Archiv Leipzig from 2005 to 2011, as director of a research department, being responsible for the new design of the Leipzig Bach Museum, and for the digital project Bach Digital. Wolf used micro X-ray fluorescence analysis to distinguish the writing of Johann Sebastian Bach and his son Carl Philipp Emanuel Bach in the score of the Mass in B minor, based on the differing amounts of lead in the two inks that were used. He edited the Mass in B minor in the revised version of the Neue Bach-Ausgabe.

Wolf has been chief editor (Cheflektor) for Carus-Verlag in Stuttgart from 2011, succeeding Günter Graulich, the founder of the publishing house. He has lectured at universities in Göttingen, Pavia/Cremona and Leipzig. He is a member of the editorial board for several complete editions.

== Publications ==
Wolf has been one of the editors of the Neue Bach-Ausgabe and its revised version. He co-edited C. P. E. Bach: The Complete Works, and other complete editions. Wolf edited the series of selected works by Gottfried August Homilius. He published research of music history of the 17th and 18th centuries, as well as on the technique of editing, among other topics.

His publications for Carus include:

- Carl Philipp Emanuel Bach: Magnificat (2014)
- Johann Sebastian Bach: Mass in B minor (2012)
- Claudio Monteverdi: Vespro della Beata Vergine (2013)

The critical edition of Monteverdi's Vespers received acclaim, as serving both small ensembles and choirs, and different instrumental realisations.
