= Susanne Erding-Swiridoff =

German 20th century composer

Susanne Zargar-Swiridoff (née Erding, born 16 November 1955) is a German composer and curator. She studied composition, English and American literature and linguistics in Stuttgart and Munich. She has composed more than 90 works of opera, orchestral music, concertos, chamber music and vocal music.

== Biography ==
Susanne Erding was born in Schwäbisch Hall, Germany. She studied composition and music education with Milko Kelemen at the State University of Music and Performing Arts Stuttgart. In 1977 she graduated in British and American studies and drama theory from the University of Stuttgart, and in 1981 in composition from the University of Music and Performing Arts Munich. She continued her studies during summer courses in England, the United States, Canada and Argentina.

In 1979 Erding-Swiridoff took a position as lecturer at the Staatliche Hochschule für Musik in Stuttgart, and in 1991 and 1992 she was a visiting professor of composition at the Musikhochschule in Mannheim. She has also lectured as a visiting professor in Madrid, Vienna, Shaoxing, Shanghai and Vilnius.

She married German journalist, broadcaster and Photographer Paul Swiridoff in Rome in 1988 and in 1994 they had a daughter, Katharina Swiridoff. Since 2002, Erding-Swiridoff has worked in curation, and published the art book Tsubaki in association with the James Joyce-Unique-book Collection.

== Stage works ==
- Joy (1983), hour-long chamber opera for 6 singers (soprano, mezzo-soprano, alto, tenor, baritone and bass) and 12 instrumentalists. Libretto by Roy Kift.
- Der Schneeman (1989), 90-minute opera for 12 singers and large orchestra. Libretto by Walter Jens.
- Peter Schlemihl (1991), puppet theater piece for string trio after Adalbert von Chamisso.
- Habba Khatoon (2012), opera for large orchestra and 8 singers after Habba Khatoon.

== Discography ==
- Un lay de consolation Hans-Christian von Dadelsen - Susanne Erding Swiridoff - Wolfgang Grandjean - Wilfried Jentzsch - Dirk Reith - Axel Ruoff
- Mouvements Dynamiques Jugendgitarrenorchester Baden-Württemberg, Leitung: Leo Brouwer, Helmut Oesterreich, Roland Boehm, (Bayer Records)
- Stephanie Haas sings "Spuren im Spiegellicht" (1984) by Susanne Erding-Swiridoff
