= Siegfried Schmalzriedt =

German musicologist

Siegfried Schmalzriedt (4 April 1941 – 9 December 2008) was a German musicologist, University lecturer and vice-rector of the Hochschule für Musik Karlsruhe.

== Life and career ==
Born in Stuttgart, Schmalzriedt studied musicology, Roman philology and comparative literature at the Universities of Tübingen, Paris and Bologna. He received his doctorate in 1969 in Tübingen with Walter Gerstenberg on the topic Heinrich Schütz und andere zeitgenössische Musiker in der Lehre Giovanni Gabrielis. From 1970 to 1976 he was assistant to Georg von Dadelsen at the musicology seminar. Until 1983 he was employed in Freiburg im Breisgau as a research assistant and editor of the Handwörterbuch der musikalischen Terminologie at the Albert-Ludwigs-Universität Freiburg.

Since 1983 he was professor of musicology at the University of Music Karlsruhe and head of the Institute for Musicology at the University of Karlsruhe. From 1986 to 1990 and again from 1992 to 1996 he served as vice-rector of the University of Music Karlsruhe.

Since 1999 he has been the editor of the Karlsruher Beiträge zur Musikwissenschaft (ISSN: 1434-4270), which is published annually.

From 1997 he was chairman of the board of trustees of the Max-Reger-Institut Karlsruhe and from 1999 to 2007 chairman of the Händel-Gesellschaft Karlsruhe. He was also active in the Handel Academy. He was a co-founder of the Association for the Promotion of Karlsruhe City History and its chairman until his death in Karlsruhe at age 67.

== Publications ==
- as editor with Walther Dürr and Thomas Seyboldt: Schuberts Lieder nach Gedichten aus seinem literarischen Freundeskreis. Auf der Suche nach dem Ton der Dichtung in der Musik (Karlsruher Beiträge zur Musikwissenschaft. Vol. 1). Lang, Frankfurt a. o. 1999, ISBN 3-631-33984-4.
- as editor: Ausdrucksformen der Musik des Barock. Passionsoratorium – Serenata – Rezitativ (Veröffentlichungen der Internationalen Händel-Akademie Karlsruhe. Vol. 7: Bericht über die Symposien der Internationalen Händel-Akademie. 6, 1998/2000). Laaber-Verlag, Laaber 2002, ISBN 3-89007-529-0.
- as editor with Jürgen Schaarwächter: Festschrift für Susanne Popp (Schriftenreihe des Max-Reger-Instituts Karlsruhe. Vol. 17: Reger-Studien. 7). Carus, Stuttgart 2004, ISBN 3-89948-064-3.
- as editor: Aspekte der Musik des Barock. Aufführungspraxis und Stil (Veröffentlichungen der Internationalen Händel-Akademie Karlsruhe. 7, 2001/2004). Laaber-Verlag, Laaber 2006, ISBN 3-89007-649-1.
- Ravels Klaviermusik. Ein musikalischer Werkführer (Beck'sche Reihe. 2210, C.-H.-Beck-Wissen). C. H. Beck, Munich 2006, ISBN 3-406-44810-0.

== Honours ==
- Susanne Mautz, Jörg Breitweg (ed.): Festschrift für Siegfried Schmalzriedt zum 60. Geburtstag. Lang, Frankfurt am Main u. a. 2001, ISBN 3-631-37815-7.
