= Bosehaus =

Coordinates: 51.3387°N 12.3723°E

The Bosehaus is a historic house in the Thomaskirchhof, Leipzig, Germany. The building is of 16th century origin, but was updated in baroque style by Georg Heinrich Bose. It currently houses the Bach-Archiv Leipzig and its Bach Museum along with the Neue Bachgesellschaft.

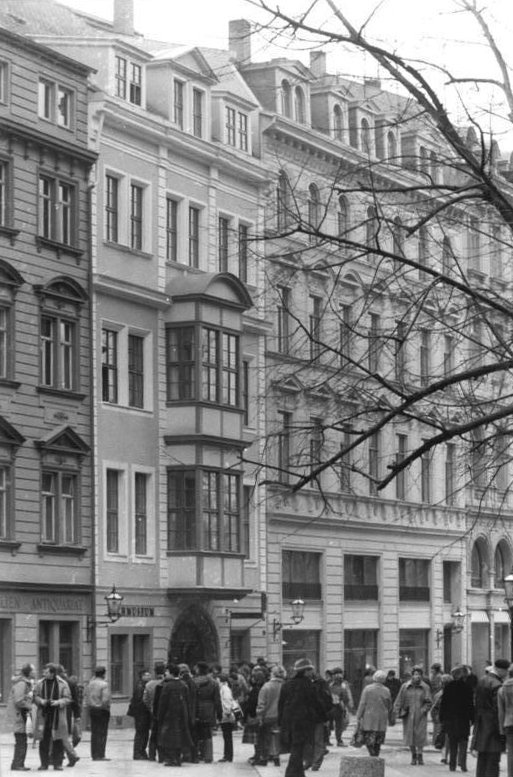
The Bosehaus in Leipzig

The building was known to Johann Sebastian Bach and it was decided in the 1980s that it would be an appropriate site for a Bach Museum. (Bach's own residence in Leipzig at the Thomasschule was destroyed at the beginning of the 20th century). The Bosehaus was restored from 2008 to 2010 to comply with the latest safety requirements for archives, and was opened again on 20 March 2010 by the President of Germany, Horst Köhler. The President stressed the importance of avoiding the accidents which had befallen archives such as the Duchess Anna Amalia Library.

== See also ==
- Architecture of Leipzig - Baroque era
