= Jesu, meine Freude =

1653 hymn composed by Johann Crüger with lyrics by Johann Franck

- Hymn by Johann Crüger
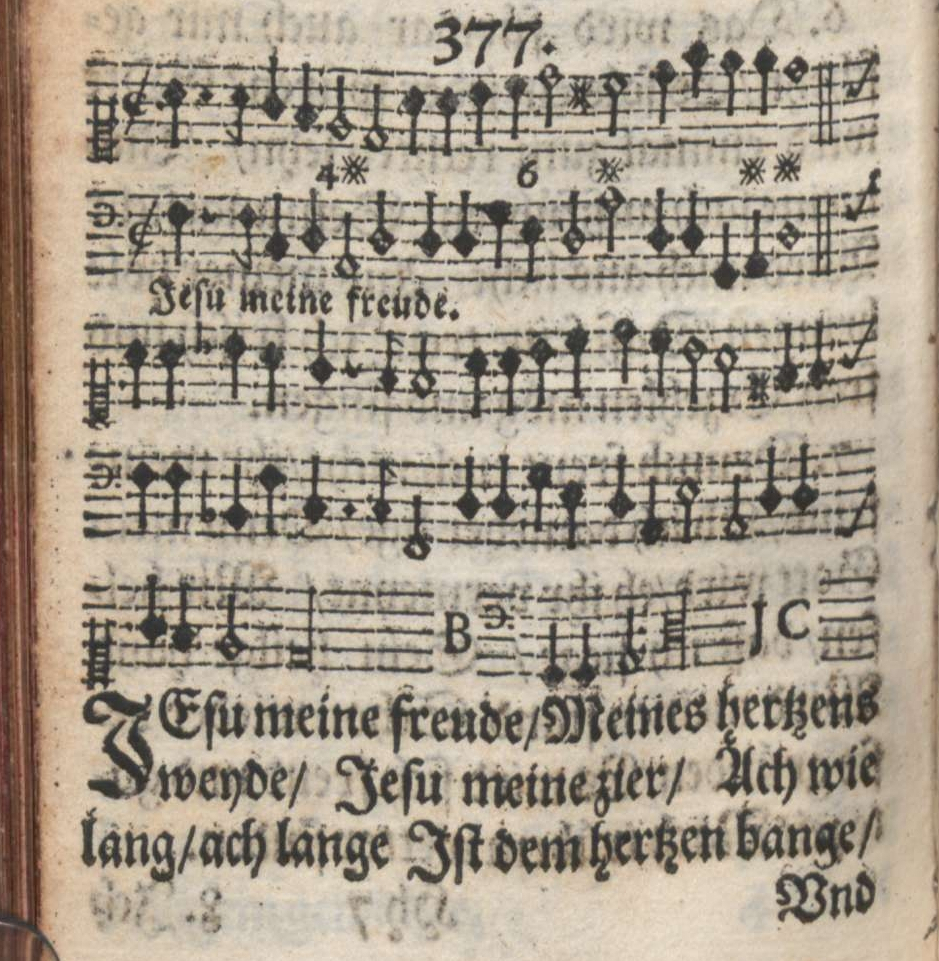
- The hymn in Johann Crüger's; Praxis pietatis melica, 1653
- English: "Jesus, Priceless Treasure"
- Catalogue: Zahn 8032
- Text: Johann Franck
- Language: German
- Published: 1653

"Jesu, meine Freude" ([ˈjeːzu ˈmaɪnə ˈfʁɔʏdə]; Jesus, my joy) is a hymn in German, written by Johann Franck, with a melody, Zahn No. 8032, by Johann Crüger. The song first appeared in Crüger's hymnal Praxis pietatis melica in 1653. The text addresses Jesus as joy and support, versus enemies and the vanity of existence. The poetry is bar form, with irregular lines from 5 to 8 syllables. The melody repeats the first line as the last, framing each of the six stanzas.

Several English translations have been made of the hymn, including Catherine Winkworth's "Jesu, priceless treasure" in 1869, and it has appeared in around 40 hymnals. There have been choral and organ settings of the hymn by many composers, including by Johann Sebastian Bach in a motet, BWV 227, for unaccompanied chorus, and a chorale prelude, BWV 610, for organ. In the modern German Protestant hymnal, Evangelisches Gesangbuch, it is No. 396.

== Text ==
The text is presented in six stanzas of nine lines each. It is in bar form; three lines form the Stollen, three the Abgesang, with the meter 6.6.5.6.6.5.7.8.6. The last line of the last stanza repeats the first line of the first stanza. The song is written in the first person, addressing Jesus. The theme of turning away from the world and to Jesus made the hymn suitable for funerals, seen as the ultimate turning away from the world:

1. Jesu, meine Freude (Jesus, my joy)
2. Unter deinem Schirmen (Beneath your protection)
3. Trotz dem alten Drachen (I defy the old dragon)
4. Weg mit allen Schätzen (Away with all treasures)
5. Gute Nacht, o Wesen (Good night, existence)
6. Weicht, ihr Trauergeister (Go away, mournful spirits)

The first stanza sets the theme of love to Jesus and the desire to be united with him, who is named Lamb, as in Revelation 5:6, and Bridegroom, based on Revelation 22:17. It is a parody of the love song "Flora, meine Freude", published in 1645 by Heinrich Albert, organist at the Königsberg Cathedral. The second stanza describes the protection of Jesus against threats by Satan, enemies, thunder, hell and sin, all pictured in drastic images.

The third stanza repeats three times Trotz (defiance), facing the enemies "old dragon" (alter Drachen), death (Tod), and fear (Furcht). The believer, feeling safe even in adverse conditions as expressed in Psalms 23:4, stands and sings (Ich steh hier und singe). The fourth stanza turns away from worldly treasures and honours, which should not separate the believer from Jesus. The fifth stanza repeats four times "Gute Nacht" (Good night), to existence in the world, to sins, to pride and pomp, and to a life of vice. The last stanza imagines the entry of Jesus as the "Freudenmeister" (master of joys), as a comforter in every misery. It alludes to Jesus entering after the resurrection (Luke 24:36).

== Hymn tune and musical settings ==
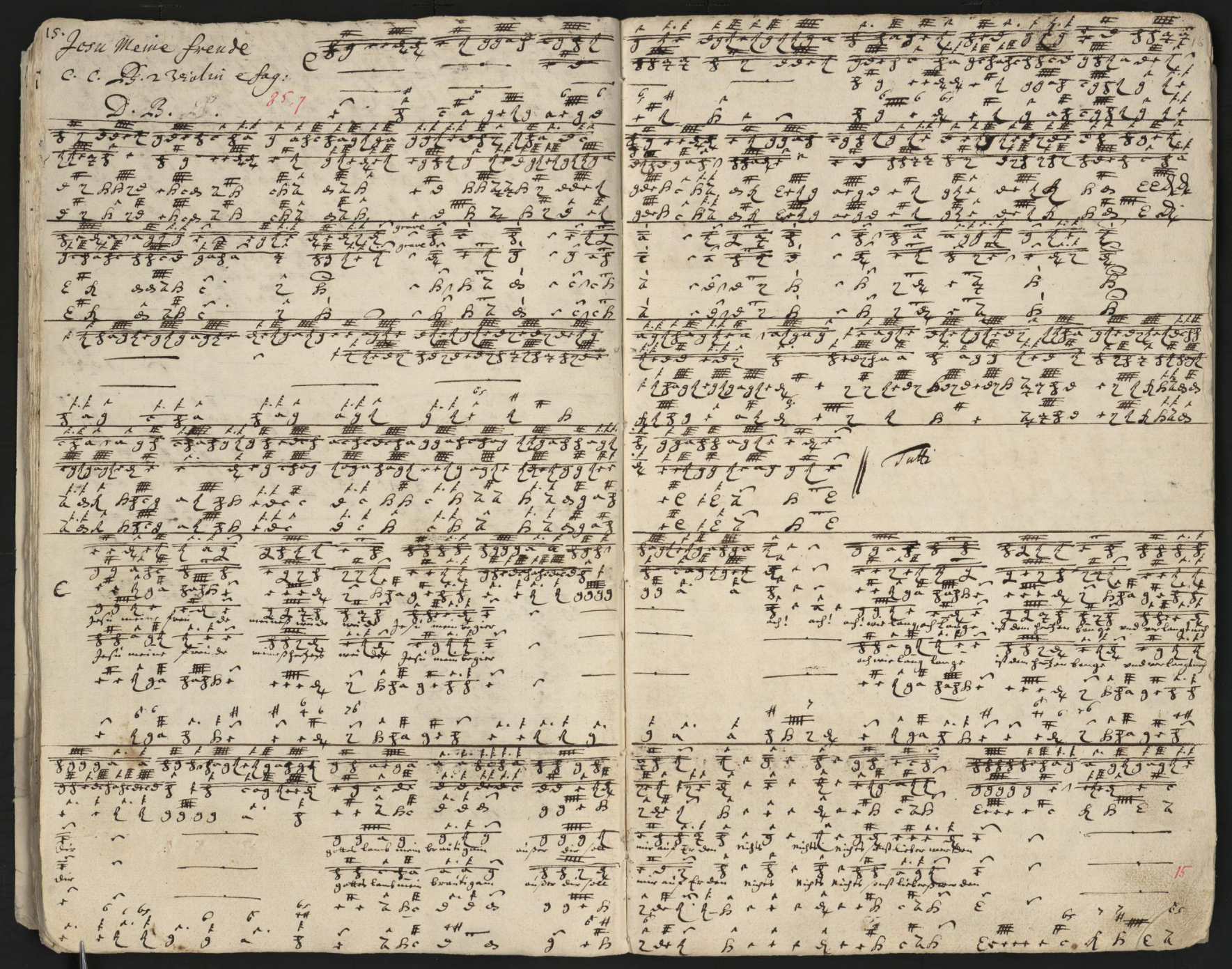
The tablature score of Buxtehude's cantata BuxWV 60

The hymn tune, Zahn 8032, in E minor culminates in the long phrase of line 8 and repeats line 1 in line 9, framing the stanza. One of the earliest choral settings occurs in the cantata BuxWV 60 by Dieterich Buxtehude, composed in the 1680s. David Pohle set it for four voices, three instruments and continuo.

=== Settings by Christoph Graupner ===
The most prolific arranger of the tune was Christoph Graupner, who, between 1709 and 1753 produced 36 original settings for performance within his cantatas for Sundays and feast days of the church calendar. Graupner uses a variety of orchestrations for these settings. For instance, in his very first setting, which ends his second cantata for the 13th Sunday after Trinity 1709 Meine Seufzer, meine Klagen (GWV 1154/09b) the accompaniment is scored for unison violins, viola and continuo. On the other hand, the setting of two stanzas from the text Nun ist auferstanden in Graupner's cantata Was sucht ihr den Lebendigen bei den Toten (GWV 1128/47) for Easter Sunday 1747 calls for a pair of trumpets and four timpani. Characteristic of many of Graupner's chorale settings, he often accompanies Jesu, meine Freude with virtuoso instrumental parts. A fine example is his setting of the third stanza of Jesu, meine Freude, Trotz dem alten Drachen which concludes his 1751 cantata for the first Sunday of Lent Wer unter dem Schirm des Höchsten (GWV 1120/51).

=== Settings by Johann Sebastian Bach ===
The hymn is the basis for Johann Sebastian Bach's motet of the same name, BWV 227. Scored for five vocal parts—two sopranos (S), alto (A), tenor (T) and bass (B)—Bach alternates the stanzas of the chorale and text from Paul's epistle to the Romans. Within an overall symmetrical structure, he varies his treatment of the verses of the hymn: stanzas 1 and 6 (transcribed below) are the same simple four part setting; stanzas 2 and 4 are settings with the cantus firmus in the soprano and an expressive accompaniment in the lower three or four voices; stanza 5 is a chorale fantasia with the cantus firmus in the alto; and stanza 3 is based on a free paraphrase of the hymn tune.

Bach also used the tune as a cantus firmus, played by a trumpet, in an aria of his cantata Weinen, Klagen, Sorgen, Zagen, BWV 12 (1714). He closed Sehet, welch eine Liebe hat uns der Vater erzeiget, BWV 64, a Christmas cantata of 1723, with the fifth stanza, and his 1724 cantata Jesus schläft, was soll ich hoffen? BWV 81, with the second stanza. The closing chorale of cantata Bisher habt ihr nichts gebeten in meinem Namen, BWV 87, (1725) is a stanza from a hymn by Heinrich Müller on the same tune. Bach set the hymn for organ in BWV 610, one of the chorale preludes in his Orgelbüchlein.

=== Others ===
Other Baroque composers who have composed chorale preludes on the hymn tune include Friedrich Wilhelm Zachow, Johann Gottfried Walther and George Frideric Handel (HWV 480). Later chorale preludes included a work by Friedrich Wilhelm Marpurg, while Johann Gottfried Müthel wrote variations in D minor on the tune. Felix Mendelssohn wrote a chorale cantata on the hymn for choir and orchestra in 1828. Max Reger composed a prelude as No. 21 of his 52 Chorale Preludes, Op. 67 in 1902. Preludes were also written by Sigfrid Karg-Elert (Op. 87, No. 2), Reinhard Schwarz-Schilling (1927), Karl Höller (Op. 22, 1936), Joseph Ahrens (1942) and Max Drischner (1945).

Günther Marks composed in 1970 a partita for viola and organ on the tune. In 2005, Gerhard Präsent arranged Bach's chorale prelude for string quartet, in Three Choral Preludes and Aria by Johann Sebastian Bach, completed and arranged for string quartet, also in a version for string trio. Steven Sametz composed a Fantasia on "Jesu, meine Freude" for SATB choir and digitally delayed treble instrument in 2009.

== Translation by Catherine Winkworth ==
The hymn was translated into English by Catherine Winkworth, a hymn translator. It is featured in the Lutheran Service Book (LSB). These are the six verses of the translated hymn.

1. Jesus, priceless treasure,
Fount of purest pleasure,
Truest friend to me.
Ah, how long in anguish
Shall my spirit languish,
Yearning, Lord, for Thee?
Thou art mine,
O Lamb divine!
I will suffer naught to hide Thee,
Naught I ask beside Thee.

2. In Thine arms I rest me;
Foes who would molest me
Cannot reach me here.
Though the earth be shaking,
Ev'ry heart be quaking,
Jesus calms my fear.
Lightnings flash
And thunders crash;
Yet, though sin and hell assail me,
Jesus will not fail me.

3. Satan, I defy thee;
Death, I now decry thee;
Fear, I bid thee cease.
World, thou shalt not harm me
Nor thy threats alarm me
While I sing of peace.
God's great pow'r
Guards ev'ry hour;
Earth and all its depths adore Him,
Silent bow before Him.

4. Hence, all earthly treasure!
Jesus is my pleasure,
Jesus is my choice.
Hence all empty glory!
Naught to me the story
Told with tempting voice.
Pain or loss,
Or shame or cross,
Shall not from my Savior move me
Since He deigns to love me.

5. Evil world, I leave thee;
Thou canst not deceive me,
Thine appeal is vein.
Sin that once did blind me,
Get thee far behind me,
Come not forth again.
Past thy hour,
O pride and pow'r;
Sinful life, thy bonds I sever,
Leave thee now forever.

6. Hence, all fear and sadness!
For the Lord of gladness,
Jesus, enters in.
Those who love the Father,
Though the storms may gather,
Still have peace within.
Yea, whate'er
I here must bear,
Thou art still my purest pleasure,
Jesus, priceless pleasure!
