= Leipzig Bach Museum =

- Bach-Museum Leipzig

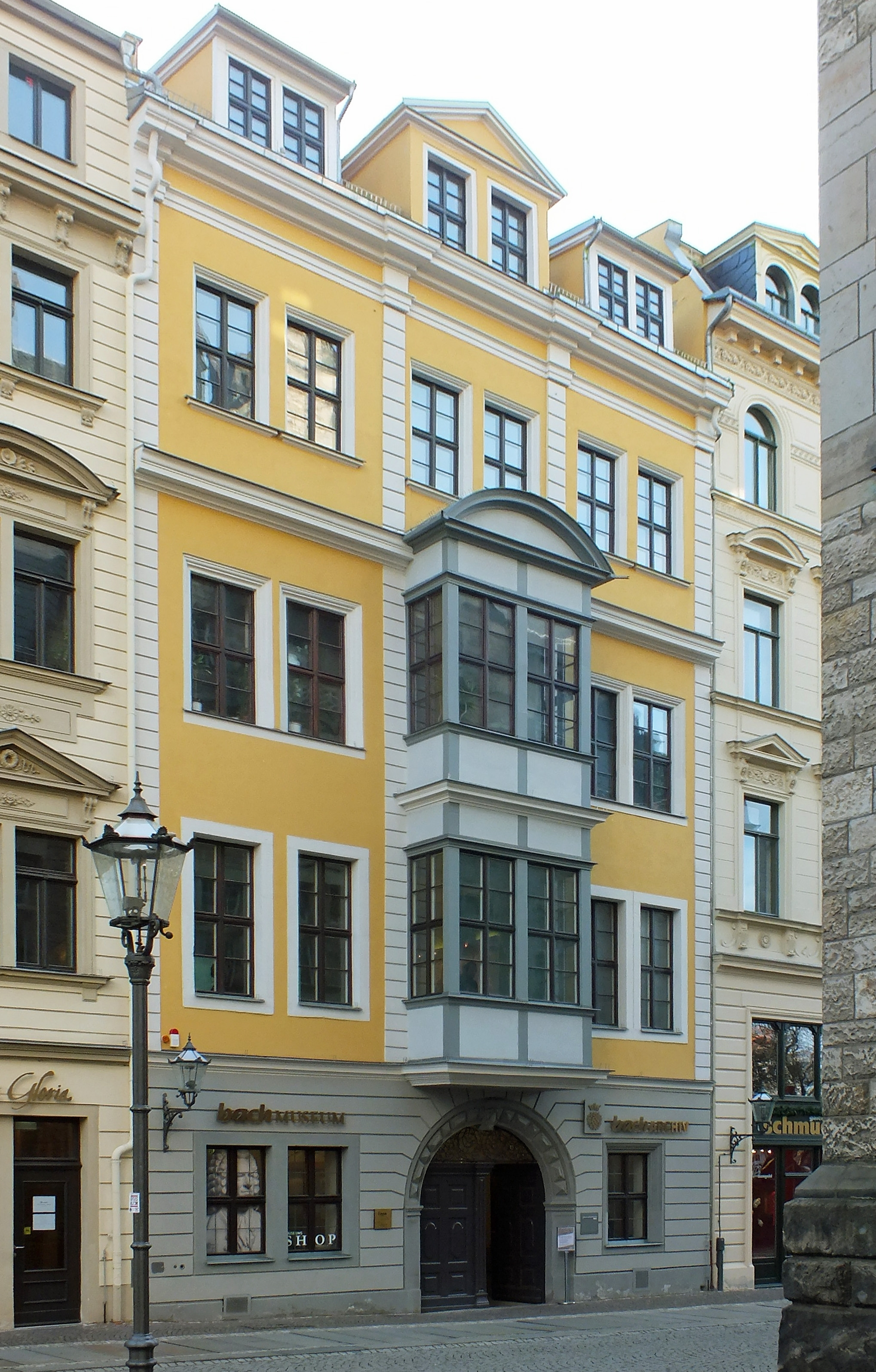
- Bosehaus which houses the Leipzig Bach Museum
- Established: 21 March 1985
- Location: Leipzig, Germany
- Coordinates: 51.3388°N 12.3723°E
- Type: Music museum
- Founder: Werner Neumann (Bach Archive)
- Director: Kerstin Wiese
- Public transit access: Leipzig-Markt by Mitteldeutschland S-Bahn, Tram Stop Thomaskirche by Leipzig trams
- Website: www.bachmuseumleipzig.de/en/bach-museum

The Leipzig Bach Museum (German: Bach-Museum Leipzig) is a museum that deals with the life and work of the composer Johann Sebastian Bach. It is part of the Bach Archive in the Bosehaus at the St. Thomas Church Square (German: Thomaskirchhof) in Leipzig, Germany.

== History ==
The museum's predecessors were the first small exhibitions at the Gohlis Palace, where the Bach Archive was located until 1985. In 1973, the first small Bach memorial was inaugurated in the entrance hall of the Bosehaus, a house dating from the Baroque period located in the St. Thomas Church Square. The Bosehaus was extensively renovated from 1983 to 1985 to house the Bach Archive and a museum.

The museum was inaugurated on the occasion of the 300th birthday of Johann Sebastian Bach on 21 March 1985 under the name "Johann-Sebastian-Bach-Museum Leipzig". The artistic design of the permanent exhibition "Johann Sebastian Bach. Life – Work – Consequences" was in the hands of Roselind Czernetzki and Ute Holstein (born 1942).

From October 1999 to March 2000, the museum was closed for 6 months and equipped with modern technology. The exhibition area has been extended to 230 square metres (2,500 square feet).

Between 2008 and 2010, the building was again fundamentally renovated. The museum, now called the "Bach-Museum Leipzig", was redesigned and considerably expanded. It has been given an air-conditioned one-storey extension with a special exhibition room and a treasure room, which adjoins the historic south wing as well as a small newly furnished pleasure garden. Since its reopening in 2010, the museum has had an exhibition area of 450 square metres (4,800 square feet). Particular emphasis is placed on cultural education work with children and young people as well as close cooperation with people with disabilities.

== Exhibition ==
Twelve thematically structured exhibition rooms report on Bach's life and work, his family, his research and much more. The exhibition is designed to be multimedia and interactive. Uwe Wolf, musicologist, designed the exhibition. A highlight of the tour is the treasure chamber, where original Bach manuscripts and other treasures are displayed. Special exhibitions include the portrait of Bach by Elias Gottlob Haussmann (1748), the organ console of St. John's Church in Leipzig, which Bach himself had examined in 1743, a box containing relics from Bach's tomb, and a recently discovered silver box in the possession of the Bach family.

== Directors ==
- Cornelia Krumbiegel (1987–2002)
- Kerstin Wiese (since 2002)

== Visitors ==
Since its opening, the museum has welcomed more than 1,100,000 visitors, as recorded in December 2020.

== Location ==
In the 1970s, the director of Bach Archive, Werner Neumann, campaigned for the transfer of Bach Archive to the Thomaskirchhof, Bach's historic workplace. The Bosehaus was familiar to Bach because of the friendly ties between the Bach and Bose families. The view from the south-facing windows of the Thomaskantor's apartment in the former St. Thomas School (demolished in 1902) was in the opposite building, just a few meters away, inhabited by the gold and silverware manufacturer Georg Heinrich Bose and his family in the Bach era.

The entrance hall is built in the Renaissance style. Baroque and neo-classicist elements occupy several rooms in the front building. An eighteenth-century concert hall has been restored. Chamber concerts are occasionally held here, mainly with music from the 17th and 18th centuries.

== Leipzig Music Trail ==
The Leipzig Bach Museum is part of the UNESCO initiative Leipziger Notenspur (Leipzig Music Trail).

== Other Johann Sebastian Bach museum ==
- Bach House, located in Eisenach in Thuringia, Germany.
