= Hans-Günter Klein =

German musicologist (1939–2016)

Hans-Günter Klein (24 November 1939 in Berlin – 7 April 2016) was a German musicologist, librarian, art historian, LGBT activist and researcher on the Mendelssohn family.

== Life and activity ==
During the Second World War, the Klein family fled to Pomerania. After that he grew up in Hamburg, where he studied musicology, philosophy and history of art. In 1969 he received his doctorate. He immediately moved to Berlin to the music department of the Staatsbibliothek zu Berlin, whose Mendelssohn Archive he joined after Rudolf Elvers left the library (1988) and headed it for fifteen years (until 2003).

Klein was heavily involved in research on musicians who were persecuted or ostracized during the National Socialist era, including Viktor Ullmann and Gideon Klein. Klein, who had also met Magnus Hirschfeld's collaborator Kurt Hiller, was one of the initiators of the founding of the Magnus-Hirschfeld-Gesellschaft, the founding meeting took place in his apartment in 1982. Klein was also one of the founding members of the Kurt Hiller Society.

Klein died in Berlin at the age of 76 and found his final resting place at Friedhof I der Dreifaltigkeitsgemeinde, Mehringdamm 21 in Berlin-Kreuzberg.

== Publications ==
- Musik und Musikpolitik im faschistischen Deutschland, 8 editions published in 1984.
- Der Einfluss der vivaldischen Konzertform im Instrumentalwerk Johann Sebastian Bachs, 17 editions published in 1970.
- Ludwig van Beethoven : Autographe u. Abschriften : Katalog by Hans-Günter Klein, 10 editions published in 1975.
- Viktor Ullmann, Materialien, 14 editions published between 1992 and 1995 in German.
- Wolfgang Amadeus Mozart, Autographe und Abschriften : Catalogue by Hans-Günter Klein, 7 editions published in 1982 in German and English.
- Tagebücher by Fanny Mendelssohn Hensel, 5 editions published in 2002 in German.
- Das verborgene Band : Felix Mendelssohn Bartholdy und seine Schwester Fanny Hensel: Exhibition of the music department of the Staatsbibliothek zu Berlin—Preussischer Kulturbesitz on the occasion of the 150th anniversary of the siblings' death, 15 May to 12 July 1997 by Hans-Günter Klein, 7 editions published in 1997 in German.
- Die Kompositionen Fanny Hensels in autographen und abschriften aus dem Besitz der Staatsbibliothek zu Berlin, Preussischer Kulturbesitz : Catalogue by Hans-Günter Klein, 8 editions published in 1995 in German.
- Viktor Ullmann : die Referate des Symposions anlässlich des 50. Todestags 14.-16. Oktober 1994 in Dornach und ergänzende Studien by Symposion anlässlich das Viktor Ullmann 50. Todestags, 8 editions published in 1996 in German.
- Heinrich von Kleist : zum Gedenken an seinen 200. Geburtstag : Ausstellung der Staatsbibliothek Preussischer Kulturbesitz in Verbindung with the Heinrich-von-Kleist-Gesellschaft e. V. in der Orangerie des Charlottenburger Schlosses, Berlin, 11 November 1977-8 January 1978 by Heinrich von Kleist, 5 editions published in 1977 in German.
- Gideon Klein : Materialien by Gideon Klein, 5 editions published in 1995 in German.
- Er ist Original! : Carl Philipp Emanuel Bach : sein musikalisches Werk in Autographen und Erstdrucken aus der Musikabteilung der Staatsbibliothek Preussischer Kulturbesitz Berlin: Exhibition on the 200th anniversary of the composer's death, 14 December 1988 bis 11 February 1989 by Carl Philipp Emanuel Bach, 7 editions published in 1988 in German.
- Briefe aus Rom an ihre Familie in Berlin 1839/40 by Fanny Mendelssohn Hensel, 4 editions published in 2002 in German.
- ... es wird der Tod zum Dichter: die Referate des Kolloquiums zur Oper "Der Kaiser von Atlantis" by Viktor Ullmann in Berlin on 4./5. November 1995, 6 editions published between 1996 and 1997 in German
- Die Handschrift Johann Sebastian Bachs: Musikautographe aus der Musikabteilung der Staatsbibiliothek Preussischer Kulturbesitz, Berlin : Exhibition for the 300th birthday of J.S. Bach, 22 March to 13 July 1985 by the Staatsbibliothek Preussischer Kulturbesitz, 7 editions published in 1985 in German
- Briefe aus Venedig und Neapel an ihre Familie in Berlin 1839/40 by Fanny Mendelssohn Hensel, 3 editions published in 2004 in German.
- Lebe im Augenblick, lebe in der Ewigkeit: die Referate des Symposions aus Anlass des 100th birthday of Viktor Ullmann in Berlin on 31 October/1 November 1998 by Symposion on the occasion of the 100th birthday of Viktor Ullmann, 4 editions published in 2000 in German.
- Felix Mendelssohn Bartholdy : Autographe und Abschriften: catalogue by Hans-Günter Klein, 6 editions published in 2003 in German.
- Die Musikveranstaltungen bei den Mendelssohns - ein 'musikalischer Salon'?: die Referate des Symposions am 2 September 2006 in Leipzig, 4 editions published in 2006 in German.
- Wolfgang Amadeus Mozart : Componiern-- meine einzige freude und Passion: Autographe und frühe Drucke aus dem Besitz der Berliner Staatsbibliotheken : an exhibition on the 200th anniversary of the composer's death from 5 December 1991 to 8 February 1992 in Berlin by Hans-Günter Klein.
