= Bach Digital =

Online database of Bach family compositions

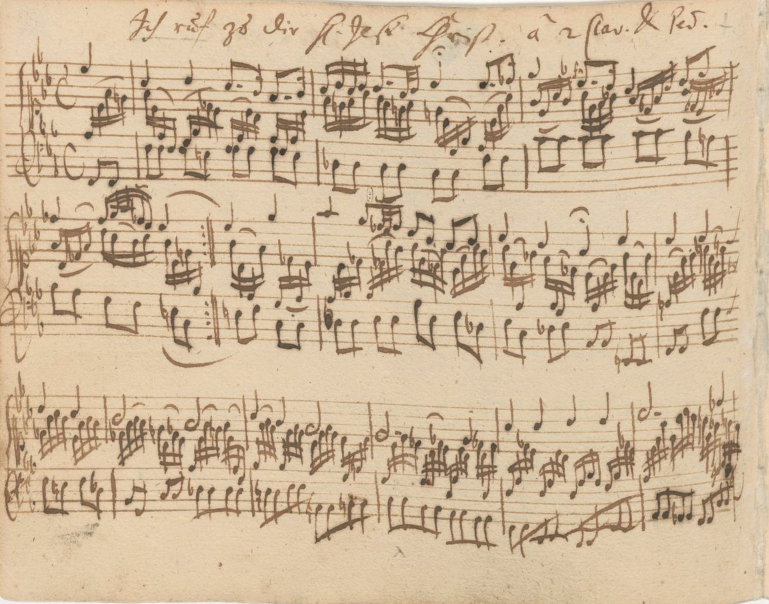
- The Bach Digital website features images and descriptions of composition manuscripts and related documents by members of the Bach family. For instance, the page for BWV 639 (Bach Digital Work 727) links to the source page on D-B Mus.ms. Bach P 283, which contains an image of Johann Sebastian Bach's autograph of that work (pictured above).
- Website type: Database portal
- Owners: Bach Archive; SBB; SLUB; SUB Hamburg; Leipzig University
- Creator: Uwe Wolf
- Website: www.bach-digital.de
- Commercial: No
- Launched: 2010; 16 years ago
- Content license: Creative Commons (BY-NC)
- Written in: MyCoRe
- OCLC number: 50480716

Bach Digital (German: Bach digital), developed by the Bach Archive in Leipzig, is an online database which gives access to information on compositions by Johann Sebastian Bach and members of his family. Early manuscripts of such compositions are a major focus of the website, which provides access to high-resolution digitized versions of many of these. Scholarship on manuscripts and versions of compositions is summarized on separate pages, with references to scholarly sources and editions. The database portal has been online since 2010.

== History ==
In 2000, two years after Uwe Wolf had suggested the possibility of supporting the publication of the New Bach Edition (NBE) with digital media, a project named Bach Digital started as an initiative of the Internationale Bachakademie Stuttgart, but without direct involvement of the then editor of the NBE, the Johann Sebastian Bach Institute in Göttingen. After four years the project remained unconvincing: it lagged behind technically and came to nothing, and its www.bachdigital.org web address went up for sale.

The first steps towards a new project, with the same name, were taken that same year. The aim of making images of autographs and original manuscripts available via the internet was continued from the former project, but aiming in the new project at high-resolution scans, for which the Zoomify application was going to be used. The project would cooperate with the Bach Institute in Göttingen. As that institute was going to cease operations (which eventually happened in 2006), however, the idea arose to merge the institute and the project. With the input of the Göttingen institute, the website was now going to not only display high-resolution digital facsimiles but also offer detailed descriptions of manuscripts and compositions which were drawn from Der Göttinger Bach-Katalog / Die Quellen der Bach-Werke (The Göttingen catalogue / The Sources of Bach's works), developed in Göttingen since 2001. Funding for the project by the Deutsche Forschungsgemeinschaft was secured in 2007.

With Uwe Wolf as a leading designer, the development of the website began in 2008, and the database went online in 2010. At the time, around 40% of the 697 manuscripts of Bach's works held in libraries in Berlin, Dresden, Leipzig and Krakau (which account for about 90% of his works) were made available in digital form. The site not only provides accessibility to the distributed documents but also helps their preservation. Several international libraries made their documents available, including libraries in Europe and the U.S. Works from the period of c. 1700 to 1850, in manuscripts, copies and early prints, have been collected and presented in high-resolution digitized form. New research has been added continuously, for example on watermarks and copyists.

== Partners ==
Bach Digital is a collaborative project of the Leipzig Bach Archive (together with the University Computer Centre of Leipzig University), Berlin State Library (SBB), Saxon State and University Library Dresden (SLUB) and Staats- und Universitätsbibliothek Hamburg (SUB Hamburg). Apart from the sponsoring by the Deutsche Forschungsgemeinschaft, funding for access to international documents has been granted by the national Beauftragter der Bundesregierung für Kultur und Medien since 2013. An input of technical know-how was provided through a partnership with IBM.

Bach Digital is part of the Deutsche Digitale Bibliothek and Europeana platforms. Internationally, contributions of information came from the British Library in London, the Library of Congress in Washington, Harvard University Library in Boston, and the music libraries of Yale University and the Juilliard School. Libraries also contributing have included the Frankfurt University Library, Bachhaus Eisenach, Universitätsbibliothek Johann Christian Senckenberg, Württembergische Landesbibliothek, Stadtbibliothek Leipzig, Germanisches Nationalmuseum, Heimatmuseum Saalfeld, Herzogin Anna Amalia Bibliothek, and Stiftelsen Musikkulturens Fraemjande in Stockholm.

== Content and structure ==
The website was designed to serve Bach scholars, performers of his works, especially in historically informed performance, and interested lay people. Information collected with scientific scrutiny is freely available, not only for works by J. S. Bach but also those of members of his family (Carl Philipp Emanuel Bach, Wilhelm Friedemann Bach, Johann Christian Bach) and works found in the Altbachisches Archiv.

Bach Digital aims at making Bach research easily available, and uses an implementation of the MyCoRe platform to do so. Its content is licensed under Creative Commons as Attribution-NonCommercial 4.0 International (CC BY-NC 4.0).

=== Work pages ===
The website hosts separate pages for compositions: the static URLs for these pages start with http://www.bachdigital.de/receive/BachDigitalWork_work_ and end with an eight-digit number (the first four being leading zeros for works in the 1998 version of the BWV catalogue). Each of these numbers thus identifies a work, e.g.:

- No. 00000001 → http://www.bachdigital.de/receive/BachDigitalWork_work_00000001 = BWV 1
- No. 00000632 → http://www.bachdigital.de/receive/BachDigitalWork_work_00000632 = BWV 552
- No. 00001524 → http://www.bachdigital.de/receive/BachDigitalWork_work_00001524 = BWV Anh. 213

Apart from later additions and corrections, these numbers follow the collation of BWV numbers, but with alternative versions of the same composition inserted immediately after the BWV number of the composition to which they belong, e.g.:

- BWV 80 = Bach Digital Work (BDW) No. 00099
- BWV 80a = BDW 00100
- BWV 80b = BDW 00101
- BWV 81 = BDW 00102

An example of a later addition/correction:

- BWV Anh. 71 → renumbered to BWV 1128 → new Bach Digital Work number beyond the one for BWV Anh. 213: BDW 01725

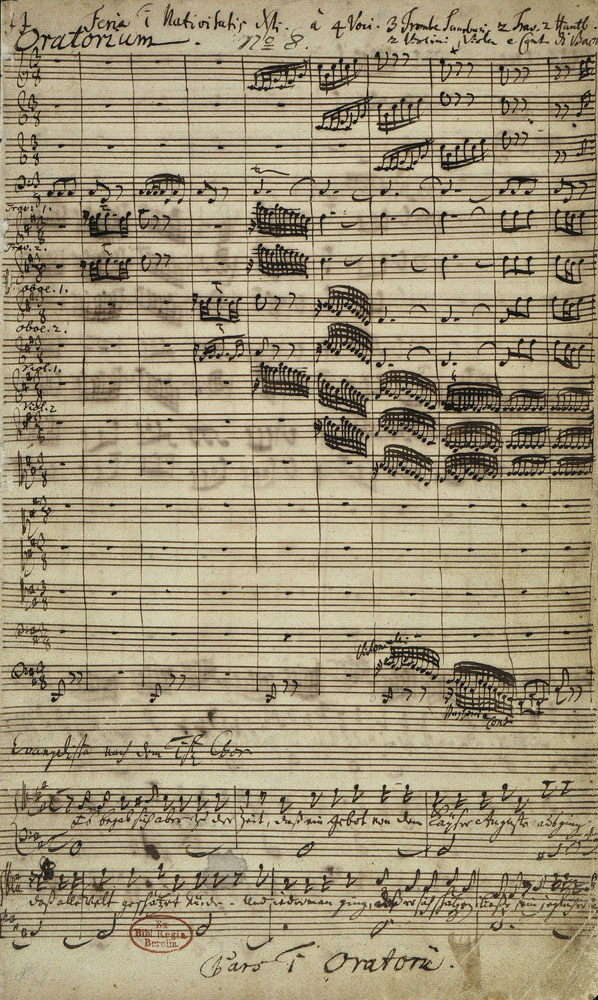
Start of the music in Johann Sebastian Bach's autograph score of the Christmas Oratorio

=== Source pages ===
Primary sources described on separate webpages (many with a facsimile of the original source) similarly have a unique number, which preceded by http://www.bachdigital.de/receive/BachDigitalSource_source_ gives the static URL for that page, e.g.

- No. 00002542 → https://www.bachdigital.de/receive/BachDigitalSource_source_00002542 = D-B Mus.ms. Bach St 345

== Reception ==
Writing when the Bach Digital website was in its last stages of development, shortly before going online, Johannes Kepper of Paderborn University thought it would not only satisfy lay visitors feeling adoration for Bach but also had a role for scholars, for instance those initiating new critical editions of his music. According to Kepper, however, Bach Digital is not to be seen as a published edition of the composer's work but rather a collection of annotated sources: in itself it is not a critical edition of Bach's music. He sees another possible use of the website: it allows interested readers to check the quality of published editions of Bach's music and assess editorial choices by comparing such editions with the original manuscripts, displayed in high resolution on the website.

According to Yo Tomita, writing in 2016, databases such as Bach Digital have largely replaced printed scholarship, such as the Critical Commentary volumes of the NBE, as the first point of entry for Bach scholars.

An analysis of database usage in 2016 observed a total of 101,598 views, mainly from European countries, the U.S. and Japan but also from countries such as China, Brazil, Mexico, Vietnam and the Arabian Emirates. In the month of December, 32,537 views were counted, 896 of them for the autograph of Bach's Christmas Oratorio, the manuscript creating the most interest.
