= Jesus schläft, was soll ich hoffen? BWV 81 =

Church cantata by Johann Sebastian Bach

Jesus schläft, was soll ich hoffen?
- BWV 81
- Church cantata by J. S. Bach
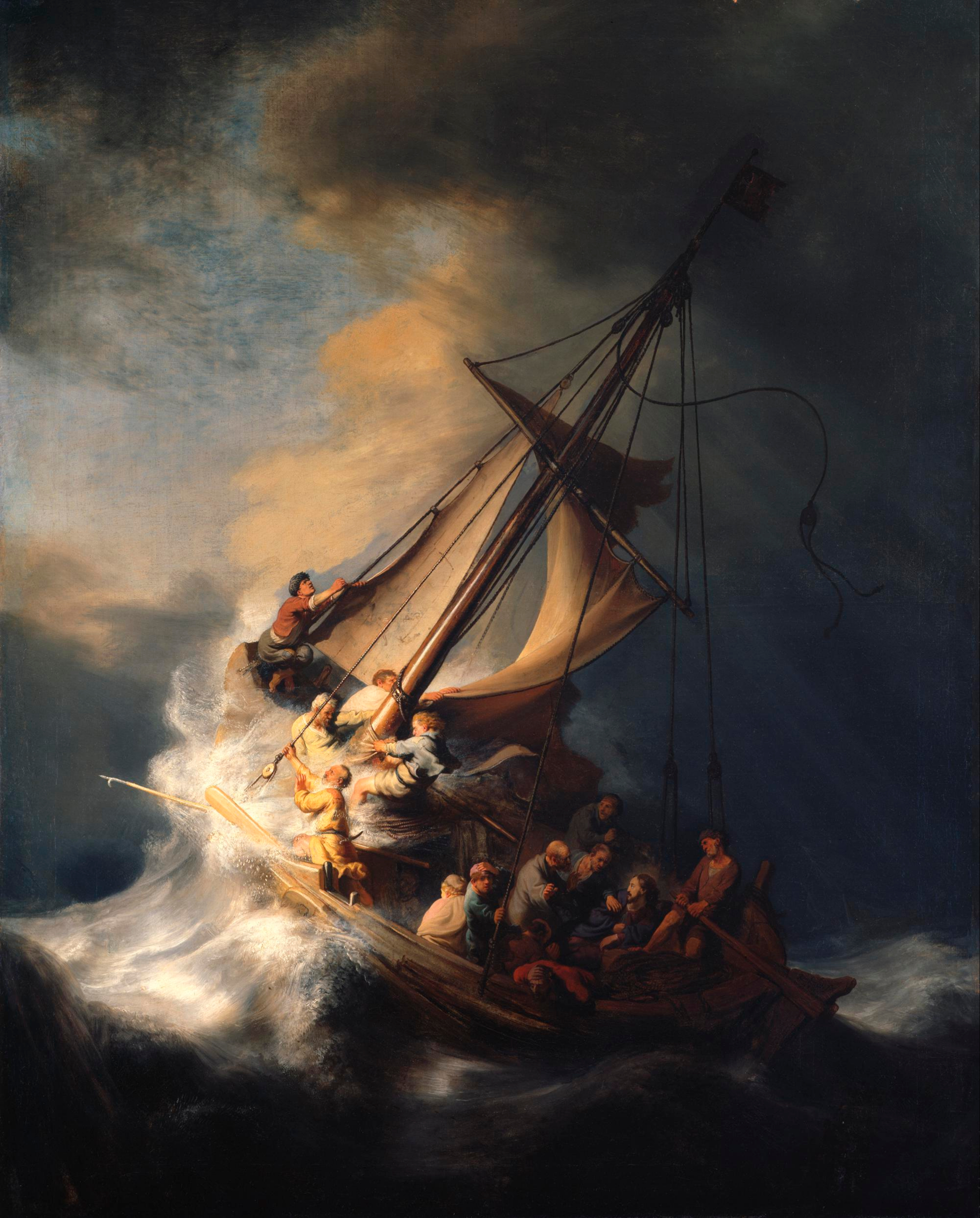
- The Storm on the Sea of Galilee by Rembrandt, 1632
- Occasion: Fourth Sunday after Epiphany
- Bible text: Matthew 8:26
- Chorale: "Jesu, meine Freude"
- Performed: 30 January 1724: Leipzig
- Movements: 7
- Vocal: solo: alto, tenor and bass; SATB choir
- Instrumental: 2 oboes d'amore; 2 recorders; 2 violins; 2 violas; continuo

Jesus schläft, was soll ich hoffen? (Jesus sleeps, what shall I hope for?), BWV 81, is a church cantata by Johann Sebastian Bach. He composed it in 1724 in Leipzig for the fourth Sunday after Epiphany and first performed it on 30 January 1724.

== History and words ==
Bach wrote the cantata in his first year in Leipzig for the Fourth Sunday after Epiphany. A fourth Sunday after Epiphany is rare and occurs only in years with a late date of Easter. The prescribed readings for the Sunday were taken from the Epistle to the Romans, love completes the law (Romans 13:8–10), and from the Gospel of Matthew, Jesus calming the storm (after sleeping in the boat) (Matthew 8:23–27). The poet is unknown, but Erdmann Neumeister and Christian Weiss have been suggested by scholars. The poet refers to the Gospel and expands on the contrast of Jesus hidden (sleeping) and appearing (acting), similar to Mein Gott, wie lang, ach lange? BWV 155, written in 1716 and performed three weeks earlier on the First Sunday after Epiphany. The words of movement 4 are a quote from the Gospel, the question of Jesus: "Ihr Kleingläubigen, warum seid ihr so furchtsam?" (Why are ye fearful, O ye of little faith?). The closing chorale is the second stanza of Johann Franck's hymn "Jesu, meine Freude".

Bach first performed the cantata on 30 January 1724.

== Scoring and structure ==
The cantata in seven movements is scored for alto, tenor and bass soloists, a four-part choir in the chorale, two oboes d'amore, two recorders, two violins, viola, and basso continuo. The recorders and the oboes were probably played by the same musicians.

1. Aria (alto): Jesus schläft, was soll ich hoffen?
2. Recitative (tenor): Herr! warum trittest du so ferne?
3. Aria (tenor): Die schäumenden Wellen von Belials Bächen
4. Arioso (bass): Ihr Kleingläubigen, warum seid ihr so furchtsam?
5. Aria (bass): Schweig, aufgetürmtes Meer!
6. Recitative (alto): Wohl mir, mein Jesus spricht ein Wort
7. Chorale: Unter deinen Schirmen

== Music ==
Bach expresses the questions of the anxious "soul" in a dramatic way, similar to dialogues such as in O Ewigkeit, du Donnerwort, BWV 60. The first aria speaks of the "sleeping", illustrated by the recorders, low registers of the strings, and long notes in the voice. Bach used similar means also in the aria Sanfte soll mein Todeskummer of his Easter Oratorio. The third movement almost visualizes the storm and the movement of the waves, similar to scenes in contemporary operas. The central fourth movement within a symmetrical arrangement is devoted to the bass as the vox Christi (voice of Christ). The continuo and the voice use similar material in this arioso, intensifying the words. The following aria, marked allegro, contrasts the "storm", in unison runs of the strings, with calmer motion in the oboes.

The closing chorale is set for four parts. It is the second verse of "Jesu, meine Freude", a chorale by Johann Franck with a melody by Johann Crüger which appeared first in his Praxis pietatis melica published in Berlin in 1653.

Bach composed a similar symmetry around a biblical word in 1726 in Brich dem Hungrigen dein Brot, BWV 39.

== Selected recordings ==
- Bach Cantatas Vol. 1 – Advent and Christmas, Karl Richter, Münchener Bach-Chor, Münchener Bach-Orchester, Anna Reynolds, Peter Schreier, Theo Adam, Archiv Produktion 1972
- J. S. Bach: Das Kantatenwerk – Sacred Cantatas Vol. 5, Nikolaus Harnoncourt, Tölzer Knabenchor, Concentus Musicus Wien, Paul Esswood, Kurt Equiluz, Ruud van der Meer, Teldec 1978
- Die Bach Kantate Vol. 25, Helmuth Rilling, Gächinger Kantorei, Bach-Collegium Stuttgart, Julia Hamari, Adalbert Kraus, Siegmund Nimsgern, Hänssler 1983
- J. S. Bach: Complete Cantatas Vol. 8, Ton Koopman, Amsterdam Baroque Orchestra & Choir, Bogna Bartosz, Jörg Dürmüller, Klaus Mertens, Antoine Marchand 1998
- J. S. Bach: Complete Cantatas Vol. 8, Pieter Jan Leusink, Holland Boys Choir, Netherlands Bach Collegium, Sytse Buwalda, Knut Schoch, Bas Ramselaar, Brilliant Classics 1999
- Bach Cantatas Vol. 19: Greenwich/Romsey, John Eliot Gardiner, Monteverdi Choir, English Baroque Soloists, William Towers, Paul Agnew, Peter Harvey, Soli Deo Gloria 2000
- J. S. Bach: Cantatas Vol. 21 – Cantatas from Leipzig 1724, Masaaki Suzuki, Bach Collegium Japan, Robin Blaze, James Gilchrist, Peter Kooy, BIS 2002
- J. S. Bach: Cantatas for the Complete Liturgical Year Vol. 8, Sigiswald Kuijken, La Petite Bande, Gerlinde Sämann, Petra Noskaiová, Christoph Genz, Jan van der Crabben, Accent 2008

== Sources ==
- Jesus schläft, was soll ich hoffen? BWV 81: Scores at the International Music Score Library Project
- Jesus schläft, was soll ich hoffen BWV 81; BC A 39 / Sacred cantata (4th Sunday of Epiphany) Bach Digital
- Cantata BWV 81 Jesus schläft, was soll ich hoffen? history, scoring, sources for text and music, translations to various languages, discography, discussion, bach-cantatas website
- BWV 81 Jesus schläft, was soll ich hoffen? English translation, University of Vermont
- BWV 81 Jesus schläft, was soll ich hoffen? text, scoring, University of Alberta
- Luke Dahn: BWV 81.7 bach-chorales.com
