= Wilhelm Martin Luther =

German librarian and musicologist (1912–1962)

Wilhelm Martin Luther (27 November 1912 – 2 June 1962) was a German librarian, musicologist and director of the Göttingen State and University Library.

== Life ==
Born in Erdmannrode, Luther studied musicology, philosophy and theology in Göttingen and Berlin. In 1936 he received his doctorate with a thesis on Gallus Dressler in Göttingen. He completed his studies with a doctorate and state examination. He entered the academic library service in 1939; after his subject examination in 1941 at the Berlin State Library he worked at the Göttingen University Library.

Under Karl Julius Hartmann he was promoted to deputy director, and in 1958 he succeeded him in his office. Luther was particularly committed to the re-establishment of the German [interlibrary loan] after the end of the Second World War and to (central) cataloguing. Thus the "Central Catalogue of Foreign Literature" was maintained in Göttingen, which formed an important basis for interlibrary loan. He also founded the Niedersächsische Zentralkatalog, set up the Göttingen journal reference and pushed for a reworking of the Göttingen Schlagwortkatalog.

In addition to his work in the library, he was also active in teaching and published several articles on library science and librarianship. In 1959 he was appointed honorary professor in Göttingen, where he taught general bibliography and documentation, library science and history of science. For the second edition of the "Handbuch der Bibliothekswissenschaften" he revised the chapter on the use of libraries, together with Wilhelm Krabbe he wrote the "Lehrbuch der Bibliotheksverwaltung".

With Willi Kahl he published the Repertorium der Musikwissenschaft (Repertory of Musicology), an important location reference for music literature in German libraries. On the occasion of the 200th anniversary of the death of Johann Sebastian Bach he prepared the exhibition Documenta, which was shown in Göttingen, Schaffhausen, Florence and Milan and attracted more than 20,000 visitors. Since 1961, Luther also served as director of the Johann Sebastian Bach Institute in Göttingen.

Until shortly before his death, Luther was active in various professional associations: He was part of the Association of German Librarians (VDB), the Library Committee of the German Research Foundation as well as that of the Association Internationale des Bibliothèques Musicales (chairman from 1951 to 1953) and was chairman of the "University Libraries" section of the International Federation of Library Associations and Institutions. (IFLA). In 1961 he was elected chairman of the VDB, but had to resign after only a few months due to a serious illness. Luther died on 2 June 1962, in Göttingen, at age 49.

== Publications ==
- Luther, Wilhelm M.: Gallus Dressler (1533 bis etwa 1589). Ein Beitrag zur Geschichte des protestantischen Schulkantorats im 16. Jahrhundert (Göttinger musikwissenschaftliche Arbeiten 1), Göttingen 1942, and University of Göttingen dissertation.
- Luther, Wilhelm M. (ed.): Johann Sebastian Bach. Documenta, Kassel, Basel 1950.
- Luther, Wilhelm M.; Krabbe, Wilhelm: Lehrbuch der Bibliotheksverwaltung, Stuttgart 1953.
- Kahl, Willi; Luther, Wilhelm M. (eds.): Repertorium der Musikwissenschaft. Musikschrifttum, Denkmäler und Gesamtausgaben in Auswahl (1800–1950) mit Besitzvermerken deutscher Bibliotheken und musikwissenschaftlicher Institute, Kassel, Basel 1953.
- Luther, Wilhelm M.: Der internationale Leihverkehr. In Libri 7, 2–3 (1957), pp. 97–120, doi:10.1515/libr.1958.7.1-4.97.
- Luther, Wilhelm M.: Die nicht-liturgischen Musikinkunabeln der Göttinger Bibliothek. In: Voigt, Christian (ed.): Libris et litteris. Festschrift für Hermann Tiemann zum 60. Geburtstag am 9. Juli 1959 (Veröffentlichung. Maximilian-Gesellschaft 75), Hamburg 1959, pp. 130–148.
- Luther, Wilhelm M.: Die Bibliotheksbenutzung. In: Milkau, Fritz; Leyh, Georg (eds.): Handbuch der Bibliothekswissenschaft, 2nd ed. Wiesbaden 1961, pp. 357–507.
