= Georg von Dadelsen =

German musicologist (1918–2007)

- Born: 17 November 1918; Dresden, Saxony, Germany
- Died: 25 May 2007 (aged 88); Tübingen, Baden-Württemberg, Germany
- Education: University of Kiel; Humboldt University Berlin; Free University of Berlin
- Occupation: Musicologist
- Organizations: University of Hamburg; Johann Sebastian Bach Institute; University of Tübingen; Musikgeschichtliche Kommission
- Known for: Neue Bach-Ausgabe

Georg von Dadelsen (17 November 1918 – 25 May 2007) was a German musicologist, who taught at the University of Hamburg and the University of Tübingen. He focused on Johann Sebastian Bach, his family and his environment, and the chronology of his works. As director of the Johann Sebastian Bach Institute in Göttingen, he influenced the Neue Bach-Ausgabe (NBA), the second complete edition of Bach's works.

== Life ==
Von Dadelsen was born in Dresden. He obtained his Abitur at the humanistic Gymnasium in Berlin-Zehlendorf. After military service and captivity, he studied musicology at the University of Kiel with Blume from 1946, at the Humboldt University Berlin with Vetter from 1947, and at the Free University of Berlin from 1948 with Walter Gerstenberg. Von Dadelsen also took courses in philosophy, and German language and literature. In 1951 he received his doctorate at the Free University of Berlin with the dissertation Alter Stil und alte Techniken in der Musik des 19. Jahrhunderts (Old style and old techniques in the music of the 19th century).

In 1952, von Dadelsen and his wife Dorothee followed Gerstenberg to the musicological institute of the University of Tübingen, where he worked as Gerstenberg's assistant. From 1953 to 1959, he conducted the university's orchestra. During this time he also worked as music critic. In 1958, he achieved his habilitation with the dissertation Beiträge zur Chronologie der Werke Johann Sebastian Bachs, about the chronology of Bach's works. In 1960, he was appointed as professor of musicology at the Hamburg University. From 1971, he held the same position in Tübingen until his retirement in 1983. Among his students were Konrad Küster, Sylke Zimpel, and Siegfried Schmalzriedt.

Von Dadelsen was director of the Johann Sebastian Bach Institute in Göttingen from 1961 to 1993. As president of the editorial board of the Neue Bach-Ausgabe (NBA), he influenced the second complete edition of Bach's works in a decisive phase. He initiated a selected edition of the musical works of E. T. A. Hoffmann, which have been published since 1976. He wrote books and numerous articles on music history, including some articles of the first edition of Die Musik in Geschichte und Gegenwart (Music in history and present). He was president of the Musikgeschichtliche Kommission from 1973 to 1988, where he led the series Das Erbe deutscher Musik from 1959 to 1998.

== Family ==
Von Dadelsen was married to the journalist Dorothee von Dadelsen, the daughter of the scientist Emil Dovifat. The composer Hans-Christian von Dadelsen and the ZDF journalist Bernhard von Dadelsen are sons of the couple.

Von Dadelsen died in Tübingen at age 88.

== Work ==
- 1951: Alter Stil und alte Techniken in der Musik des 19. Jahrhunderts
- 1957: Bemerkungen zur Handschrift Johann Sebastian Bachs, seiner Familie und seines Kreises, in Tübinger Bach-Studien I, Trossingen
- 1958: Beitrag zur Chronologie der Werke Johann Sebastian Bachs, Habilitation at the Tübingen University, Tübinger Bach-Studien IV und V, Tübingen
- 1967: Editionsrichtlinien musikalischer Denkmäler und Gesamtausgaben, published on behalf of the Gesellschaft für Musikforschung, Kassel
- 1985: Bachs Werke im Originaltext – Aufgaben und Erkenntnisse der Neuen Bach-Ausgabe. In: Neue Zürcher Zeitung. 16 March 1985. (re-printed in Johann-Sebastian-Bach-Institut Göttingen und Bach-Archiv Leipzig (eds.): Die Neue Bach-Ausgabe 1954–2007 – Eine Dokumentation. Bärenreiter, Kassel/Basel/London/New York/Prag 2007, pp. 11–16.)
