= Hans-Christian von Dadelsen =

German composer

Hans-Christian von Dadelsen (born 4 December 1948) is a German composer and music writer. He is the son of the musicologist Georg von Dadelsen and journalist Dorothee von Dadelsen.

== Life ==
Born in Berlin, von Dadelsen spent his childhood in Tübingen and Hamburg, where he studied at the Hamburg Musikhochschule after graduating from high school. He studied composition and music theory with Diether de la Motte and György Ligeti as well as music education with Hermann Rauhe. At the Darmstadt Holiday Courses in 1972, in a lecture entitled 'Tendenzen zu einer neuartigen Tonalität' (Tendencies towards a New Tonality), he suggested a thorough turnaround of modernism, also pointing to "Pop Art" and new "Romanticism", thus also initiating a number of misunderstood and by many other composers taken up changes in the stylistics of the 1970s ("Neuromanticism"). As a composer, he himself took up influences from Pop Art and American stylistics at an early stage and distinguished himself above all in the field of polyrhythmic. Inventions and iridescent harmonic concepts.

From 1980 onwards Dadelsen gradually developed a consistently polyrhythmic style ("flexible beats") together with the composer Babette Koblenz. A series of works for orchestra, music theatre and chamber ensemble as well as conceptual solo works ("Rhythmische Studien") were created. As an author, Dadelsen has published numerous essays in the field of cultural philosophy as well as analyses and studies on rhythm theory and studies on the work of Bob Dylan, Steve Reich, György Ligeti and Wilhelm Killmayer. In 1986–94, he worked as a lecturer at the Darmstadt Summer Courses. In 1998–2004 followed the direction and conception of the Hamburg chamber music festival "P0P – Pur oder Plus"; In 1999 together with Manfred Reichert he led the conception and direction of the Karlsruhe Bob Dylan Festival "Beethoven listens to Bob Dylan". Among his awards are the Berliner Kunstpreis in the music category and the Villa Massimo (1979) as well as the scholarship of the Internationales Künstlerhaus Villa Concordia (1998) in Bamberg.

From 2007 until his retirement in 2014, von Dadelsen worked as a music teacher at the Hegau-Gymnasium Singen, where he also led the Big Band. Von Dadelsen lived in Wendland in Clenze.

== Awards ==
Among his awards are the Berliner Kunstpreis in the music category and the Villa Massimo (1979) as well as the scholarship of the Internationales Künstlerhaus Villa Concordia (1998) in Bamberg.

- 1979 Rom Preis Villa Massimo
- 1979 Berliner Kunstpreis (Sparte Musik)
- 1979 Preis der Jürgen-Ponto-Stiftung
- 1981 Kunstpreis der Steinbrenner-Stiftung
- 1998 Villa Concordia-Stipendium

== Work ==
=== Vocal music ===
- Without-Out Songs for mixed choir (1980)
- Chagall for mixed choir (2005)

=== Stage music ===
- Ikarus (after García Márquez; with Babette Koblenz; 1989; 1990 Munich)
- Cinema, Musiktheater / Videooper; with B. Koblenz (1999/2001; 2002 Karlsruhe)

=== Instrumental music ===
- I. Orchestra work
  - Zwischenräume for grand orchestra (1972/73)
  - Plastik-Melancholie for grand orchestra (1975/76)
  - Sentimental Journey for chamber orchestra or 10 instruments (1978)
  - Salto Mortale for String orchestra and Revolver (1979)
  - Fuga Revuelta for chamber orchestra or 17 instrument. (1991)
  - Eau for chamber orchestra (2002/03)
- II. Pieces for Ensemble
  - 27 Geschichten, wie sie auch unter blauem Himmel passieren können for 5 Instruments. (1973)
  - Made in Germany for 6 instruments. (197
  - Just Birds Flying in an Airplane for 7 instruments (1981)
  - Kamel for 9 instruments. (1988) ▫ Esel for S, B u. 11 Instruments.(1989)
  - Zebra für 11 Instr. (1992) ▫ suburb, subterranean for Mez and 5 instruments. (2001)
- III. Chamber music
  - Selbstbildnis im Supermarkt for viol. and piano. (1975/77)
  - First Trumpet for viol. and piano. (1983/86)
  - Duo for viol. and trumpet. (1989)
  - Karakoram for String quartet (1994)
  - Westsüdwest for Alto saxophone and piano. (1996)
  - Blowin’ for String quartet (1999)
- IV. Solo pieces
  - Drei Klavierstücke (1969)
  - Klavierstücke I –II (1979, 1990)
  - Studien für Viol. (1988, 1993)
  - Nordnordost for Altsax. (1994)

=== Audio plays ===
- Blowing through the letters for Akk, Kl, Str. Qu. and tape (1999)
- Von der Wirklichkeit hinter den Grenzen (with Manfred Reichert), for Akk., Kl, Str. Qu. and tape (2007)

== Publications ==
- Was macht Dionysos im Matriarchat? Essay zum aktuellen Komponieren (in Neue Zeitschrift für Musik, 1/1979)
- Eine neue Stufe rhythmischer Wechselwirkungen (in Ästhetik und Komposition, Mainz 1994)
- Entropie und Systemsprung im musikalischen Organismus (in Ästhetik und Selbst-organisation, Berlin 1993)
- Rhythmische Wechselwirkungskräfte – Musikalische Indizien der Chaostheorie?(in Arbeitsprozesse in Physik und Musik, Berlin 1993)
- Bob (D)ylan oder die Umkehr von Bab-Ylon (in MELOS, Heft 4/1984)
- Einstein, Dylan und der Gesang der Synagoge (in der Kulturzeitschrift „du“, Mai 2001)
- Maskierter Kult und demaskierte Kultur. Steve Reich: Tehillim (in MELOS, Heft 1/1987)
- Diesseits und jenseits von Raum und Zeit: Steve Reichs „Different Trains“ (in Nachgedachte Musik der Gegenwart I, 1995, Wolke-Verlag)
- Über die musikalischen Konturen der Entfernung (zu „Lontano“ in Melos/NZ, 3/1976); Vom Pathos des Individuellen und seiner Demaskierung (zu „San Francisco Polyphony“, 1977, Wergo)
- Entgrenzung und Besinnung statt Bekränzung und Bestimmung—Wilhelm Killmayers Hölderlin-Zyklus (in „Wilhelm Killmayer“ ed. by Künste 11 November 1998), veröffentl. in Jahrbuch der Bayerischen Akademie 1998 und andere.
