= St. Thomas Church Square =

Square in Leipzig, Germany

Thomaskirchhof St. Thomas Church Square
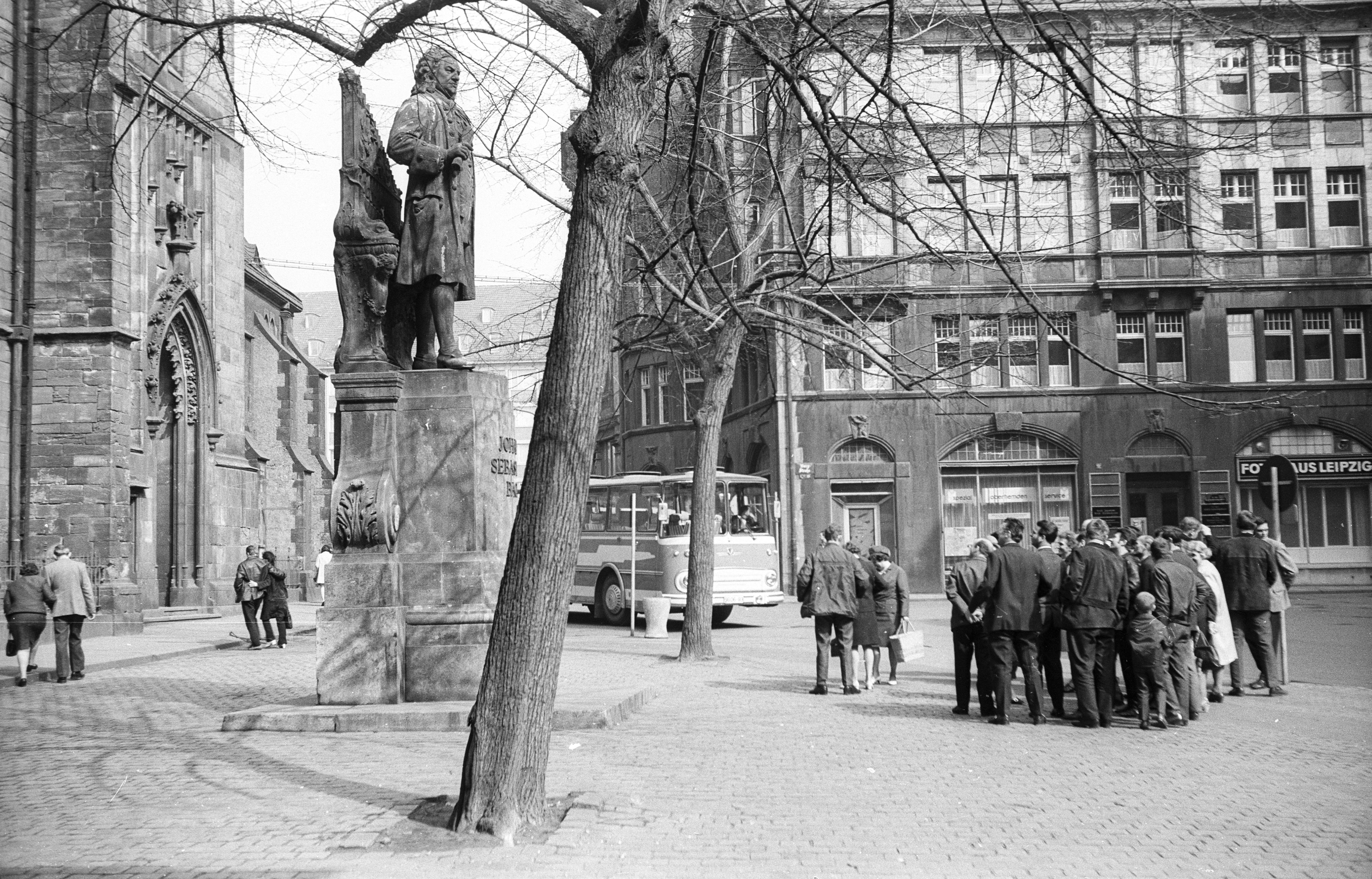
- Statue of J. S. Bach on the square, in 1971
- Interactive map of Thomaskirchhof; St. Thomas Church Square
- Length: 115 m (377 ft)
- Width: 90 m (300 ft)
- Location: Leipzig-Mitte, Leipzig, Germany
- Postal code: 04109
- Coordinates: 51°20′22″N 12°22′24″E

The St. Thomas Church Square, Thomaskirchhof, is a square in the city centre of Leipzig, Germany. At its centre is the St. Thomas Church, Thomaskirche.

== Name and history ==
The square is named after the former cemetery around the St. Thomas Church built in 1212. In front of the south portal of the church is a 1908 statue of Johann Sebastian Bach by Carl Seffner. On Thomaskirchhof 16 is the Leipzig Bach Museum with the Bach Archive.

== Description ==
St. Thomas Church Square surrounds the St. Thomas Church on three sides (north, east and south). On the outside of the square there are streets with the address Thomaskirchhof. To the west the Dittrichring as part of the Promenadenring and the Inner City Ring Road closes off the square. The streets called Klostergasse, Thomasgasse and Burgstrasse lead into St. Thomas Church Square. The square has an east–west extension of around 115 m (377 ft) and is around 90 m (295 ft) wide on the west side. In the southeast corner buildings extend into the rectangle of the square. The resulting small, intimate section, measuring around 23 m (75 ft) by 36 m (118 ft), with the Statue of J. S. Bach south of the church is often mistakenly considered to be the entire St. Thomas Church Square. In the northern part of the square is the descent to the underground car park beneath the Marktgalerie.

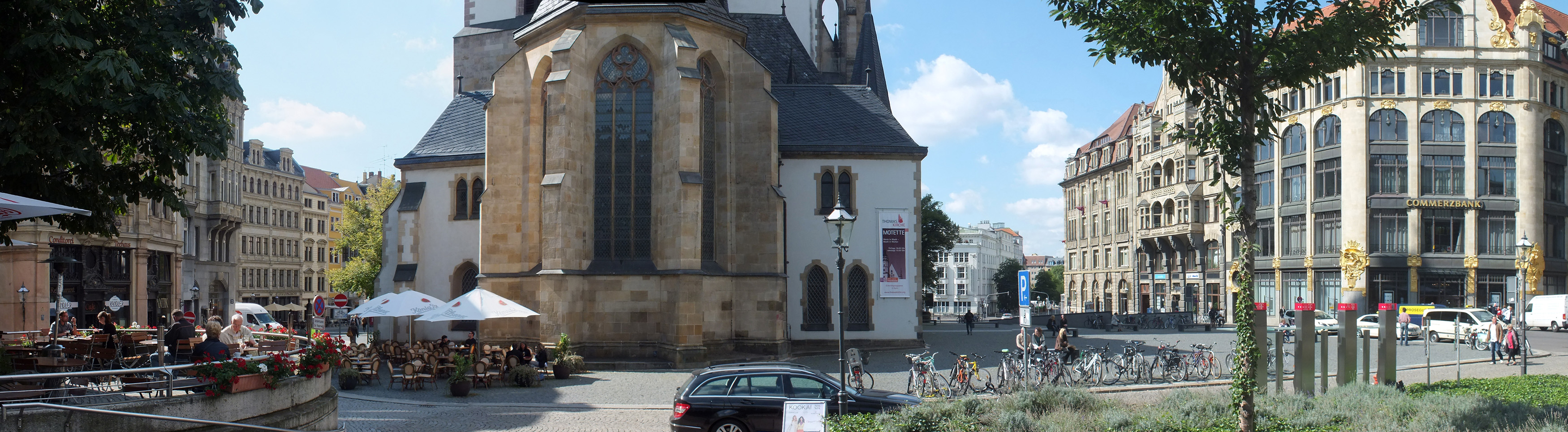
The square in 2012

== Tourist spot ==
The southern part with the entrance to the St. Thomas Church, the Bach monument, the Bach Museum and the minimalistic modern Thomas Shop (architects: HPP) is one of the most important tourist spots in Leipzig. In the summer months, the square is also used for open-air concerts. The green area between St. Thomas Church Square and the Markt is a popular recreational area in the centre of the city.
