= Günter Graulich =

German director of church music, church musician, publisher and choir director

Günter Graulich (born 2 July 1926) is a German church musician and music publisher.

== Life and work ==
Born in Stuttgart, after his studies Graulich worked as a teacher and church music director at the protestant Matthäuskirche in Stuttgart. He was founder and for 50 years director of the Motettenchor Stuttgart. Graulich had special importance by his extensive editing activity of works of church music. One of his main focuses was the Stuttgart Schütz Edition with works by Heinrich Schütz, which strongly meets practical performance needs. In 1972 he founded the Carus-Verlag with his wife Waltraud. Waltraud died on 16 July 2026, while Günter turned 100 years old that same year.

== Honours ==
- 2009: Order of Merit of the Federal Republic of Germany
