= Johann Sebastian Bach Institute =

German research institute

The Johann Sebastian Bach Institute (German: Johann-Sebastian-Bach-Institut) was an institute dedicated to Johann Sebastian Bach in Göttingen, Germany. It was founded in 1951 as one of two institutes preparing the New Bach Edition, the second complete edition of the composer's works. The partner organisation was the Leipzig Bach Archive in what was then East Germany on the other side of the Iron Curtain from Göttingen. The new edition met rigorous scientific requirements and at the same time served musical practice.

The institute ended its activities in 2006 and the final volume of the New Bach Edition set appeared the following year. However, the Bach Archive Leipzig remains active and has issued revisions of some single volumes.

== Directors ==
- 1951–1961: Hans Albrecht
- 1961–1962: Wilhelm Martin Luther
- 1962–1993: Georg von Dadelsen
- 1993–2006: Martin Staehelin
