= Walter Gerstenberg =

German musicologist

Walter Gerstenberg (26 December 1904 in Hildesheim – 26 October 1988 in Tübingen) was a German musicologist and an expert on Johann Sebastian Bach, Wolfgang Amadeus Mozart and Franz Schubert.

== Publications ==
- Die Klavierkompositionen Domenico Scarlattis. Schiele, Regensburg 1931; also as (Forschungsarbeiten des Musikwissenschaftlichen Instituts der Universität Leipzig. Volume 2, ZDB-ID 2280273-3). Bosse, Regensburg 1933 (in addition, music supplement in special issue; at the same time: Leipzig, University, thesis, 1931).
- as editor with Heinrich Husmann and Harald Heckmann: Bericht über den internationalen musikwissenschaftlichen Kongreß Hamburg 1956. Bärenreiter, Kassel among others 1957, OCLC 923543745.
- as editor with Jan LaRue and Wolfgang Rehm: Festschrift Otto Erich Deutsch zum 80. Geburtstag am 5. September 1963. Bärenreiter, Kassel atc. 1963, Literature by and about Walter Gerstenberg in the German National Library catalogue (with Bibliography).

== Bibliography ==
- Georg von Dadelsen, Andreas Holschneider (editor): Festschrift Walter Gerstenberg zum 60. Geburtstag. Möseler, Wolfenbüttel etc. 1964.
- Michael Buddrus, Sigrid Fritzlar: Die Professoren der Universität Rostock im Dritten Reich. Ein biographisches Lexikon (Texte und Materialien zur Zeitgeschichte. vol. 16). K. G. Saur Verlag, Munich 2007, ISBN 978-3-598-11775-6, p. 160–161.
