= Carus-Verlag =

German music publisher

- Founded: 1972
- Founder: Günter and Waltraud Graulich
- Country of origin: Germany
- Headquarters location: Stuttgart
- Publication types: Sheet music
- Official website: www.carus-verlag.com

Carus-Verlag is a German music publisher founded in 1972 and based in Stuttgart.

Carus was founded by choral conductor Günter Graulich and his wife Waltraud with an emphasis on choral repertoire. As of January 2016 the catalogue includes more than 26,000 works.

The company produces the standard editions of the complete works of Josef Rheinberger and Max Reger.

== Record label ==
The company also produces CDs to accompany some of its printed editions. Currently the publishers are working on recordings accompanying the complete editions of Wilhelm Friedemann Bach. Opera rarities include Schubert's Sakuntala and Johann Rudolf Zumsteeg's Die Geisterinsel.
