= Matthias Herrmann =

German musicologist and university professor

Matthias Herrmann (born 14 October 1955) is a German musicologist and university professor.

== Life ==
Born in Mildenau, Herrmann became a member of the Dresdner Kreuzchor conducted by Kreuzkantor Rudolf Mauersberger, later Martin Flämig. He then studied musicology at the University of Leipzig and later became a staff member of the music department of the Saxon State Library in Dresden as well as of the cultural editorial staff of the Sächsisches Tageblatt.

He wrote his doctorate about the court-music of the House of Wettin in Dresden around 1500 and was habilitated on compositional work, especially the early work of Rudolf Mauersberger. He worked as a scientific assistant and senior assistant at the Heinrich-Schütz-Archiv in Dresden and was appointed to a professorship for music history at the Institute for Musicology of the Hochschule für Musik Carl Maria von Weber Dresden in 1993.

He has published the series Sächsische Studien zur älteren Musikgeschichte at the Klaus-Jürgen Kamprad publishing house in Altenburg, and the Dresdner Schriften zur Musik and the Schriften des Dresdner Kreuzchores at the Tectum publishing house in Marburg and Baden-Baden.

Herrmann is a member of the editorial board of the Dresdner Hefte and a board member of the Dresdner Geschichtsverein, where he served as chairman until 2016). He was spokesman of the association "Heinrich Schütz in Dresden", and a longstanding member of the cultural advisory board of the state capital Dresden.

== Publications ==
- Rudolf Mauersberger (1889–1971). Werkverzeichnis (RMWV), Dresden 1976, 2., completely revised edition, Dresden / Stuttgart 1991 (Studien und Materialien zur Musikgeschichte Dresdens 3)
- Rudolf Mauersberger (1889–1971). Protokoll der Wissenschaftlichen Konferenz anläßlich des 100. Geburtstages des Kreuzkantors. (edited with Hans John), Dresdner Hefte 1990, Heft 2 (Beiträge zur Kulturgeschichte 22)
- Die Dresdner Kirchenmusik im 19. und 20. Jahrhundert. (editor), Laaber 1998 (Musik in Dresden 3), ISBN 3-89007-331-X.
- Dresden und die avancierte Musik im 20. Jahrhundert. Part I: 1900–1933 (edited with Hanns-Werner Heister), Laaber 1999 (Musik in Dresden 4)
- Arnold Schönberg in Dresden, Dresden 2001
- Wolfram Steude, Annäherung durch Distanz. Texte zur älteren mitteldeutschen Musik und Musikgeschichte (editor), Altenburg Kamprad 2001
- Richard Strauss. Essays zu Leben und Werk. (edited with Michael Heinemann und Stefan Weiss), Laaber 2002.
- Dresden und die avancierte Musik im 20. Jahrhundert. Part II: 1933–1966 (edited with Hanns-Werner Heister), Laaber 2002 (Musik in Dresden 5)
- Dresden und die avancierte Musik im 20. Jahrhundert. Part III: 1966–1999 (edited with Stefan Weiss), Laaber 2004 (Musik in Dresden 6)
- Kreuzkantor zu Dresden. Rudolf Mauersberger, vol. 1 der Schriften des Mauersberger-Museums, Mauersberg 2004
- Der Dresdner Kreuzchor. Geschichte, Wirkungsstätten, Schule. (edited with Dieter Härtwig), Leipzig 2006
- Märchenoper. Ein europäisches Phänomen. (edited with Vitus Froesch), Dresden 2007
- Musik im mittelalterlichen Dresden. Vom Werden einer Musikstadt. (editor), Altenburg Kamprad 2008 (Sächsische Studien zur älteren Musikgeschichte 1)
- Die Musikpflege in der evangelischen Schlosskapelle zu Dresden zur Schütz-Zeit (editor), Altenburg Kamprad 2009 (Sächsische Studien zur älteren Musikgeschichte 3)
- Erkundungen zu Günter Raphael – Mensch und Komponist (editor), Altenburg Kamprad 2010
- Johann Walter: Torgau und die evangelische Kirchenmusik. With a foreword by Christian Thielemann (editor), Altenburg 2013 (Sächsische Studien zur älteren Musikgeschichte, vol. 4)
- Rudolf Mauersberger: Aus der Werkstatt eines Kreuzkantors. Briefe, Texte, Reden (editor), Marburg 2014 (Schriften des Dresdner Kreuzchores, vol. 1)
- Wolfram Steude: Heinrich Schütz – Mensch, Werk, Wirkung. With a foreword by Joshua Rifkin (editor), Marburg 2016 (Dresdner Schriften zur Musik, vol. 7)
- Dresdner Kreuzchor und zeitgenössische Chormusik. Ur- und Erstaufführungen zwischen Richter und Kreile (editor), Marburg 2017 (Schriften des Dresdner Kreuzchores, vol. 2)
