= Walburga Litschauer =

Austrian musicologist

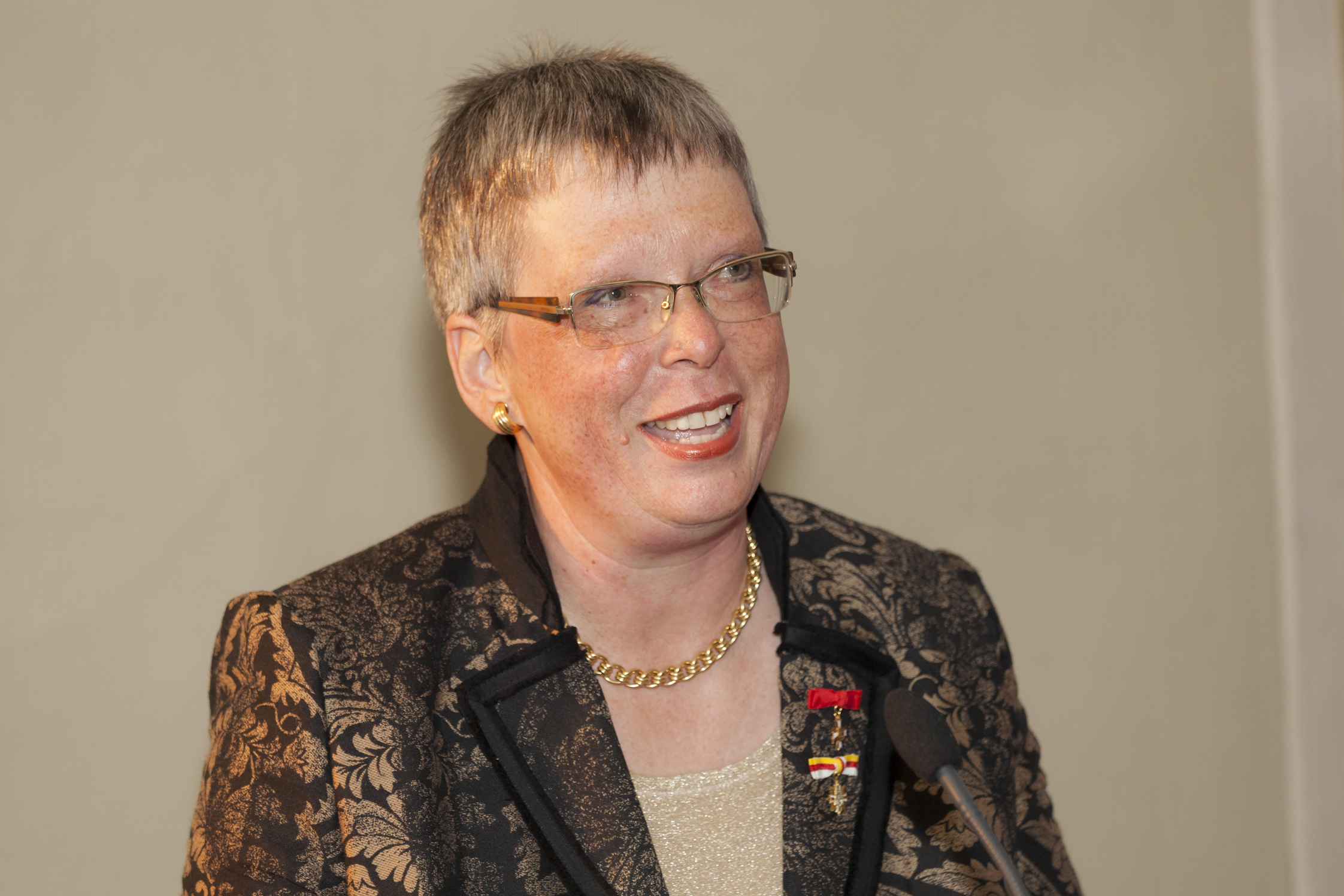
Walburga Litschauer

Walburga Litschauer (born 15 October 1954) is an Austrian musicologist and Franz Schubert scholar.

== Life ==
Born in Klagenfurt, Carinthia, Litschauer studied music and theatre studies at the University of Vienna and completed piano training at the Music and Arts University of the City of Vienna. In 1979, she passed the State examination in piano, in 1980 she received her doctorate and in 2005 her habilitation at the University of Vienna. In 2015, the professional title "Professor" was conferred on her.

Litschauer was initially a contributor to the Anton Bruckner Complete Edition. Since 1980, she has headed the Vienna office of the New Schubert Edition at the Austrian Academy of Sciences, and since 1990 she has been a member of the editorial board. From 1990 to 1995, she was the editor of the Musicologica austriaca.

Litschauer is a member of the board of directors of domestic and foreign scientific societies, from 1998 to 2012 she was president of the Austrian Music Society, from 2004 she was deputy chairwoman of the Carinthischer Sommer festival, from 2010 to 2016 its chairwoman.

== Prizes and awards ==
- Recognition Prize "Grand Prix Franz Schubert" for exceptional achievements in the field of Schubert research, 1992.
- Grand Decoration of Honour of the Province of Carinthia and Austrian Cross of Honour for Science and Art, 2008.
- Werner Welzig Award of the Austrian Academy of Sciences, 2013.
- Honorary member of the International Schubert Society, 2014
- Awarded the professional title professor, 2015.

== Conference conception and organisation ==
- "Music and Music Research in Carinthia", Symposium, Ossiach (in the framework of the "Carinthian Summer"), 29 June 1989.
- "Schubert and his Friends", International Schubert Conference, Vienna, 22–26 May 1997 (together with Eva Badura-Skoda, Carmen Ottner and Gerold Gruber).
- First International Workshop on Schubert Reception, Vienna, Austrian Music Society, 12–17 May 2003 (together with Gernot Gruber and Michael Kube).
- "Brahms' Schubert-Rezeption im Wiener Kontext", International Symposium in cooperation with the Musicological Institute of Kiel University and the Gesellschaft der Musikfreunde in Wien, Musikverein, Vienna, 12–13 September 2013 (together with Otto Biba, Ingrid Fuchs, Gernot Gruber, Katharina Loose and Siegfried Oechsle).
- "Representation and Staging. Carinthian Water Music - Once and Now", symposium, Carinthian State Archives Klagenfurt, Festsaal, 9 June 2016 (organised by Carinthian Summer).

== Publications ==
=== Independent writings ===
- Studies on the Italian Lied in Vienna during the Classical period (1750-1820). Diss. phil. Vienna 1980 (mschr.).
- Schubert and the pleasure of dancing. Vienna 1997 (with Walter Deutsch).
- Schubert's late works for piano four hands. Vienna 2013 (CD with scholarly booklet).

=== Editions ===
==== Editions of music ====
===== Anton Bruckner Complete Edition =====
- Works for piano two hands (Vol. XII/2), Vienna 1988. Second, improved edition (with revision report), Vienna 2000.
- Works for piano four hands (Vol. XII/3), Vienna 1994.
- Abendklänge for violin and piano (Volume XII/7), Vienna 1995.

===== Monuments of Musical Art in Austria =====
- "In questa tomba oscura", Giuseppe Carpani's poetry in 68 settings. (Vol. 140/141), Vienna 1986.

===== New Mozart Edition =====
- Kritischer Bericht zu Serie I: Geistliche Gesangswerke, Werkgruppe 1, Abteilung 2: Requiem. Kassel 2007 [together with Dietrich Berke and Christoph Wolff].

===== New Schubert Edition =====
- Overtures for piano four hands (Series VII/1, Volume 5), Kassel 1984.
- Critical report on the volume "Overtures for piano four hands" (Series VII/1, Volume 5), Tübingen 1989.
- Dances I (Series VII/2, Volume 6), Kassel 1989.
- Dances II (Series VII/2, Volume 7a), Kassel 1990.
- Melodic Register to Schubert's Dances (Series VII/2, Volume 7b), Kassel 1992 [together with Walter Deutsch].
- Piano Sonatas III (Series VII/2, Volume 3), Kassel 1996.
- Piano Sonatas I (Series VII/2, Volume 1), Kassel 2000.
- Critical report on the opera Des Teufels Lustschloß (series II/1), Tübingen 2003 [together with Christine Martin and Uta Hertin-Loeser].
- Piano Sonatas II (Series VII/2, Volume 2), Kassel 2003.
- Critical report on Piano Sonatas III (Series VII/2, Volume 3), Tübingen 2004.
- Critical report on Piano Sonatas II (Series VII/2, Volume 2), Tübingen 2004.
- Critical report on Piano Sonatas I (Series VII/2, Volume 1), Tübingen 2005.
- Critical report on Dances II (Series VII/2, Volume 7a), Tübingen 2007.
- Works for piano four hands I (Series VII/1, Vol. 1), Kassel 2007.
- Werke für Klavier zu vier Händen III (Serie VII/1, vol. 3), Kassel 2011 (with Werner Aderhold).
- Critical report on Werke für Klavier zu vier Händen I (Series VII/1, Volume 1), Tübingen 2012.
- Critical report on Werke für Klavier zu vier Händen III (Serie VII/1, Band 3), Tübingen 2012 [with Werner Aderhold].
- Critical report on Werke für Klavier zu vier Händen: Tänze I (Series VII/2, Vol. 6), Tübingen 2014.

==== Original text editions ====
- Schubert. Sonata in B flat (D 960), Kassel 2013.
- Schubert. Works for piano four hands III, Kassel 2013 [with Werner Aderhold].
- Schubert. Sonata in A (D 959), Kassel 2014.
- Schubert. Sonata in c (D 958), Kassel 2015.
- Schubert. Sonata in G (D 894), Kassel 2018.

==== Text editions ====
- New Documents on the Schubert Circle. From letters and diaries of his friends. Volume 1: Ferdinand Mayerhofer von Grünbühel. Vienna 1986.
- New Documents on the Schubert Circle. From letters and diaries of his friends. Volume 2: Documents on the life of Anna von Revertera. Vienna 1993.

=== Editorship, editorial activity ===
- Franz Schubert. Jahre der Krise 1818–1823. Bericht über das Symposium Kassel, 30 September until 1 October 1982. Arnold Feil zum 60. Geburtstag. Kassel etc. 1985 [together with Werner Aderhold and Walther Dürr].
- Leopold Nowak: Über Anton Bruckner. Gesammelte Aufsätze. Vienna 1985.
- Musicologica austriaca. 10–13 (1991–1995).
- Walther Dürr: Zeichen-Setzung. Aufsätze zur musikalischen Poetik. Kassel 1992 [with Werner Aderhold].
- Schubert und seine Freunde. Konferenzbericht der Internationalen Schubert-Konferenz Wien 1997, Vienna 1999 [together with Eva Badura-Skoda, Gerold W. Gruber and Carmen Ottner].
- Schubert-Jahrbuch 1997 (Bericht über den Internationalen Schubert-Kongreß Duisburg 1997, Teil I: Lieder und Gesänge, geistliche Werke). Duisburg 1999 [together with Dietrich Berke, Walther Dürr und Christiane Schumann].
- Schubert-Jahrbuch 1998 (Bericht über den Internationalen Schubert-Kongreß Duisburg 1997, Teil II: Bühnen- und Orchesterwerke, Kammer- und Klaviermusik). Duisburg 2000 [together with Dietrich Berke, Walther Dürr und Christiane Schumann].
- Schubert-Jahrbuch 1999 (Bericht über den Internationalen Schubert-Kongreß Duisburg 1997, Teil III: Ästhetik, Rezeption und Methodenfragen). Duisburg 2001 [together with Dietrich Berke, Walther Dürr und Christiane Schumann].
- Schubert und das Biedermeier. Beiträge zur Musik des frühen 19. Jahrhunderts. Festschrift für Walther Dürr zum 70. Geburtstag. Kassel 2002 [together with Michael Kube and Werner Aderhold].
- Schubert und die Nachwelt. I. Internationale Arbeitstagung zur Schubert-Rezeption Wien 2003. Kongressbericht. München 2007 [together with Michael Kube and Gernot Gruber].

Litschauer also wrote over 50 essays on musicological questions as well as encyclopaedia articles.
