= Christian Weinlig =

Christian Weinlig may refer to two German composers:

- Christian Ehregott Weinlig (1743–1813)
- Christian Theodor Weinlig (1780–1842), nephew of the former
