= Horst Dietrich Preuss =

German theologian

Horst Dietrich Preuß
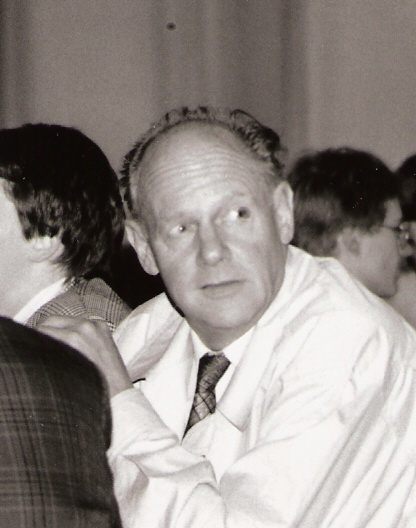
- Born: 1 May 1927
- Died: 25 December 1993 (aged 66)
- Occupation: University teacher, Protestant theologian, biblical scholar
- Employer: Augustana Divinity School (1973–1992); University of Göttingen

Horst Dietrich Preuß (1 May 1927 – 25 December 1993 in Neuendettelsau) was a German Protestant theologian, Lutheran pastor, and professor of Old Testament at the University of Göttingen and from 1973 to 1992 at Augustana Divinity School in Neuendettelsau.

== Education ==
Preuss earned his habilitation on 29 October 1969 at the Faculty of Theology of the University of Göttingen.

== Life and work ==
Preuß was first a pastor in Laatzen and from 1963 to 1971 a lecturer in Old Testament at the Celle Theological Academy (formerly: Pfarrvikarseminar) of the Evangelical Lutheran Church of Hanover.

Later he was an Old Testament lecturer at the University of Göttingen. From there he moved to the Augustana University in Neuendettelsau in 1973. From 1973 to 1992 Professor of Old Testament at the Augustana-Hochschule Neuendettelsau.

== Selected publications ==
- Preuß, Horst Dietrich (1954). Taschen-Tutor Altes Testament (in German). Göttingen. ASIN B0000BMHOB.
- Preuß, Horst Dietrich (1954). Maria bei Luther. Schriften des Vereins für Reformationsgeschichte (in German). Vol. 172. Gütersloh, C. Bertelsmann. OCLC 7141794.
- Preuß, Horst Dietrich (1966). Jahweglaube und Zukunftserwartung. Beiträge zur Wissenschaft vom Alten und Neuen Testament (BWANT) (in German). Kiel: Kohlhammer. ISBN 978-3-17-022351-6. OCLC 707378405.
- Preuß, Horst Dietrich (1969). Verspottung fremder Religionen im Alten Testament (Habilitationsschrift--Göttingen). Beiträge zur Wissenschaft vom Alten und Neuen Testament, Folge 5 (in German). Göttingen. OCLC 749370.
- Preuß, Horst Dietrich (1976). Deuterojesaja: e. Einf. in seine Botschaft (in German). Neukirchen-Vluyn: Neukirchener Verlag. ISBN 9783788704964. OCLC 3069147.
- Preuß, Horst Dietrich (1978). Eschatologie im Alten Testament. Wege der Forschung (in German). Vol. 480. Darmstadt: Wissenschaftliche Buchgesellschaft. ISBN 9783534070367. OCLC 4460248.
- Preuß, Horst Dietrich (1982). Deuteronomium. Erträge der Forschung (in German). Vol. 164. Darmstadt: Wissenschaftliche Buchgesellschaft. ISBN 9783534072668. OCLC 8760005.
- Preuß, Horst Dietrich; Augustana-Hochschule (Neuendettelsau, Germany) (1983). Erfahrung-- Glaube-- Theologie: Beiträge zu Bedeutung und Ort religiöser Erfahrung (in German). Stuttgart: Calwer. ISBN 9783766807212. OCLC 13060773.
- Preuß, Horst Dietrich (1984). Das Alte Testament in christlicher Predigt (in German). Stuttgart: Kohlhammer. ISBN 978-3170085862. OCLC 12387203.
- Preuß, Horst Dietrich; Hausmann, Jutta; Zobel, Hans-Jürgen (1992). Alttestamentlicher Glaube und biblische Theologie (in German). Stuttgart: Verlag W. Kohlhammer. ISBN 9783170110793. OCLC 26236074.
- Preuß, Horst Dietrich (1991). Theologie des Alten Testaments (in German). Stuttgart: Verlag W. Kohlhammer. ISBN 9783170110755. OCLC 25128627.
  - Teología del Antiguo Testamento, Bilbao.
  - Old Testament theology, Edinburgh und Louisville, Ky.
- Preuß, Horst Dietrich (1980). Bibelkunde des Alten und Neuen Testaments. UTB (in German). Vol. 887. Heidelberg (& Klaus Berger): Quelle & Meyer. ISBN 9783494020976. OCLC 310640601.

== Literature ==
- Jutta Hausmann; Hans-Jürgen Zobel, eds. (1992). Alttestamentlicher Glaube und biblische Theologie Festschrift für Horst Dietrich Preuss zum 65. Geburtstag (in German). Stuttgart, Berlin and Köln: Kohlhammer Verlag. doi:10.1163/1568533972651658. ISBN 9783170110793. OCLC 214313365.
