= Ingrid Schmithüsen =

German soprano (1960–2026)

- Born: 18 February 1960; Aachen, North Rhine-Westphalia, West Germany
- Died: 6 March 2026 (aged 66)
- Occupation: Classical soprano
- Website: www.ingridschmithusen.org

Ingrid Schmithüsen (18 February 1960 – 6 March 2026) was a German soprano, who specialised in concert music and Lied recitals. She ran a series of recitals in Cologne and made recording, programming lieder around themes. She used her "pure and well-articulated" voice for intense individual interpretations. She worked in Baroque oratorios and recitals of Romantic music and first performances of new lieder. She collaborated with conductors including Sigiswald Kuijken, Philippe Herreweghe and Mazaaki Suzuki in international projects.

== Life and career ==
Schmithüsen was born in Aachen on 18 February 1960. She studied at the Hochschule für Musik und Tanz Köln with Gregory Foley and Dietrich Fischer-Dieskau. From Fischer-Dieskau she learned to focus on both poetry and music. She achieved prizes at competitions including Concours international des Maîtres du chant français in Paris in 1981 and Deutscher Musikrat in Berlin 1982. Her singing was described as with a pure voice, well-articulated, and with intense individual interpretation.

=== Medicine ===
Schmithüsen suffered a vocal crisis at age 30, causing her to interrupt her career. She studied medicine, and studied further homeopathy and violence-free communication after Marshall Rosenberg. She lectured in the field.

=== Lied ===
Schmithüsen focused on lied, in partnership with pianist Thomas Palm, achieving a repertoire of 4000 lieder over 27 years. They programmed them in a recital in a dramatic sequence, trying to achieve a coherence as in the song cycles by Schubert and Schumann, and to tell "eine ungehörte Geschichte" (an unheared story), as she worded it. She initiated an association running a concert series of recitals entitled "im zentrum lied" (Lied in focus) that she directed until 2019. She became then its honorary president. She made recordings of lieder selected around themes for the label Canterino.

=== Other music ===
Schmithüsen performed in a wide repertoire of Baroque oratorios, recitals of Romantic music and first performances of new lieder. In 1984 she appeared at the Schubertiade Hohenems. She collaborated with conductors including Sigiswald Kuijken and Philippe Herreweghe in international projects. She recorded Bach cantatas and his St John Passion with Masaaki Suzuki. She performed chamber music with the Cherubini Quartet, the Auryn Quartet, the Ensemble Modern and Musica Antiqua Köln. In Quebec, she appeared with the Orchestre Symphonique de Québec. She performed with the Société de musique contemporaine du Québec (SMCQ) conducted by Walter Boudreau, including at the Présences festival of Radio France in Paris in 1999. In 2000, a Bach Year, she toured Israel and Australia with the Windsbacher Knabenchor conducted by Karl-Friedrich Beringer. She recorded Telemann cantatas conducted by Hermann Max and his ensemble Das Kleine Konzert in 2007. In 2010 she participated singing in a school project of an opera, Die Mädchen von Theresienstadt, composed to a libretto that included texts that girls in the Theresienstadt concentration camp had written, set to music by David Paul Graham.

=== Personal life ===
Schmithüsen lived in Carignan, Quebec, Canada, with her husband Denys Bouliane who taught composition at the McGill University in Montreal. She suffered from amyotrophic lateral sclerosis for several years.

Schmithüsen died in Carignan on 6 March 2026, at the age of 66.
