= Kreuzkirche, Dresden =

Lutheran church in Dresden, Germany

Kreuzkirche
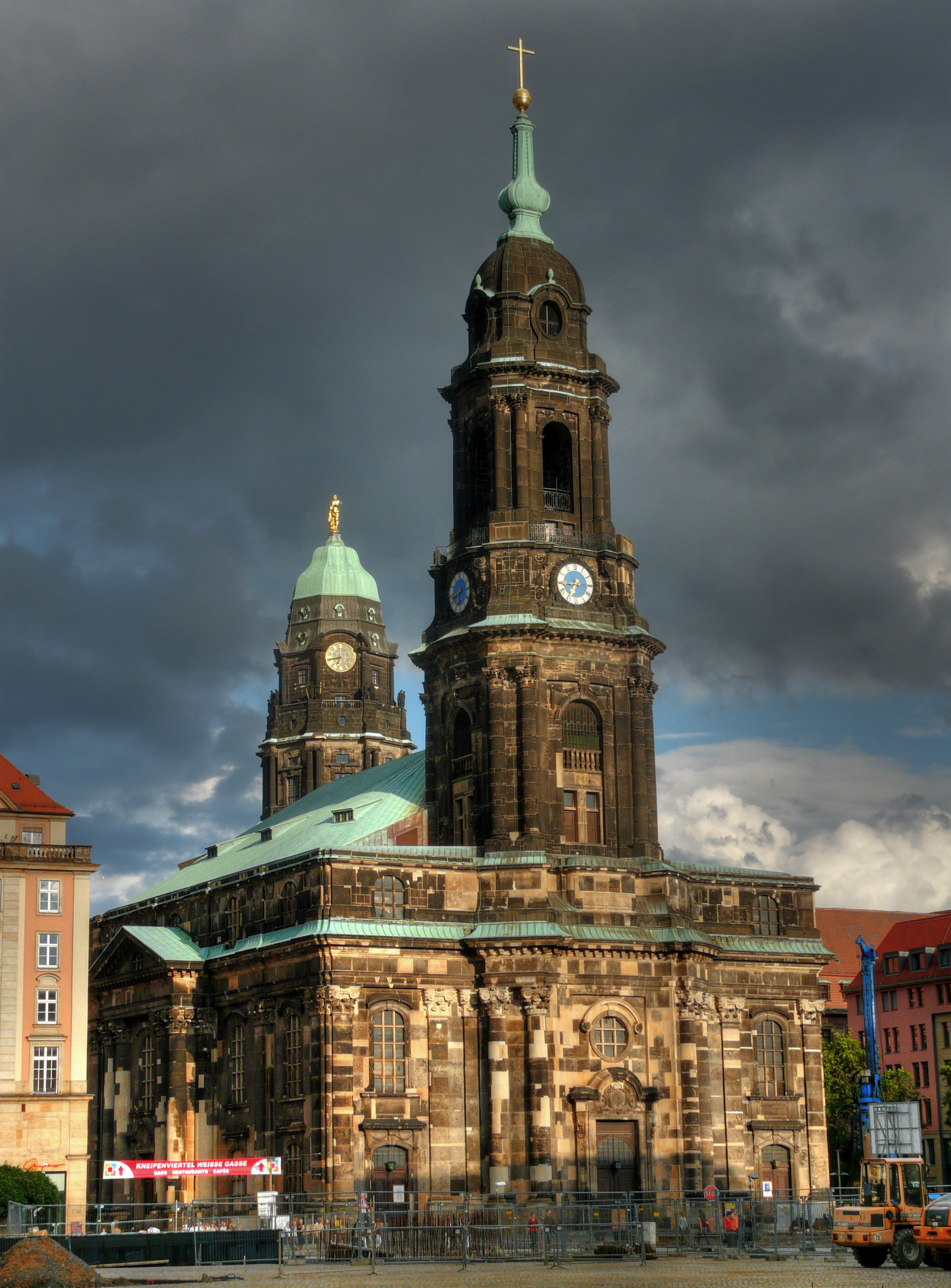
- Dresden Kreuzkirche (2008)

Religion
- Affiliation: Evangelical-Lutheran Church of Saxony
- Rite: Protestant
- Ecclesiastical or organisational status: Cathedral

Location
- Location: Dresden, Germany
- Interactive map of Kreuzkirche
- Coordinates: 51°2′56″N 13°44′21″E

Architecture
- Architect: Johann George Schmidt
- Style: Late Baroque; Neoclassicism
- Groundbreaking: 1764
- Completed: 1800

Website
- Official Website

The Dresden Kreuzkirche (Church of the Holy Cross) is a Lutheran church in Dresden, Germany. It is the main church and seat of the Landesbischof of the Evangelical-Lutheran Church of Saxony, and the largest church building in the Free State of Saxony. It also is home of the Dresdner Kreuzchor boys' choir.

== History ==
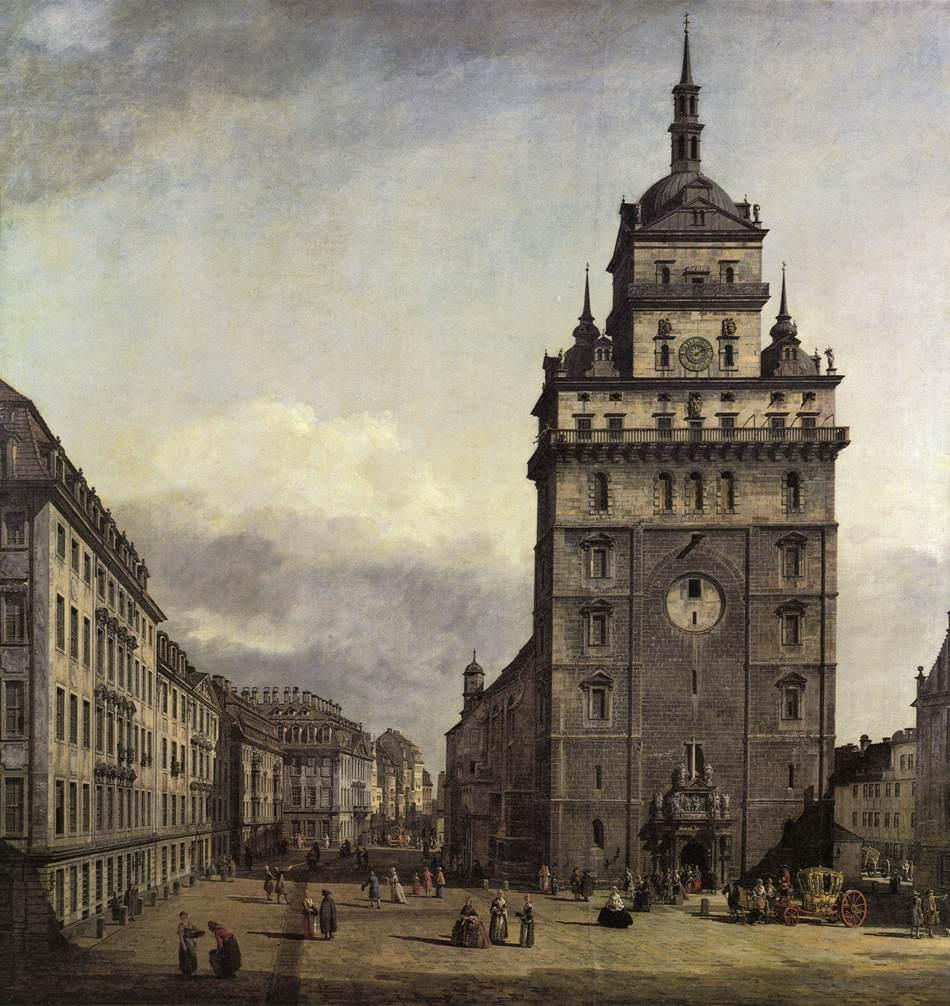
Old Church of the Cross, painting by Bernardo Bellotto, called Canaletto, c. 1750

(video) External and internal views of the church, December 2014

A Romanesque basilica dedicated to Saint Nicholas had existed at the southeastern corner of the Dresden market since the twelfth century. A side-chapel dedicated to the True Cross, named after a relic bequeathed by the Meissen margravine Constance of Babenberg (1212–1243), was first mentioned in 1319. Over the decades, it became the name of the whole church, which was officially dedicated on 10 June 1388 to the Holy Cross.

From 1401 it was rebuilt as a hall church with a prominent westwork in the German Sondergotik style. Based on the architectural works by Peter Parler (1330–1399), the construction later served as a model for numerous church buildings in Upper Saxony such as St. Anne's Church, Annaberg-Buchholz or St. Wolfgang's Church, Schneeberg. Finished about 1447/49, the church burned down in 1491, the first of five blazes over the next centuries. The Wettin electors of Saxony, residing at Dresden since 1464, had the Gothic hall church rebuilt, from 1499 under the architectural direction of Conrad Pflüger. From 1579 until 1584 the westwork was restored in a Renaissance style.

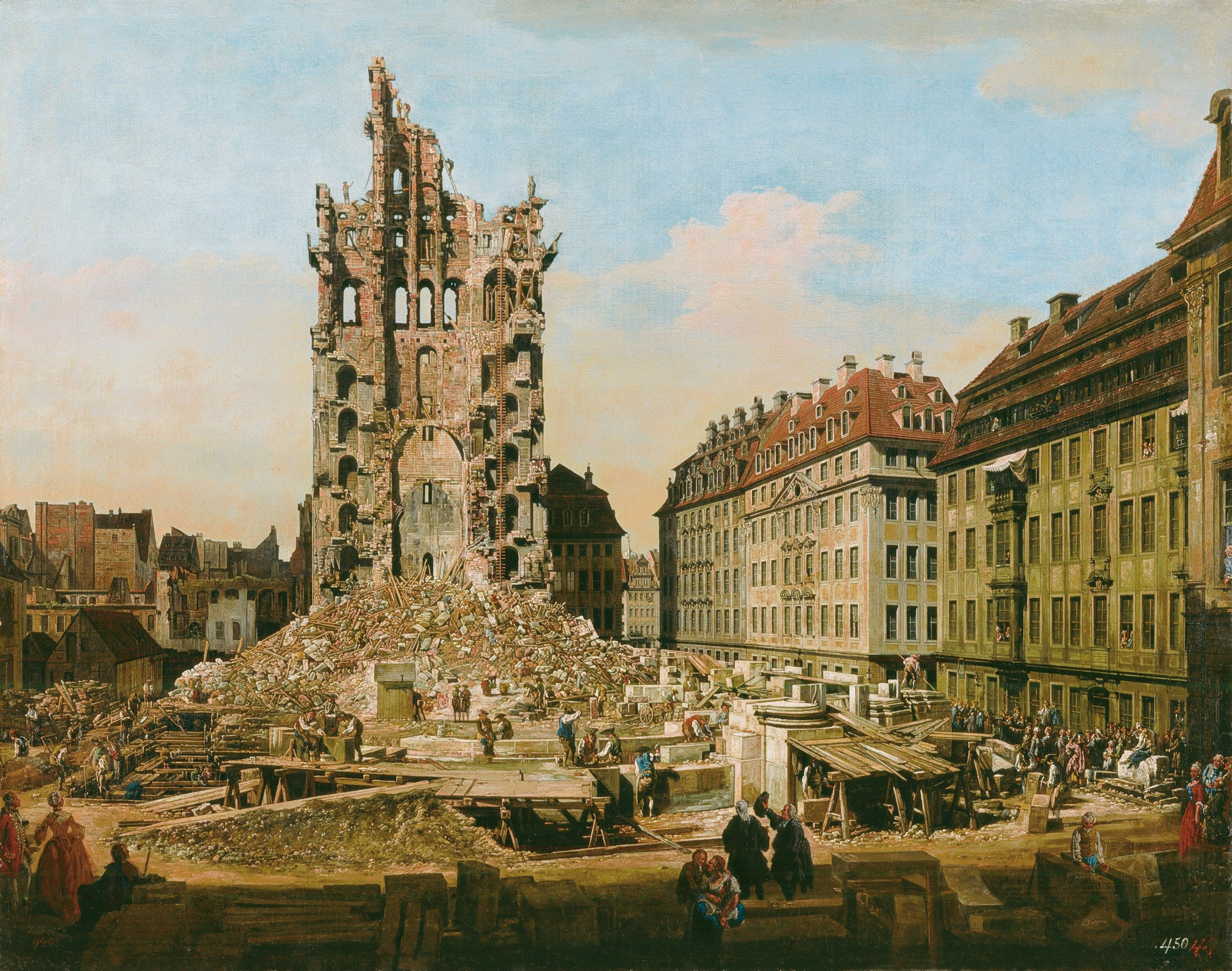
Old Church of the Cross, after the collapse of the Westwerk. Painting by Bernardo Bellotto, called Canaletto, c. 1765

The church was heavily damaged by Prussian cannonade during the Seven Years' War, with its Late Gothic choir almost completely destroyed. After the war, the Dresden master builder Johann George Schmidt (1707–1774) set up plans for a Baroque reconstruction, which however were opposed by contemporary architects of the Neoclassicist school following Zacharias Longuelune (1669–1748). Prince Francis Xavier of Saxony backed Schmidt and laid the foundation stone in 1764, nevertheless, after the preserved westwork collapsed in 1765, Schmidt had to accept the Neoclassicist chief architect Friedrich August Krubsacius (1718–1789) as adviser. Choir and steeple were accomplished in 1788, the new church was consecrated in 1792 and construction works finished in 1800.

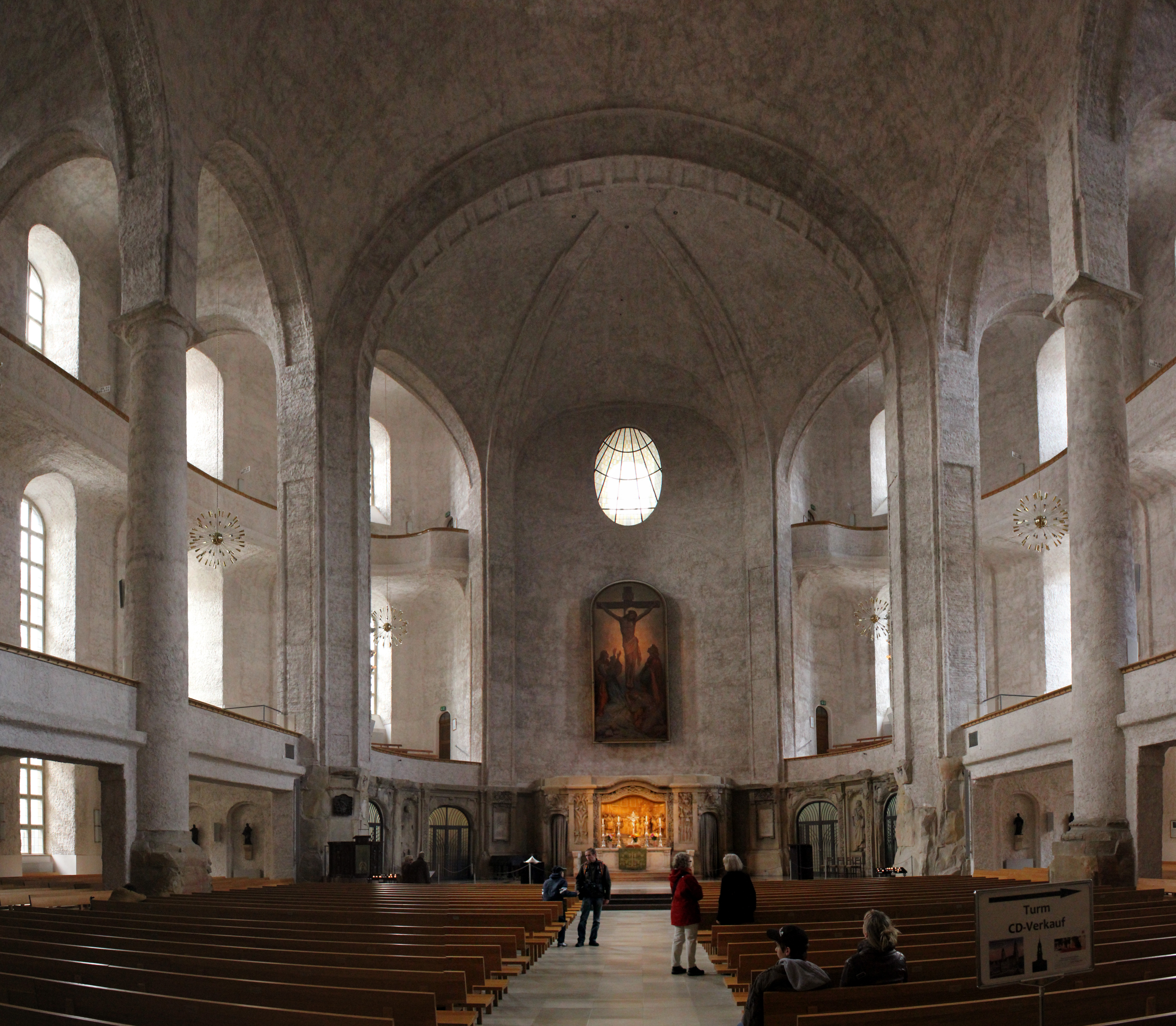
Interior in 2011

After the building was gutted by a fire in 1897, the church interior was reshaped with Art Nouveau (Jugendstil) elements according to plans designed by the Dresden architects Schilling & Graebner including works by Hans Hartmann-MacLean. The Church of the Cross was again set on fire during the bombing of Dresden on 13 February 1945. In its current form with its sober scratch coat interior, it was re-opened in 1955. In the course of the reconstruction of the nearby Frauenkirche a debate arose over a restoration of the pre-war design, but from 2000 to 2004, the interior was refurbished in its 1955 condition.

The director of the choir is known as the Kreuzkantor. Roderich Kreile is the twenty-eighth Kreuzkantor since the Reformation.

== Bells ==
The tower contains 5 bells including 2 bourdon bells, all cast by Franz Schilling, Apolda in 1899. The bells are located on 3 separate floors. On the top floor of the bell tower hangs the largest or bourdon bell, whose rib was modeled after the famous Gloriosa in Erfurt Cathedral. The middle floor hangs the smallest bells and the bottom floor hangs the medium bells. In Germany, the bells are always numbered from largest to smallest, Bell 1 is always the tenor or bourdon.

Two scythe bells for the quarter-hour and hourly chimes hang in the upper part of the tower and were cast in 1787.

Bell Number	Bell Name (German)	Bell Name (English)	mass
1	Kreuzglocke	Cross Bell (Bourdon)	11,511 kg
2	Bußglocke	Penitential Bell (2nd Bourdon)	6,825 kg
3	Kommunionglocke	Communion Bell	4,929 kg
4	Gebetsglocke	Prayer Bell	3,251 kg
5	Taufglocke	Baptismal Bell	1,947 kg

== Kreuzkantors ==
Since the Reformation:

- 1540–1553 Sebaldus Baumann
- 1553–1560 Johannes Selner
- 1560–1561 Andreas Lando
- 1561–1585 Andreas Petermann
- 1585–1586 Kaspar Füger
- 1586–1589 Basilius Köhler
- 1589–1606 Bartholomäus Petermann
- 1606–1612 Christoph Lisberger
- 1612–1615 Samuel Rüling
- 1615–1625 Christoph Neander
- 1625–1654 Michael Lohr
- 1654–1694 Jacob Beutel
- 1694–1713 Basilius Petritz
- 1713–1720 Johann Zacharias Grundig
- 1720–1755 Theodor Christlieb Reinhold
- 1755–1785 Gottfried August Homilius
- 1785–1813 Christian Ehregott Weinlig
- 10 August – 24 October 1813 Gottlob August Krille
- 1814–1817 Christian Theodor Weinlig
- 1818–1822 Hermann Uber
- 1822–1828 Friedrich Wilhelm Aghte
- 1828–1875 Ernst Julius Otto
- 1876–1906 Friedrich Oskar Wermann
- 1906–1930 Otto Richter
- 1930–1971 Rudolf Mauersberger
- 1971–1991 Martin Flämig
- 1991–1994 Gothart Stier
- 1994–1996 Matthias Jung (provisional)
- 1997–2022 Roderich Kreile
- 2022– Martin Lehmann

== Buried in the church ==
- Gregory of Heimburg

== Literature ==
- Karlheinz Blaschke: Dresden, Kreuzkirche, Kreuzschule, Kreuzchor – musikalische und humanistische Tradition in 775 Jahren. Gütersloh/München 1991, ISBN 3-570-06664-9
- Dieter Härtwig, Matthias Herrmann: Der Dresdner Kreuzchor – Geschichte und Gegenwart, Wirkungsstätten und Schule, Evangelische Verlagsanstalt Leipzig 2006, ISBN 3-374-02402-5
- Jürgen Helfricht: Dresdner Kreuzchor und Kreuzkirche. Eine Chronik von 1206 bis heute. Husum 2004, ISBN 3-89876-180-0
- Jürgen Helfricht: Dresden und seine Kirchen. Evangelische Verlagsanstalt Leipzig 2005, ISBN 3-374-02261-8
- Hans John: Der Dresdner Kreuzchor und seine Kantoren. Berlin 1987, ISBN 3-374-00177-7
