= Dresdner Kreuzchor =

Boys' choir in Dresden

- Choir
- Origin: Dresden, Saxony, Germany
- Music director: Martin Lehmann
- Headquarters: Kreuzkirche, Dresden
- Website: www.kreuzchor.de

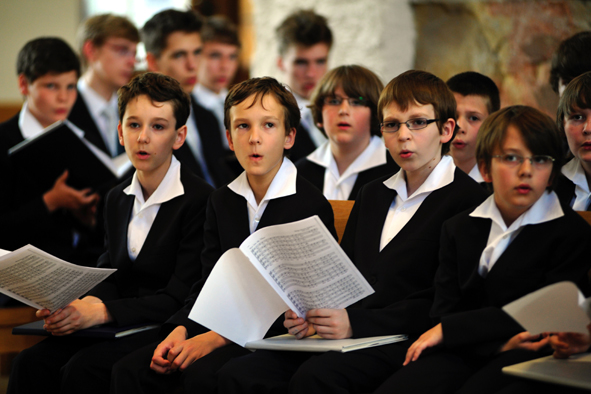
Dresdner Kreuzchor in 2012

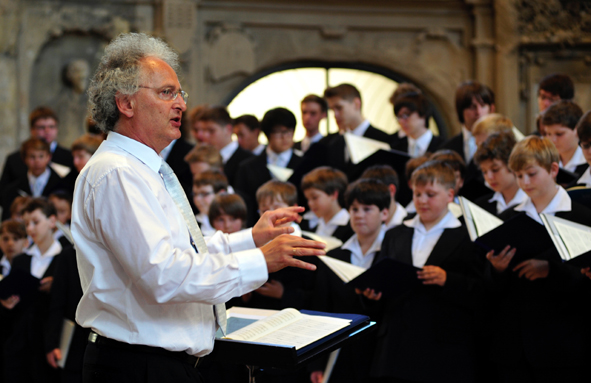
Roderich Kreile conducting the choir

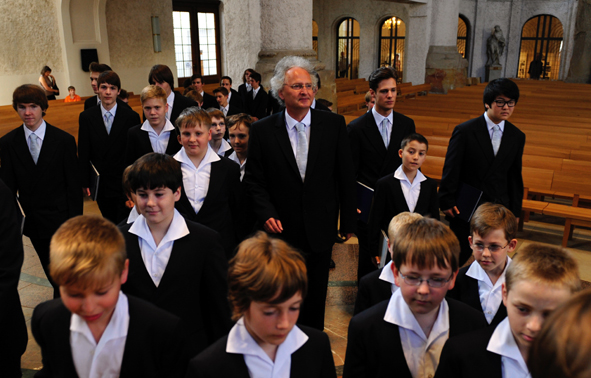
Members of the choir in 2012

The Dresdner Kreuzchor is the boys' choir of the Kreuzkirche in Dresden, Germany. It has a seven-century history and a world-wide reputation. Today, the choir has about 150 members between the ages of 9 and 19, from Dresden and the surrounding region. The boys attend the Kreuzschule in Dresden. They are also called "Kruzianer".

Until summer 2022, the director of the choir was Roderich Kreile, who is the 28th "Kreuzkantor" (Cantor) since the Reformation. He was succeeded by Martin Lehmann. The Cantor between 1971 and 1991 was Martin Flämig.

== Overview ==
The repertoire of the choir includes compositions from the early Baroque (Heinrich Schütz, Johann Sebastian Bach), the early 19th century and modern work. Several recordings are available from Berlin Classics, Deutsche Grammophon and Capriccio. The choir often performs with the Sächsische Staatskapelle Dresden and the Dresden Philharmonic Orchestra.

The choir sings Vespers almost every Saturday at 5 pm and on Sunday at 9:30 am in the Church Service. Every year, they go on several concert tours in Germany, but also in Europe, Japan, South Korea, Israel, Canada, Latin America and the United States. Altogether, the choir performs about 100 times every year: 50 Church Services and Vespers, 10 concerts at their church (always including Bach's Christmas Oratorio and St Matthew Passion, and A German Requiem of Brahms), and 40 concert on tours. All in all, 150,000 people see the performances of the choir every year.

The Dresdner Kreuzchor has performed at the Rheingau Musik Festival several times, notably in the first season in 1988 – the Inner German border still in effect – a concert in the Marktkirche, Wiesbaden. They concluded a program of motets from the Renaissance to Bach, Brahms and Bruckner with words about peace, O Herr, mache mich zum Werkzeug deines Friedens (after the Prayer of Saint Francis), in the presence of the composer Kurt Hessenberg.

Renowned opera houses like the Semperoper in Dresden, the Komische Oper Berlin and the Deutsche Oper Berlin have engaged members of the Dresdner Kreuzchor as soloists, for example as the three boys in The Magic Flute or as the shepherd-boy in Tosca.

== Former choir members ==
- Theo Adam, opera singer (bass-baritone)
- Clemens Bosselmann, choral conductor of the Schiersteiner Kantorei
- Olaf Bär, opera singer (baritone)
- Matthias Eisenberg, organist
- Hartmut Haenchen, conductor
- René Pape, opera singer (bass)
- Martin Petzoldt, theologian, minister, editor
- Eckart Preu, conductor of the Stamford Symphony and the Spokane Symphony
- Karl Richter, conductor, organist, harpsichordist
- Peter Schreier, opera singer (tenor)
- Jens Sembdner, Die Prinzen
- Eckehard Stier, music director of the Auckland Philharmonia Orchestra
- Hans Thamm, founder of the Windsbacher Knabenchor
- Wolfgang Unger, director of Leipziger Universitätsmusik
- Udo Zimmermann, composer, conductor

== Literature ==
- Karlheinz Blaschke: Dresden, Kreuzkirche, Kreuzschule, Kreuzchor, Kruzianer – musikalische und humanistische Tradition in 775 Jahren. Gütersloh/München 1991, ISBN 3-570-06664-9
- Dieter Härtwig, Matthias Herrmann: Der Dresdner Kreuzchor – Geschichte und Gegenwart, Wirkungsstätten und Schule. Evangelische Verlagsanstalt, Leipzig 2006, ISBN 3-374-02402-5
- Jürgen Helfricht: Dresdner Kreuzchor und Kreuzkirche. Eine Chronik von 1206 bis heute. Husum 2004, ISBN 3-89876-180-0
- Hans John: Der Dresdner Kreuzchor und seine Kantoren. Berlin 1987, ISBN 3-374-00177-7
- Corinna Wörner:Zwischen Kulturpflege und Kulturpropaganda – Thomaner- und Kreuzchor als Kulturbotschafter der DDR, in: Ritter, Rüdiger (Hg.): Musik und ihre gesellschaftliche Bedeutung in den staats- und postsozialistischen Ländern Mittel- und Osteuropas seit 1945, (Ostmitteleuropa interdisziplinär, Bd. 3), Wiesbaden 2023, p. 217–235, ISBN 978-3-447-12113-2.
