= Hans Thamm =

German choral conductor (1921–2007)

Hans Thamm (1921 – 13 March 2007) was a German choral conductor, the founder and for more than three decades director of the boys' choir Windsbacher Knabenchor.

== Career ==
Thamm was born in Kamenz, Saxony. He received his first musical training in the boys' choir Dresdner Kreuzchor, where he was active as a soprano singer, also in solo parts, and later as a choir prefect. Rudolf Mauersberger, then the Kreuzkantor, organist Herbert Collum and Alfred Bull, then the head of Protestant church music in Saxony, were among his teachers. During World War II, Thamm was severely injured three times.

After the war, Thamm took a job as a piano and organ teacher at the Institute of Sacred Music at the University of Erlangen. In March 1946 he was appointed both prefect of music at the former parish orphanage and music teacher at the Gymnasium in Windsbach. The same year he founded the choir that became internationally known as the Windsbacher Knabenchor as a regional choir of the Protestant church in Bavaria. Thamms artistic personality, paired with expert musicianship skills in the service of the Gospel proclamation, established the ensemble a position among the leading German boys' choirs already in the early 1950. He demanded the utmost of himself and his singers; his rehearsal style was rigid, for example a former singer recalls that boys who were not able to sight-read contemporary music—Strohbach, Kodály—had to stand for 45 minutes. The repertoire has been focussed on sacred music from the Renaissance to contemporary music, accenting Bach's cantatas, motets and oratorios. Under Thamm's direction, the choir began in 1955 to sing regularly in vesper services called "Motette" at St. Lorenz. He frequently conducted performances at the festival Bachwoche Ansbach. He took the choir on tours, first to Germany and Switzerland, and conducted several recordings. After conducting the choir for 31 years he was succeeded by Karl-Friedrich Beringer in 1978.

He died in Barthelmesaurach close to Schwabach.

== Awards ==
During his 32 years as conductor of the Windbacher Knabenchor, Thamm received many awards and honors, including the Bavarian Order of Merit and the Bavarian Culture Prize. In 1996, he became an honorary citizen of Windsbach.

== Selected recordings ==
Thamm recorded with the Windsbacher Knabenchor in 1961 Bach's cantatas Wer Dank opfert, der preiset mich, BWV 17 and Unser Mund sei voll Lachens, BWV 110, and in 1966 Wer nur den lieben Gott läßt walten, BWV 93, Aus der Tiefen rufe ich, Herr, zu dir, BWV 131 and Singet dem Herrn ein neues Lied, BWV 190. Soloists included Teresa Żylis-Gara, Peter Schreier, Franz Crass and Jakob Stämpfli.
