= Augusta College =

Augusta College may refer to:

- Augusta College (Kentucky), a former Methodist college in Augusta, Kentucky
- Augusta College (now known as Augusta University) in Augusta, Georgia

== See also ==
- Augustana College (disambiguation)
