= Basilius Petritz =

German composer

Basilius Petritz (20 May 1647 – 6 September 1715) was a German composer and Kreuzkantor in Dresden from 1694 to 1713.

Petritz was born in Großenhain, in the Electorate of Saxony. He succeeded the Thomaskantor Johann Schelle in Eilenburg, where he influenced the young Friedrich Zachow, until his bid for the Kreuzkantorat in 1694. He died in Dresden, aged 68.

== Works, editions and recordings ==
- Die Herrlichkeit des Herrn - recording on collection by Sächsisches Vocalensemble, Batzdorfer Hofkapelle, directed Matthias Jung CPO 2009.
