= Roderich Kreile =

German church musician, choir director and university teacher (born 1956)

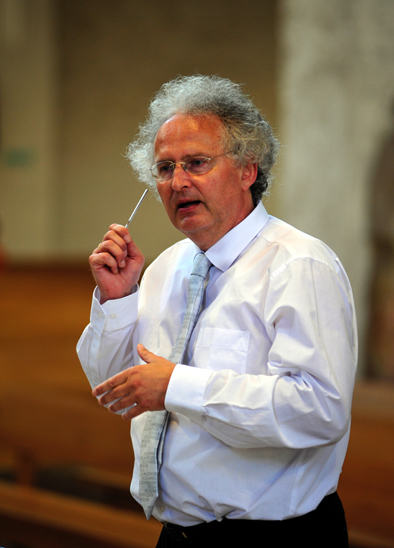
- Kreile in 2012
- Born: 4 December 1955 (age 70); Würzburg, West Germany
- Education: Hochschule für Musik und Theater München
- Occupation: Kantor
- Organizations: Dresdner Kreuzchor
- Awards: Sächsische Verfassungsmedaille

Roderich Kreile (born 1956) is a German Lutheran church musician, choir director and university teacher. He had been the director of the Dresdner Kreuzchor at the Kreuzkirche, Dresden, as the 28th Kreuzkantor since the Reformation from 1997 until his retirement in 2022.

== Life and work ==
Born 1956, Kreile studied church music and choral conducting in Munich. In 1981, he became a cantor at the Christ Church in Munich. From 1989 to 1996, he taught choral conducting at the Hochschule für Musik und Theater München. He was appointed Kirchenmusikdirektor (director of church music) in 1990. In 1994, he also prepared the choir Philharmonischer Chor München for concerts with the Münchner Philharmoniker. In 2010, he became a member of the Sächsische Akademie der Künste (Saxon Academy of Arts). He has been the vice chairman of the Neue Bachgesellschaft and an advisory board member of the International Heinrich Schütz Society.

Since 1997, Kreile has been the 28th Kreuzkantor since the Reformation. Leading the Dresdner Kreuzchor with its history of more than 700 years is regarded as one of the most prestigious positions the Protestant church in Germany has to offer ("eines der ehrenvollsten Ämter der evangelischen Kirchenmusik"). He has a contract until 2022. With him, the Dresdner Kreuzchor has appeared extensively at home and abroad. Tours have taken the choir through Germany, other European countries, to the United States, South America, South Korea and Japan. It is one of few boys' choirs serving as ambassadors of Saxony abroad. He has conducted premieres of choral music. On 2 July 2022, he retired after 25 years in office and was succeeded by Martin Lehmann, who had led the Windsbacher Knabenchor since 2012.

== Recordings ==
Kreile has recorded with the Dresdner Kreuzchor music written for Dresden, such as cantatas for Pentecost and a St John Passion which his predecessor the 15th Kreuzkantor Gottfried August Homilius composed for the Frauenkirche in Dresden.

== Awards ==
In 2005, the Dresdner Kreuzchor was awarded the Brahms-Preis (Brahms Prize). On 2 June 2012, Kreile was awarded the Sächsische Verfassungsmedaille by the president of the Saxon Landtag Matthias Rößler for "sein beeindruckendes künstlerisches Schaffen, das stets mit hohem persönlichen Einsatz und großem Erfolg verbunden ist" (his impressive artistic work, which is always associated with a high personal commitment and great success).
