= Thomas Palm (pianist) =

German soprano (1960–2026)

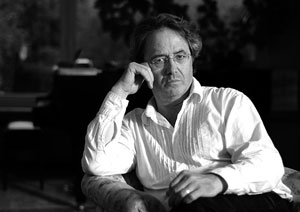
- Palm in 2008
- Born: 1952 (age 73–74); Aachen, North Rhine-Westphalia, Germany
- Occupation: Classical pianist

Thomas Palm (born 1952) is a German classical pianist who made an international career focused on Lied accompaniment. He was for decades the piano partner of Ingrid Schmithüsen who ran a series of recitals in Cologne.

== Life and career ==
Palm was born in Aachen on 18 February 1960. He studied at the Hochschule für Musik und Tanz Köln. During his studies, he was assistant in the Lied class of Dietrich Fischer-Dieskau, and he was elected by Deutscher Musikrat for the national concert series Konzerte junger Künstler. He achieved awards at international competitions. Palm made his debut as a soloist with Poulenc's Piano Concerto at the Kölner Philharmonie. He focused on Lied accompaniment, performing in Europe, the Americas, and East Asia.im Fernen Osten, at the Ludwigsburg Festival and the Schwetzingen Festival, among others.

Palm was for decades the pianist in recitals with Ingrid Schmithüsen who founded an association running a concert series of recitals entitled "im zentrum lied" (Lied in focus) that she directed until 2019. They performed a repertoire of 4000 lieder over 27 years. They programmed them in a recital in a dramatic sequence, trying to achieve a coherence as in the song cycles by Schubert and Schumann, and to tell "eine ungehörte Geschichte" (an unheared story), as she worded it. They made recordings of lieder selected around themes for the label Canterino. Kölner Philharmonie. Since 1999, Palm has worked in a duo with the soprano Irmelin Sloman.

He has run a piano class at the Robert Schumann Hochschule in Düsseldorf and has lectured at the Chorakademie in Siena.

Palm lives with his wife and two children in Schladern, part of Windeck, where he conducts a local men's chorus and the corresponding women's chorus.
