= Kulturpreis der Hansestadt Rostock =

German culture prize

- Native name: Kulturpreis der Hansestadt Rostock
- Description: Cultural prize honoring significant contributions to the intellectual and cultural life of Rostock
- Country: Germany
- Presented by: Rostock City Government (Lord Mayor)
- Reward: €3,500

The Kulturpreis der Hansestadt Rostock is a German cultural award endowed with 3,500 euros.

From 1958 to 1995, up to five persons and associations were honoured annually, since 1996 it has been limited to one personality or association. Since 2003, the prize has been awarded every two years.

The prize is awarded to an individual or a body/association from the fields of culture, science, business and politics for an individual achievement or for a complete work, for cultural commitment and for achievements that significantly enrich the intellectual and cultural life of the Hanseatic city of Rostock. The cultural committee prepares a vote from the submitted proposals. The Lord Mayor decides on the awarding of the prize.

== Prizes winners since 1989 ==
- 1989: Wolfgang Friedrich, sculptor; Werner Lindemann, Schriftsteller; Omar Saavedra Santis, author
- 1990: Dietlind Glüer, Member of the Citizens' Committee; Helmut Aude, Press Office Manager; Joachim Wiebering, Regional Superintendent, Moderator of the Round Table; Horst Vogt-Courvoisier, Provost, Moderator of the Round Table; Hans-Joachim Wagner, Church Music Director
- 1991: Christoph Krummacher, University organist. Jürgen Gundlach, scientific working place Mecklenburg dictionary
- 1992: Detlef Hamer, journalist; Frank Schröder, historian (Rückgabe 2004).
- 1993 Jugendzentrum M.A.U; Compagnie de Comédie Rostock; Otto Brusch, cellist
- 1994: Gerhard Weber, photographer Rudolf Eller, musicologist
- 1995: Elisabeth Schnitzler, archivist; Manfred Schukowski for the care of the astronomical clock in the St. Mary's Church, Rostock
- 1996: Arvid Schnauer, Pastor Ufergemeinde Groß Klein
- 1997: Institut Français de Rostock
- 1998: Norddeutsche Philharmonie Rostock on the occasion of its 100th anniversary.
- 1999: Deutsch-Japanische Gesellschaft zu Rostock e.V..
- 2000: Renate Oehme, former director of the conservatory
- 2001: Gerhard Lau, historic preservationist
- 2002: Urs Blaser of the MS Stubnitz e.V. for services to innovative cultural and youth work.
- 2003: Annette Handke, director of the Literaturhauses Kuhtor
- 2005: Shantychor "De Klaashahns" and the Filmverein "Ro-cine"
- 2007: Pasternack Big Band
- 2009: Markus Johannes Langer, Kantor at the St. Johannis and the Plattdeutsch-Verein Klönsnack-Rostocker 7 e.V.
- 2011: media workshop at the institute for new media
- 2013: Karl Scharnweber, church musician and composer.
- 2015: Franziska Pfaff, director of the Welt-Musik-Schule "Carl Orff" of the Hansestadt Rostock e.V.
- 2017: Jugendsinfonieorchester der Hansestadt Rostock.
- 2019: Ulrich Ptak, curator of the Kunsthalle Rostock.
- 2021: Ralph Kirsten (cultural manager and co-founder of the independent cultural scene)
- 2023: Wolfgang Schmiedt (musician and cultural manager)
- 2025: Dritte Wahl (punk rock band)
