= Augustana College =

Augustana College may refer to:

- Augustana College (Illinois)
- Augustana University Sioux Falls, South Dakota
- Augustana University College, Alberta

== See also ==
- Augustana Divinity School (Neuendettelsau), Bavaria, Germany
