= Michael Heinemann =

German musicologist and church musician

Michael Heinemann (born 5 March 1959) is a German musicologist and university professor.

== Career ==
Born in Bergisch Gladbach, Heinemann passed his Abitur at the Nicolaus-Cusanus-Gymnasium Bergisch Gladbach in 1977. From 1978 to 1985 he studied Catholic church music (A-exam 1982), music pedagogy (state music teacher examination 1983) and concert subject organ (class Wolfgang Stockmeier, university diploma 1985) at the Hochschule für Musik und Tanz Köln. From 1982 to 1988 he studied musicology, philosophy and art history at the universities of Cologne, Bonn and Berlin, graduating in 1988 with a Master's degree. From 1986 to 1989 he worked as a tutor at the Musicological Institute of Technische Universität Berlin with Carl Dahlhaus. From 1989 to 1991 he received a doctoral scholarship from the State of Berlin and was awarded a doctorate at the TU Berlin in 1991 with a dissertation on the reception of Bach with Franz Liszt. From 1991 to 1993 he worked as a freelance musicologist, published books and did editorial work for radio stations. At the same time he held teaching positions at the Hochschule für Musik "Hanns Eisler" in Berlin, the Hochschule für Musik Carl Maria von Weber Dresden and the Folkwang-Hochschule Essen. From 1994 to 1996 he was granted a habilitation scholarship by the German Research Foundation. In 1997 Heinemann was habilitated at the TU Berlin with a study on music theory in the 17th century.

From 1998 to 2000, he held a professorship for historical musicology at the Carl Maria von Weber Academy of Music Dresden. Since 2000 he has been Professor of Historical Musicology there, and from 2003 to 2006 he served as Dean of the Department of Musicology.

His main areas of work include the history of Bach's reception and - in cooperation with the Robert Schumann House in Zwickau - a complete edition of Robert and Clara Schumann's letters (published by Dohr), of which he is one of the editors. Heinemann is editor and co-editor of numerous books and series of publications.

== Publications ==
=== As author ===
- Heinrich Schütz. Reinbek bei Hamburg 1994, 1290-ISBN 3 499 50490 1.
- Der Komponist für Komponisten. Bach-Rezeptionen vom 18. bis zum 20. Jahrhundert. (Bach nach Bach 2). Cologne 2010, ISBN 978-3-936655-71-1.
- Claudio Monteverdi. Die Entdeckung der Leidenschaft. Schott, Mainz 2017, ISBN 978-3-7957-1213-6.

=== As editor and co-editor ===
- with Hans John: Die Dresdner Oper im 19. Jahrhundert (Musik in Dresden 1), Laaber 1995.
- with Hans John: Die Dresdner Oper im 20. Jahrhundert (Musik in Dresden 7), Laaber 2005.
- Hermann Abert: Johann Sebastian Bach. Bausteine zu einer Biographie (Bach nach Bach 1). Cologne 2008, ISBN 978-3-936655-56-8.
- with Hans-Joachim Hinrichsen and Carmen Ottner: Öffentliche Einsamkeit. Das deutschsprachige Lied und seine Komponisten im frühen 20. Jahrhundert. Cologne 2009, ISBN 978-3-936655-73-5.
- Schriftstücke von Heinrich Schütz (Schütz-Dokumente 1). Using the text transfers worked out by Manfred Fechner and Konstanze Kremtz according to the sources. Cologne 2010, ISBN 978-3-936655-80-3.
- with Kristel Pappel: Oper mit Herz. Das Musiktheater des Joachim Herz. Vol. 1 to 3: Cologne 2010–2011, ISBN 978-3-936655-92-6, ISBN 978-3-936655-93-3, ISBN 978-3-936655-94-0.
- Johann Rosenmüller: Kernsprüche I (Kritische Ausgabe sämtlicher Werke von Johann Rosenmüller, edited by Holger Eichhorn, 1), Cologne 2012.
