= Wolfram Steude =

Wolfram Steude (20 September 1931 – 9 March 2006) was a German musicologist and musician.

== Life ==
Born in Plauen, Steude is the grandson of the Dresden architect Martin Pietzsch. He graduated from the Dresden Kreuzschule and was a Crucian under Rudolf Mauersberger for two years. He studied Church music and organ at the Church Music Institute of the University of Music and Theatre Leipzig and at the Hochschule für Kirchenmusik Dresden. Afterwards he studied music and art until 1958. He received his doctorate in 1973 in Rostock with Rudolf Eller.

From 1955 he was a full-time cantor, first in Leipzig and later until 1976 in Dresden-Loschwitz. Between 1961 and 1981 Steude worked first as a freelancer and then full-time in the music department of the Saxon State Library in Dresden. In 1985, he was jointly responsible for the Heinrich Schütz Honour of the GDR and was honoured for this with the National Prize of the German Democratic Republic. Until 1996 he worked first as a lecturer and curator, and from 1992 as professor at the Dresden University of Music.

Steude was regarded as one of the most important Schütz researchers. The association "Heinrich Schütz in Dresden" was founded under his leadership in January 2006. As part of the musicology department, he built up the Heinrich-Schütz-Archive, which was officially opened in 1988. His research work covered Central German music and the cultivation of music from Middle Ages to Baroque. In addition, he was engaged for many years in the church choir of the Evangelical-Lutheran Church of Saxony.

He was co-editor of the Schütz-Jahrbuch.

Steude died in Dresden at the age of 74.

== Literature ==
- Wolfram Steude: Annäherung durch Distanz. Texte zur älteren mitteldeutschen Musik und Musikgeschichte. On the occasion of the 70th birthday of Wolfram Steude ed. by Matthias Herrmann. Kamprad, Altenburg 2001, ISBN 3-930550-18-0 (pp. 257–263: Bibliographie Steude).
- Wolfram Steude: Heinrich Schütz – Mensch, Werk, Wirkung. Texte und Reden. With a foreword by Josua Rifkin, edited by Matthias Herrmann, Marburg 2016 (Dresdner Schriften zur Musik, vol. 7), ISBN 978-3-8288-3840-6 (pp. 355–340 Bibliographie Steude about Schütz).
- Matthias Herrmann: in memoriam Wolfram Steude. In Forum Kirchenmusik. 57, 6, 2006, ISSN 1434-2340, pp. 36 f.
