= Manfred Schukowski =

German, astronomer, teacher, and author (1928–2025)

- Schukowski in the 2010s
- Born: 16 January 1928; Stralsund, Germany
- Died: 14 March 2025 (aged 97)
- Occupations: Pedagogue; Author
- Awards: Kulturpreis der Hansestadt Rostock

Manfred Schukowski (16 January 1928 – 14 March 2025) was a German astronomer. He worked as a teacher of mathematics and physics at schools and teacher-training institutions. He authored books on astronomical clocks, including a textbook and an encyclopedia, and a book about the clock of St. Mary's Church in Rostock. He calculated a new calendar disc for it, running from 2018 to 2150.

== Life ==
Schukowski grew up in Stralsund where he was born and attended school from 1934 to 1944. In 1945, he became a sailor on the Schwedenschanze. After the Second World War, he worked as a Neulehrer, from 1946 at the central school in Koblentz and from 1947 to 1949 at the school in Negast. In 1948, he passed the first teacher's examination, and from 1949 to 1950 he took the subject course in mathematics/physics at the Diesterweg Institute for Teacher Training in Putbus. He passed the second teacher's examination in 1950 and was a teacher of mathematics and physics at the Torgelow secondary school from 1950 to 1953. He then attended the special physics course at the Pädagogische Hochschule "Karl Liebknecht" in Potsdam for one year.

Schukowski was a research assistant and lecturer at the physics methodology department of the Pädagogische Hochschule Halle-Köthen from 1954 to 1959 and again from 1962 to 1965. In between, from 1959 to 1962, he was a teacher at the Gymnasium für deutsche Sprache, a secondary school in German, in Lovech, Bulgaria. In 1963, he acquired an external teaching qualification for astronomy at the Potsdam College of Education. From 1965 to 1969, he was head of physics and astronomy at the school administration of the Rostock district of the GDR. He was responsible for teacher training from 1969 to 1990. In 1970, he received his doctorate at the University of Rostock, where he habilitated in 1979.

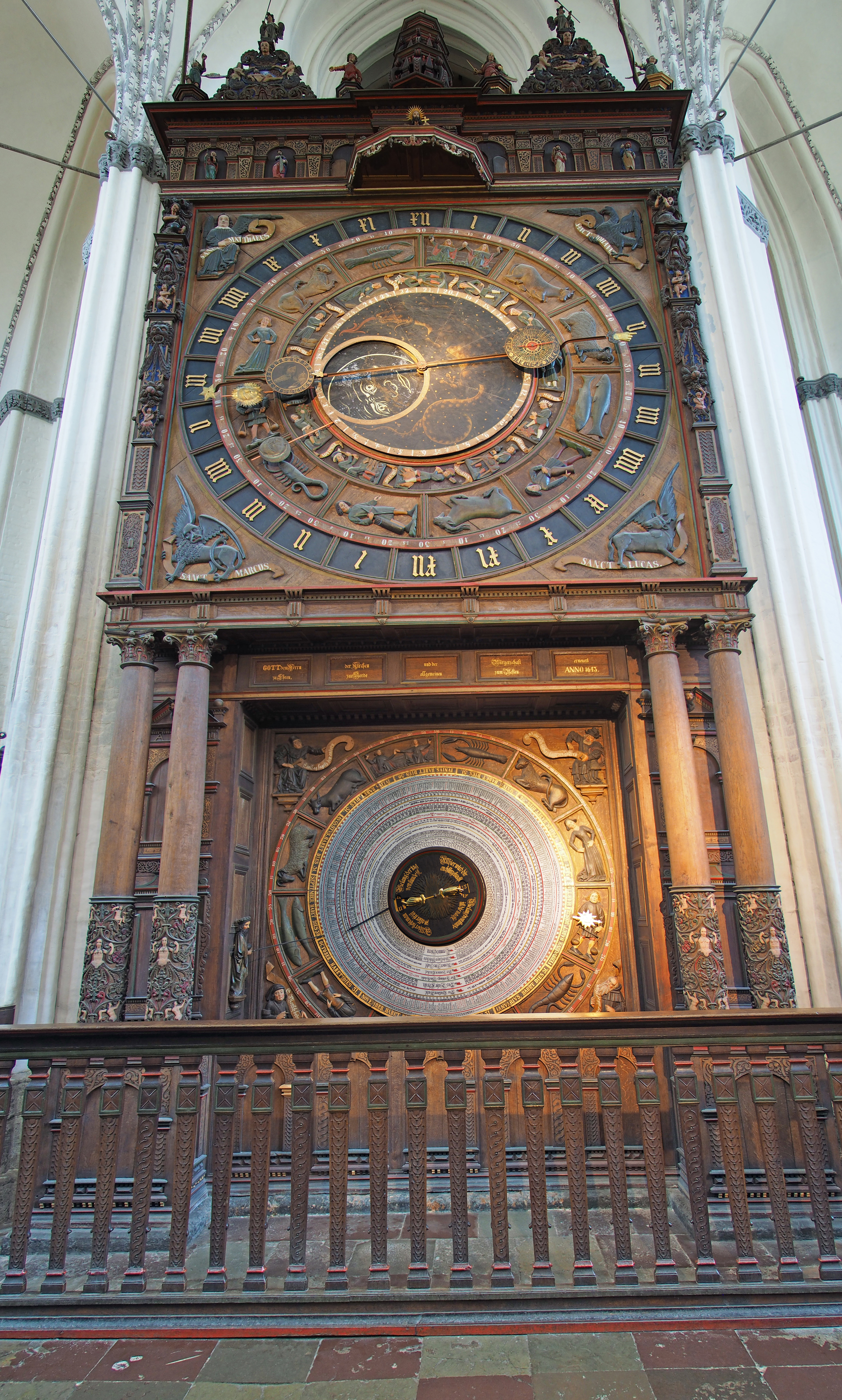
Astronomical clock at St. Mary's Church, Rostock

Schukowski was dedicated to working on astronomical clocks since 1978; he calculated a new calendar disc of the astronomical clock of St. Mary's Church, Rostock, which was put into use on 1 January 2018 and contains the dates up to 2150.

Schukowski died on 14 March 2025, aged 97.

== Work ==
Schukowski published various works on the methodology of teaching physics and astronomy, as well as textbooks and numerous works on astronomical clocks in the Baltic region, including several books.

- Die astronomische Uhr in St. Marien zu Rostock. Langewiesche, Königstein im Taunus 2010, ISBN 978-3-7845-1236-5 (with English summary)
- Wunderuhren in Kirchen: Astronomische Uhren in Kirchen der Hansezeit. Helms, Schwerin 2006, ISBN 978-3-935749-03-9
- Astronomie, neue Rechtschreibung, textbook. Cornelsen 1999, ISBN 978-3-06-081010-9
- Wissensspeicher: Astronomie, encyclopedia. Cornelsen 1995, ISBN 978-3-06-081705-4
- Sonne, Mond und zwölf Apostel. Die Astronomische Uhr in der Marienkirche zu Rostock. Helms, Schwerin 2012, ISBN 978-3-940207-76-0

== Honours ==
- 1995 Kulturpreis der Hansestadt Rostock
- 2013 Ehrenbuch of Rostock
- 2013 Philipp Matthäus Hahn-Medal of the Deutsche Gesellschaft für Chronometrie
- 2015 Ehrenpreis of the Sternwarte Greifswald
- 2021 Award for Denkmalpflege of Mecklenburg
