= Gregory of Heimburg =

German jurist, humanist and statesman

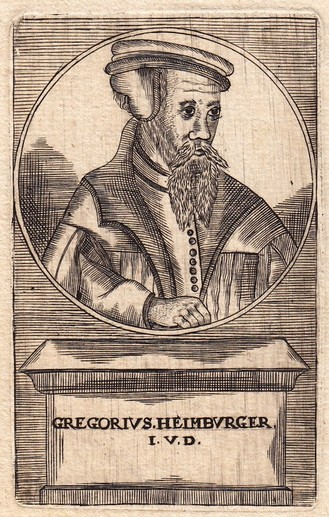
Gregory of Heimburg 1399-1472

Gregory of Heimburg (Gregorius Heimburgensis) (b. at Würzburg in the beginning of the fifteenth century; d. at Tharandt near Dresden, August, 1472) was a German jurist, humanist and statesman.

== Biography ==
About 1430, Gregory received the degree of Doctor of Both Laws at the University of Padua. Filled with the prevalent ideas of reform, this ardent and eloquent jurist was naturally attracted to the Council of Basle, convened, according to the assembled prelates, for "the extirpation of heresy, and of the Greek schism. . . .and for the reformation of the Church in her Head and members". While at the council he became the secretary of Æneas Sylvius.

He left Basle in 1433, when he was elected syndic of Nuremberg, in which capacity he served until 1461. After the election of Albert VI of Austria, he was sent, with John of Lysura, to the Council of Basle to demand that the proceedings against the pope be suspended, and then to Eugene IV at Ferrara to propose that the negotiations with the Greeks be carried on in a German city.

In 1446 he was again placed at the head of an embassy to Eugene IV. The pope had deposed the Archbishops of Cologne and Trier, both electoral princes, who favoured the antipope Felix V. The other electors now demanded of Eugene (1) his approval of certain decrees of Basle; (2) the convocation of a general council in a German city within three months; (3) the acceptance of the article on the superiority of the council over the pope; and (4) the reinstating of the two deposed archbishops. But Gregory's mission was unsuccessful.

On the advice of Frederick III the pope sent Cardinal Tommaso Parentucelli and Cardinal Juan Carvajal, with Nicholas of Cusa, as legates to the Diet of Frankfort, 14 Sep 1446. With them was Æneas Sylvius, now the private secretary of Emperor Frederick III. Some of the electors were won over to the cause of the pope; a new embassy was organized; and in February, 1447, shortly before the death of Eugene, the four Bulls constituting the Concordat of the Princes was promulgated. In February, 1448, a complete agreement was reached in the Concordat of Vienna, concluded between Frederick III and Nicholas V.

Gregory, who had considered even the declaration of neutrality an ignoble concession, was disappointed at this turn of events and decided to abandon ecclesiastical politics. During the negotiations between the pope and the electors there appeared the anonymous "Admonitio de injustis usurpationibus paparum" or, as Matthias Flacius entitles it, "Confutatio primatus papæ", which is generally ascribed to Gregory.

In 1458 Gregory entered the service of Albert of Austria and his opposition to papal authority was again aroused. Æneas Sylvius had ascended the papal throne as Pius II the same year, and soon afterwards (1459) summoned the princes of Christendom to Mantua to plan a crusade against the Turks. Gregory was present as the representative of Bavaria-Landshut, Kurmainz, and the Archduke Albert of Austria. The failure of the project was partly due to his influence.

Sigismund of Austria, on his return from the Congress of Mantua, imprisoned Nicholas of Cusa, Bishop of Brixen, with whom he was quarrelling over certain fiefs. He was excommunicated 1 June 1460, and through Gregory of Heimburg appealed to a general council. Gregory went to Rome, but to no avail, and on his return journey posted the duke's appeal on the doors of the cathedral of Florence. The pope then excommunicated him and ordered the Council of Nuremberg to confiscate his property (18 October 1460). Gregory answered in January, 1461, with an appeal to a general council. Pius II renewed the excommunication and commissioned Bishop Lelio of Feltre to reply to Gregory's appeal. The "Replica Theodori Lælii episcopi Feltrensis pro Pio Papa II et sede Romanâ" brought forth from Gregory his "Apologia contra detractationes et blasphemias Theodori Lælii" together with his "Depotestate ecclesiæ Romanæ", in which he defended the theories of Basle.

His next important writing, "Invectiva in Nicolaum de Cusa", appeared in 1461. Shortly before the death of Pius II in 1464, Sigismund made his peace with the Church, but Gregory was not absolved. In 1466 he was taken into the service of George Podiebrad, King of Bohemia, and exercised a great influence on the Bohemian king's anti-Roman policy. In two apologies for Podiebrad, Gregory violently attacked Pope Paul II, whom he charged with immorality. He was again excommunicated and his property at Dettlebach confiscated.

After the death of George Podiebrad (22 March 1471) Gregory took refuge in Saxony. Writing to the Council of Würzburg as early as 22 January 1471, he said he was never accused of having erred in one article of Christian faith. He applied by letter to Sixtus IV, who gave the Bishop of Meissen full power to absolve him. He was buried in the Kreuzkirche at Dresden.

== Works ==
His writings were published at Frankfort in 1608 under the title "Scripta nervosa justiaque plena ex manuscriptis nunc primum eruta". They may be found in Goldast, "Monarchia", in Marquard Freher, "Scriptores rerum Germanicarum", and in Joachimsohn (see below).
