= Karl Scharnweber =

German church musician, jazz player and composer

Karl Scharnweber (born 1950) in Rostock is a German church musician, Jazz musician, and composer.

== Life ==
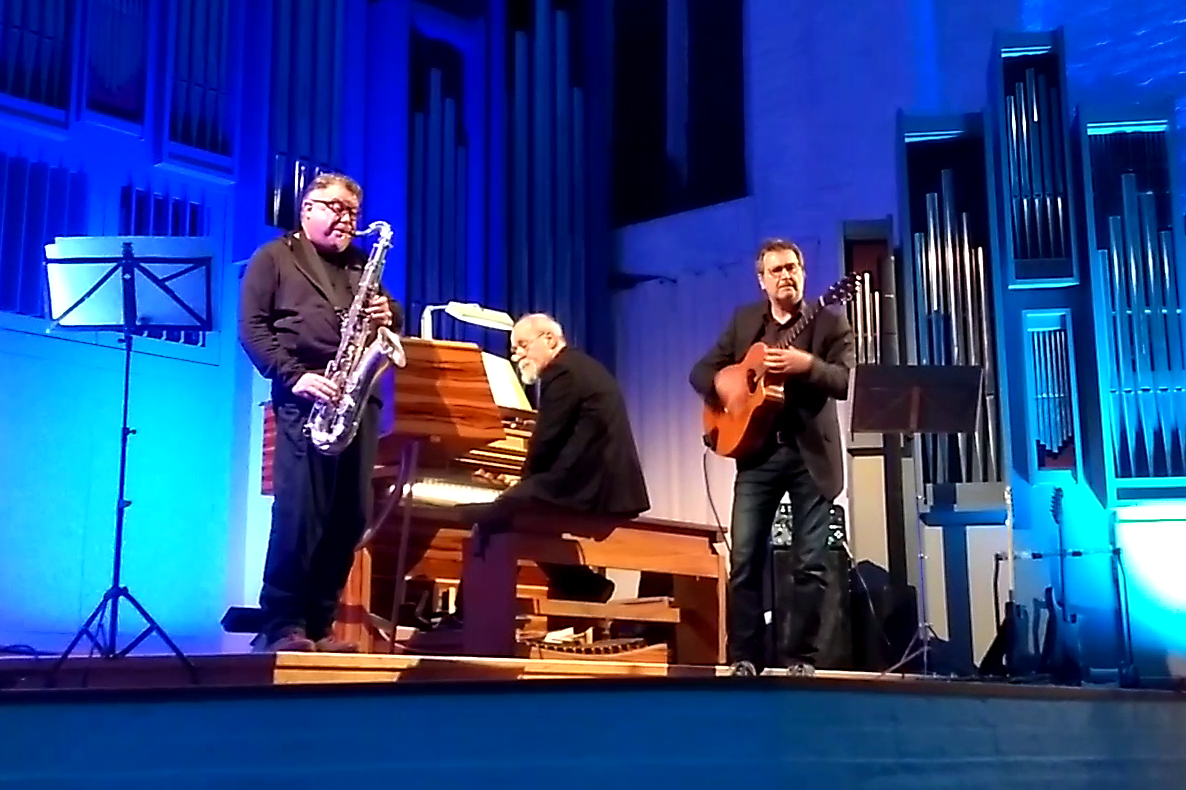
Karl Scharnweber (organ) with Choral Concert 2019

After his school years in Rostock, Scharnweber began studying church music at the Evangelische Hochschule für Kirchenmusik Halle in 1969. From 1973, he worked as a church musician in various churches in Mecklenburg. In addition to this task, which he held part-time at the inner-city parish of Rostock from 1997 to 2016, he devotes himself to composing and performing new arrangements on various theological texts. As early as the 1970s, Scharnweber worked with the Weber Trio to perform his own jazz compositions.

In 1987, he founded a trio by the name of, ChoralConcert with Thomas Klemm (tenor saxophone, flute) and Wolfgang Schmiedt (guitars), in order to be able to realise his musical ideas. The texts for his works are mainly provided by the theology professor Eckart Reinmuth from Rostock, with further texts by Ingo Barz. The works reach beyond church music and also deal with historical and contemporary critical themes. Scharnweber is co-founder of the association Canticum novum, which supports Reinmuth's and Scharnweber's work and enables a continuous work.

Numerous concert tours have taken Scharnweber to various countries in Europe and the US. Scharnweber is socially committed and is considered modest: he has performed with ChoralConcert in nursing homes, in the Justizvollzugsanstalt Bützow or at Aids services. In June 2013, he received the Kulturpreis der Hansestadt Rostock.
