= Friedhelm Krummacher =

German musicologist (born 1936)

Friedhelm Krummacher (born 22 January 1936) is a German musicologist.

== Life ==
Born in Berlin, Krummacher is the second oldest son of Friedrich-Wilhelm Krummacher. He studied musicology after his private music teacher examination in 1957, philosophy and German studies in Berlin, Marburg and Uppsala and was awarded a doctorate in 1964 with repertoire studies on the older church music in Berlin by Adam Adrio. From 1965 to 1972 he worked as an assistant at the Erlangen seminary with Martin Ruhnke, where he habilitated in 1972 with studies on chamber music by Felix Mendelssohn Bartholdy. He remained there as a private lecturer until 1975, when, after a professorship at the Hochschule für Musik Detmold, he was appointed full professor at the Christian-Albrechts-Universität in Kiel in 1976.

In 1983 he founded and directed the Johannes-Brahms-Gesamtausgabe, he is also co-editor of the Mendelssohn and Buxtehude Complete Editions. From 1992 to 1994 he was founding dean of the Faculty of Philosophy at the Humboldt University Berlin. He retired in 2001.

His works are dedicated to the history of music from the Renaissance to the modern age. His main areas of work are church and organ music of the 16th to 18th centuries, music theory and music aesthetics, the history of the string quartet from the 18th to the 20th century and the composers Johann Sebastian Bach, Felix Mendelssohn Bartholdy, Johannes Brahms, Gustav Mahler and Max Reger.

Krummacher is a member of the Joachim-Jungius-Gesellschaft der Wissenschaften in Hamburg, of the Norwegian Academy of Science and Letters and the Royal Swedish Academy of Music and since 1995 honour member of the Humboldt-Universität zu Berlin. In 2003 he received an honorary doctorate from Uppsala University (Sweden). Since 1996 he has been co-editor of the Schütz-Jahrbuch.

== Honours ==
- Rezeption als Innovation, Untersuchungen zu einem Grundmodell der europäischen Kompositionsgeschichte: Festschrift für Friedhelm Krummacher. Edited by Siegfried Oechsle, Bernd Sponheuer, Helmut Well. Kassel 2001.

== Publications ==
- Mendelssohn, der Komponist – Studien zur Kammermusik für Streicher. Munich 1978.
- with Heinrich Wilhelm Schwab (ed.): Gattung und Werk in der Musikgeschichte Norddeutschlands und Skandinaviens. Bärenreiter, Kassel 1982.
- with Hermann Danuser (ed.): Rezeptionsästhetik und Rezeptionsgeschichte in der Musikwissenschaft. (Publications of the HfMuT Hannover, vol. 3). Laaber, 1991.
- Gustav Mahlers Symphonie Nr. 3 – Welt im Widerbild. Bärenreiter, Kassel 1991.
- Das Streichquartett. 2 vols. (Handbuch der musikalischen Gattungen, vol. 6). Laaber, 2001 and 2003.
- revised edition (without pictures): Geschichte des Streichquartetts. 3 vols. Laaber, 2005.
- Romantik und Moderne.

== Literature ==
- Christian Berger: Krummacher, Friedhelm. In The New Grove Dictionary of Music and Musicians.
