= Karl-Friedrich Beringer =

German choral conductor

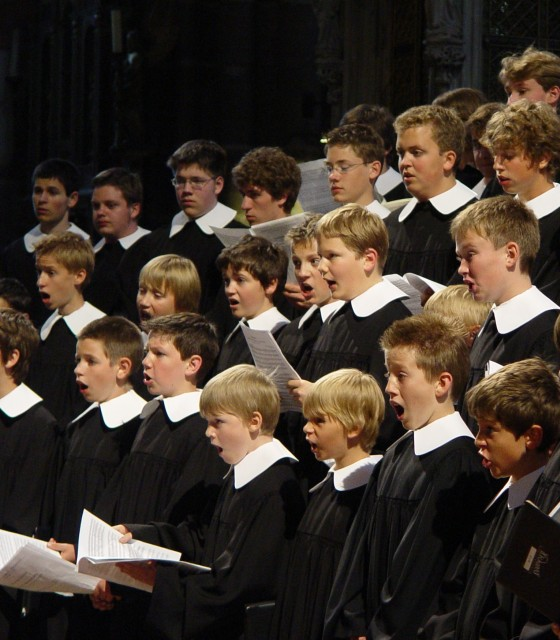
Windsbacher Knabenchor

Hans Karl-Friedrich Beringer (born 7 January 1948, in Neuendettelsau) is a German choral and orchestral conductor, who was from 1978 to 2011 the conductor of the Windsbacher Knabenchor.

== Life ==
Born in Neuendettelsau, Beringer studied at the Meistersinger Conservatory in Nuremberg. In 1970, still a student, he founded the Amadeus Choir and the Amadeus Orchestra. From 1976 to 1978 he was artistic director of the International Festival Youth Choir of Bayreuth. In 1978 he succeeded Hans Thamm as director of the boys' choir Windsbacher Knabenchor and led the ensemble to world fame.

Beringer has worked together with renowned orchestras, especially with the Deutsches Symphonie-Orchester Berlin, the Munich Radio Orchestra and the Münchener Kammerorchester. Since 1981 he has been a regular at national and international music festivals, known for conducting choral works with orchestra, such as Bach's Mass in B minor, St Matthew Passion, St John Passion, and Christmas Oratorio, Mendelssohn's Elijah, Mozart's Requiem, Stravinski's Psalmensinfonie, and Ein deutsches Requiem by Brahms.

He was awarded the Federal Cross of Merit by then President Richard von Weizsäcker for his outstanding services to the youth. In 2007, he and his choir received the Rheingau Musik Preis. On 12 February 2008, Beringer was awarded an honorary doctorate of the Augustana-Hochschule Neuendettelsau.

In September 2010 he announced that he resigned his position as artistic director of the Windsbacher Knabenchor. On 1 February 2012, Martin Lehmann became his successor. He lives in Merkendorf.

== Tours ==
As a choral and orchestral conductor, Beringer has been a regular guest at international music festivals, including Bachfest Schaffhausen, Bachfest Leipzig, Bachwoche Ansbach, at the Brandenburg Summer Concerts, the Schleswig-Holstein Musik Festival and the Rheingau Musik Festival where Beringer conducted the choir 17 times. Concerts there included Bach's cantatas O ewiges Feuer, o Ursprung der Liebe, BWV 34, Man singet mit Freuden vom Sieg, BWV 149, Singet dem Herrn ein neues Lied, BWV 190, and Magnificat in 2007, Bach's St John Passion in Eberbach Abbey in 2009 and a final Christmas concert in the Kurhaus Wiesbaden in 2011.

Concerts with the choir took him not only to other European countries (Norway, Finland, Malta, France, Great Britain, Netherlands, Belgium, Poland, Spain, Greece), but also to the Middle East (Israel), the Far East (China, Japan, Taiwan, Singapore), Australia, the USA and South America (Brazil, Argentina, Uruguay).
