= Rudolf Eller =

German musicologist (1914–2001)

Rudolf Eller (9 May 1914 – 24 September 2001) was a German musicologist and professor at the University of Rostock.

== Life ==
Born in Dresden, Eller was the son of violist Arthur Emil Eller and his wife Margarete. From 1934 to 1936 he studied organ, composition and choral conducting at the orchestra school of the Sächsische Staatskapelle Dresden, then until 1941 musicology, art history, history and philosophy at the universities of Leipzig and Vienna. From 1941 until the end of the war Eller was drafted into military service.

He began his professional career in 1945 with a position at the Musicological Institute of the University of Leipzig. In 1947 Rudolf Eller received his doctorate in Leipzig and in 1957 he also habilitated in Leipzig. From 1952 until his transfer to the University of Rostock in 1959, he was a frequent guest lecturer in Rostock and Leipzig and was already temporarily in charge of the Rostock Institute for Musicology, where he subsequently worked as a lecturer until 1962. In 1962 he was appointed professor with a teaching assignment, and in 1970 he became full professor of musicology.

His teaching and research interests included Antonio Vivaldi and Johann Sebastian Bach. Between 1971 and 1978 Rudolf Eller organized colloquia on Antonio Vivaldi in Dresden, and in 1979 a colloquium on Johann Sebastian Bach in Rostock. He was a member of the Neue Bachgesellschaft and the Gesellschaft für Musikforschung. From 1966 to 1977 Eller was editor of the Deutsche Jahrbuchs der Musikwissenschaft.

Wolfram Steude was among his students.

Eller died in Rostock at age 87.

== Publications ==
- Die Konzertform Johann Sebastian Bachs, 1947
- Das Formprinzip des Vivaldischen Konzerts, Leipzig, 1957
- 100 Jahre Neue Bachgesellschaft, Evangelische Verlagsanstalt publisher Leipzig, 2001
- Editor of several Vivaldi concertos

== Honours ==
- 1994 Honorary membership of the Gesellschaft für Musikforschung
- 1994 Kulturpreis der Hansestadt Rostock
- 1996 Honorary membership of the Neuen Bachgesellschaft
