= Neuendettelsau =

- Municipality
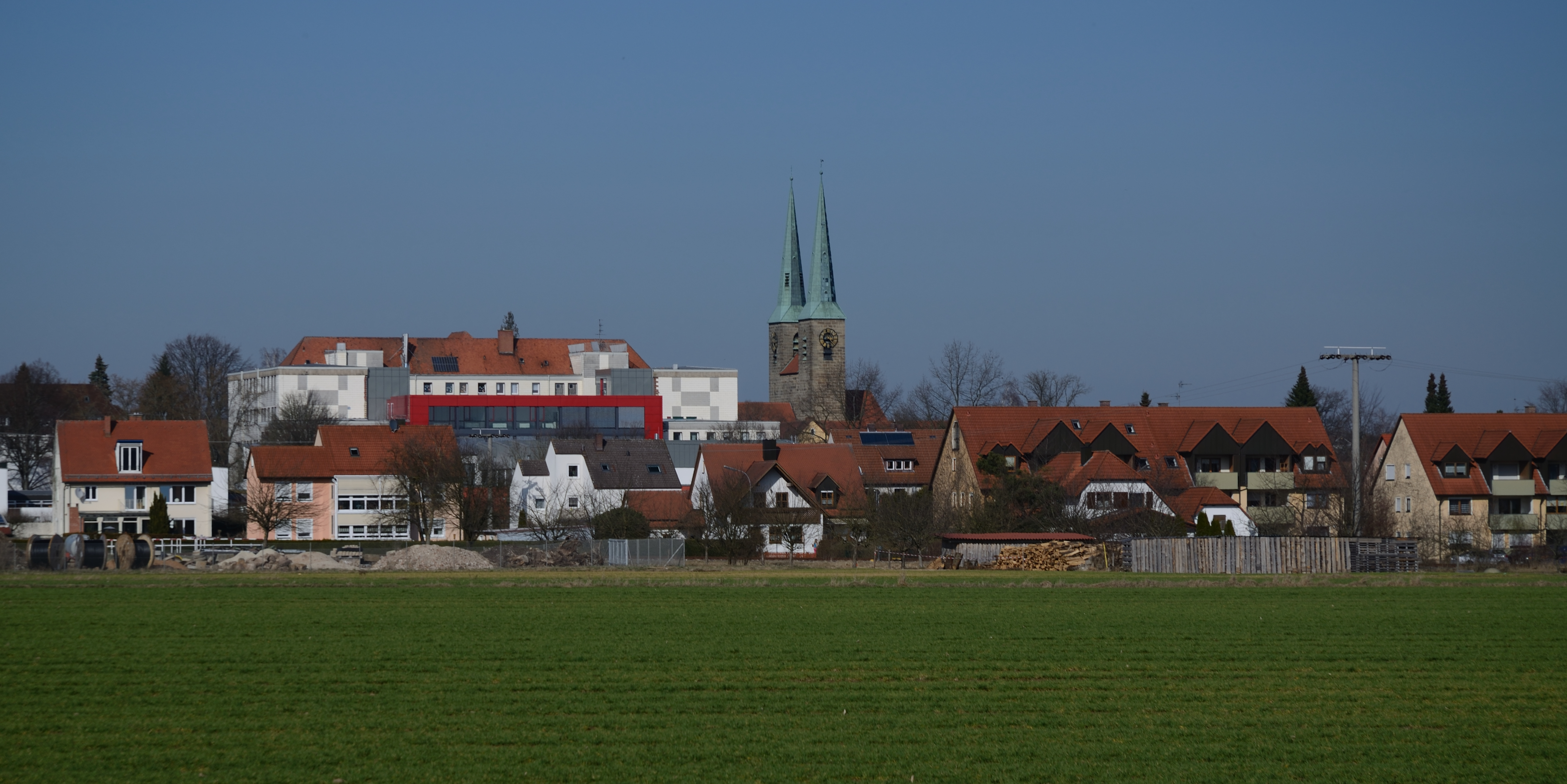
- View over Neuendettelsau

- Coat of arms

- Location of Neuendettelsau within Ansbach district
- Interactive map of Neuendettelsau
- Location within Germany Location within Bavaria
- Coordinates: 49°16′N 10°46′E
- Country: Germany
- State: Bavaria
- Admin. region: Mittelfranken
- District: Ansbach
- Subdivisions: 19 Ortsteile

Government
  - Mayor (2020–26): Christoph Schmoll (SPD)

Area
  - Total: 33.8 km^{2} (13.1 sq mi)
- Elevation: 438 m (1,437 ft)

Population (2025-12-31)
  - Total: 8,074
  - Density: 239/km^{2} (619/sq mi)
- Time zone: UTC+01:00 (CET)
  - Summer (DST): UTC+02:00 (CEST)
- Postal codes: 91564
- Dialling codes: 09874, 09871 (Wernsbach), 09872 (Aich, Hammerschmiede, Mausendorf, Mausenmühle)
- Vehicle registration: AN, DKB, FEU, ROT
- Website: www.neuendettelsau.eu

Neuendettelsau is a local authority in Middle Franconia, Germany. Neuendettelsau is situated 20 miles southwest of Nuremberg and 12 miles east of Ansbach. Since 1846 it has a Lutheran seminary (Augustana Hochschule).

== Politics ==
The mayor is Christoph Schmoll (SPD), elected in March 2020.

=== Sister city ===
- Treignac (France), since 1996

== Notable people ==
- Karl-Friedrich Beringer, choirmaster of the Windsbacher Knabenchor de:Windsbacher Knabenchor
- Johann Konrad Wilhelm Loehe, Lutheran pastor and theologian.
- Walter Burkert, world-famous German scholar of ancient Greek mythology and religion.

== Literature ==
- Matthias Honold, Hans Rößler (Hrsg.): 700 Jahre Neuendettelsau, Neuendettelsau 1998.
- Hans Rößler (Hrsg.): Unter Stroh- und Ziegeldächern. Aus der Neuendettelsauer Geschichte, Neuendettelsau 1982.
