= Martin Lehmann =

German choral conductor (born 1973)

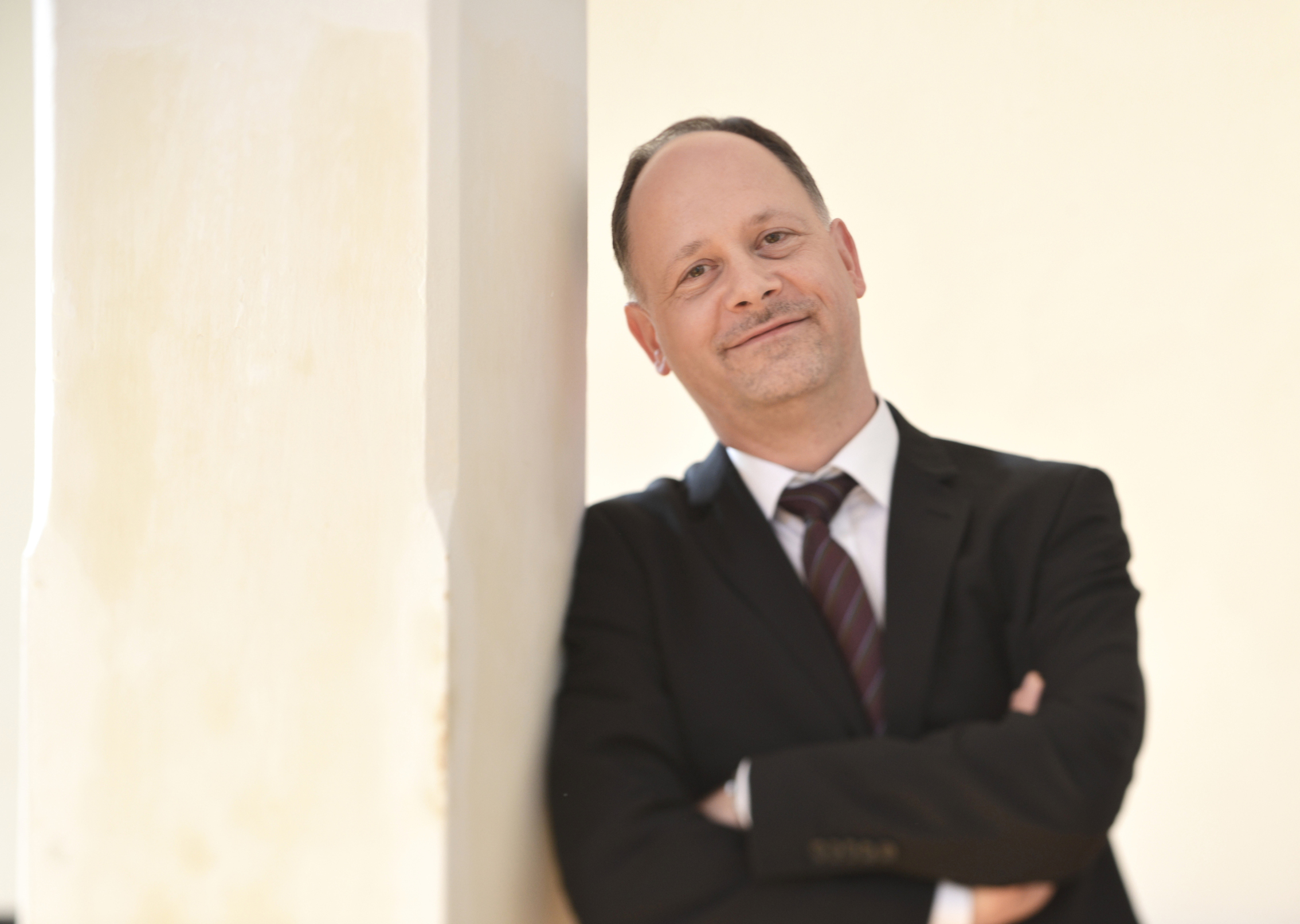
- Lehmann in 2016
- Born: 21 August 1973 (age 53); Malchin, Neubrandenburg District, East Germany
- Education: Hochschule für Musik Carl Maria von Weber Dresden
- Occupation: Choral conductor
- Organizations: Windsbacher Knabenchor; Dresdner Kreuzchor
- Known for: Kreuzkantor
- Title: Kirchenmusikdirektor

Martin Lehmann (born 21 August 1973) is a German choral conductor, especially of boys' choirs. He was a member and artistic assistant of the Dresdner Kammerchor and founded his own chamber choir in Dresden. Lehmann was artistic director of the Windsbacher Knabenchor from 2012 to 2022, touring internationally and making recordings. He then became the 29th Kreuzkantor, the artistic director of the Dresdner Kreuzchor, where he had started his musical career at age 10.

== Life and career ==
Lehmann was born in Malchin on 21 August 1973 and grew up in Dresden, where he became a member of the Dresdner Kreuzchor in 1983, singing with them until 1992. His father and his brothers were also members of the boys' choir. After completing school with the Abitur, Lehmann performed civilian service in Hamburg and spent a year in South America. He studied at the Hochschule für Musik Carl Maria von Weber Dresden from 1995, first musicology, then choral conducting with Hans-Christoph Rademann. During this time he became a member and artistic assistant to the Dresdner Kammerchor chamber choir. He co-founded and directed a chamber choir, cantamus dresden, formed mostly by former members of the Kreuzcor.

Lehmann received a Rudolf Mauersberger scholarship in 2000. While lecturing at the Musikhochschule from 2000 to 2005, he undertook advanced studies from 2001, in choral conducting with Rademann and in orchestral conducting with Georg Sandmann. He completed both with distinction in 2004.

In November 2001, Lehmann became leader of the girls' choir of the Schola Cantorum Leipzig. He was musical director of the Wuppertaler Kurrende boys' choir from 2005.

=== Windsbacher Knabenchor ===
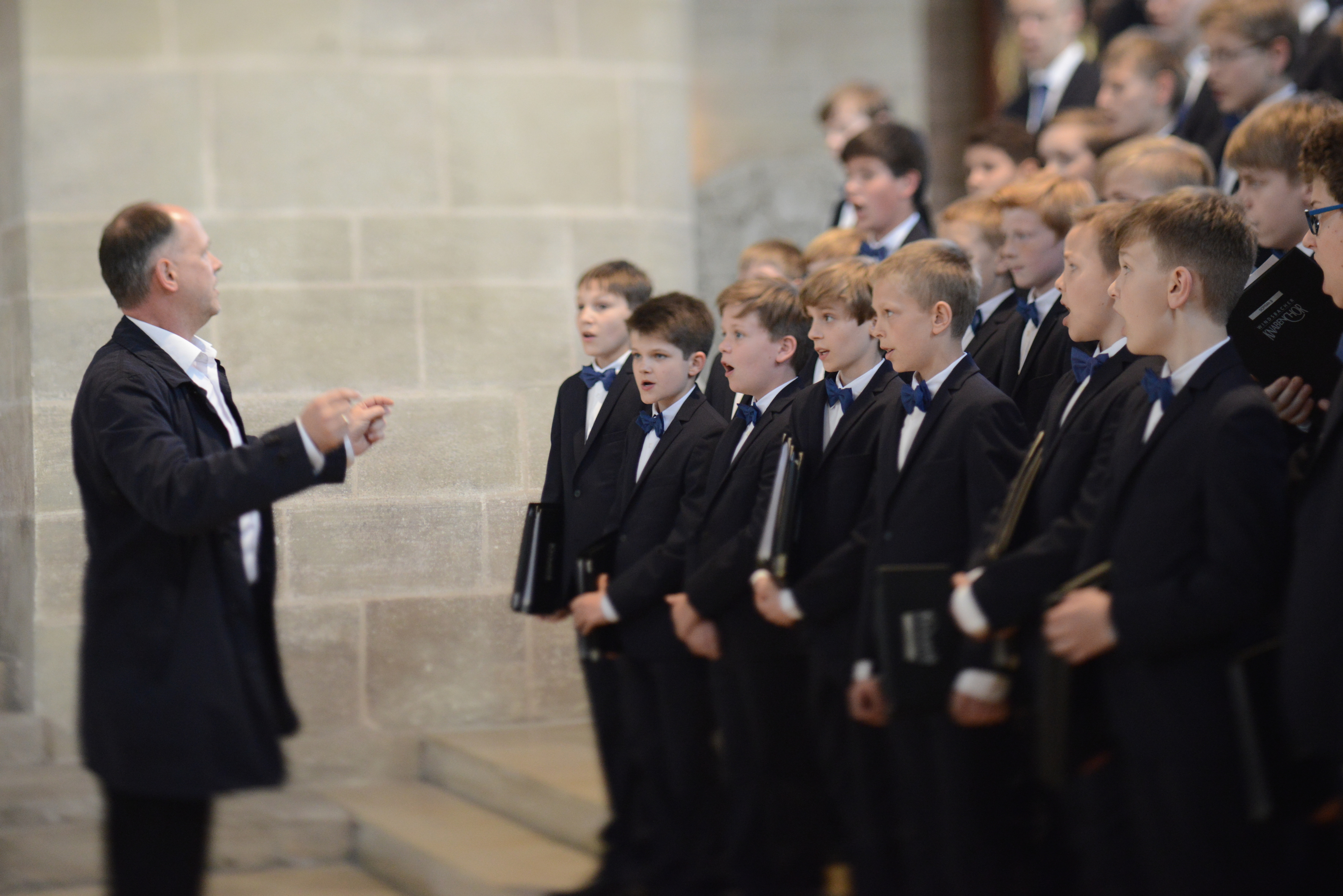
Leading the Windsbacher Knabenchor, 2018

In 2012 Lehmann succeeded Karl-Friedrich Beringer as artistic director of the Windsbacher Knabenchor. They took part in notable festivals, including the Bachwoche Ansbach and the Festival Europäische Kirchenmusik. They performed regularly at venues such as the Alte Oper in Frankfurt, the Konzerthaus Berlin, the der Elbphilharmonie, the Thomaskirche in Leipzig, the Frauenkirche in Dresden, the Herkulessaal in Munich and the Festspielhaus Baden-Baden. They toured to the United States, India and China, the Concertgebouw in Amsterdam, the Oriental Arts Center in Shanghai, the Tonhalle Zürich, the Palau de la Música Catalana in Barcelona, and the Sistine Chapel and the St. Peter's Basilica in Rom.

Lehmann worked with orchestras including the Freiburger Barockorchester, the Akademie für Alte Musik Berlin, the Ensemble 1704 Prag, the Concerto Palatino and the WDR Big Band. He became Kirchenmusikdirektor (KMD) in 1917, honouring his continuous work with the boys, who became an ambassador for the region in Germany and abroad.

=== Kreuzkantor ===
In 2021, Lehmann was chosen the 29th Kreuzkantor of the Dresdner Kreuzchor, while 36 others had also applied for the position, succeeding Roderich Kreile. He took up his office on 1 September 2022. In his first vespers with the choir, he combined works by Schütz and Bach with compositions by predecessors as Kreuzkantor from three centuries, Gottfried August Homilius, Oskar Wermann and Rudolf Mauersberger, and a world premiere, an introit by Wilfried Krätzschmar.

Lehmann with the Dresdner Kreuzchor at Eberbach Abbey, 2026

In a 2023 concert at the Konzerthaus Berlin, they performed a cappella works for Advent by Reger, Britten, Grieg, Praetorius and Mendelssohn combined with Bach's Christmas Oratorio. In a 2025 concert there, he prepared the Christmas Oratorio performing works by Rheinberger, Morten Lauridsen, Eric Whitacre and Alice Tegnér. In 2026 he led the Kreuzchor with soloists and the Dresden Philharmonic in Mendelssohn's Lobgesang at home and in the closing concert of the Rheingau Musik Festival at Eberbach Abbey.

Lehmann is a resident of Dresden-Leubnitz-Neuostra.

== Recordings ==
- Bach: Christmas Oratorio, cantatas IV to VI, 2015 (Windsbacher Knabenchor, Sony Classical)
- Johann Staden Motetten, 2015 (Windsbacher Knabenchor, Sony Classical)
- Bach: Christmas Oratorio, cantatas I to VI, 2016 (Windsbacher Knabenchor, Sony Classical)
- Water & Spirit, 2019 (Windsbacher Knabenchor, Sony Classical)
- Poulenc: Gloria, Schubert: Mass No. 5, 2025 (Dresdner Kreuzchor)
- Sven Helbig: Requiem A, 2025 (Dresdner Kreuzchor)
