= Siegfried Oechsle =

German musicologist

Siegfried Oechsle (born 1956) is a German musicologist.

== Life ==
Oechsle studied musicology, art history and philosophy at the universities of Kiel and Copenhagen. In 1985 he became M. A. at the University of Kiel with his "Studien zum symphonischen Frühwerk Niels Gade". He then worked as a research assistant at the Musicological Institute. In 1989 he was awarded his Doctorate with a work under the title "Symphony after Beethoven. Studies on Schubert, Schumann, Mendelssohn and Gade".

After his habilitation in 1995 ("Bachs Arbeit am strengen Satz. Studien zum Kantatenwerk") he was first senior assistant, then from 1999 professor of musicology at the University of Copenhagen (successor to John Bergsagel). In 2001 he was appointed to the chair of musicology as full professor of musicology at the Christian-Albrechts-Universität zu Kiel (successor to Friedhelm Krummacher. Since 2011 he has been a full member of the Academia Europaea.

== Publications ==
- Kunstreligion und Musik : 1800-1900-2000.
- Intensive und extensive Zeitweisen der Form : Symphonische Monumentalität bei Schubert und Brahms.
- Von Schönberg zu Mozart : Versuch über den Prozesscharakter Mozartscher Musik.
