= Christian Ehregott Weinlig =

German composer and cantor

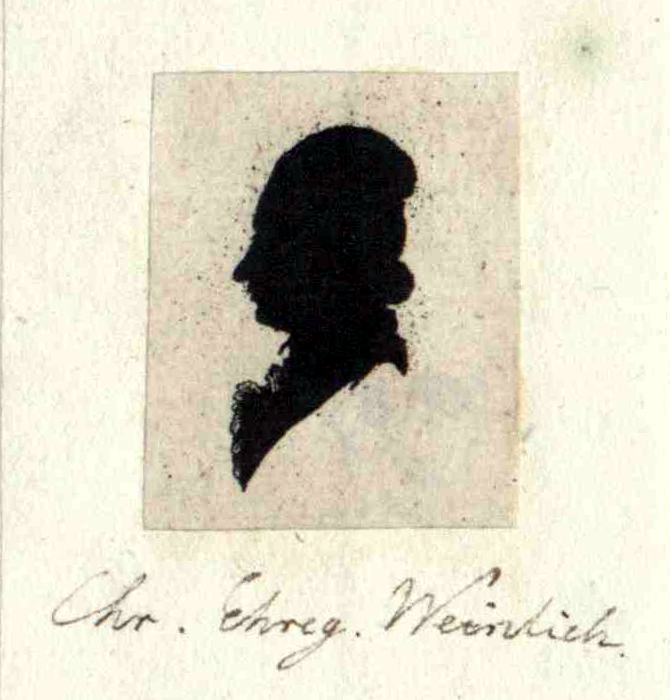
{Christian Ehregott Weinlig

Christian Ehregott Weinlig (September 30, 1743 – March 14, 1813) was a German composer and cantor of Dresden's Kreuzkirche.

Born in Dresden, Weinlig received his musical training at the city's Kreuzschule from Gottfried August Homilius, and from the University of Leipzig in 1765. From 1767 to 1773 he was organist of the Reformed Church in Leipzig. From 1780 he was an accompanist for Italian opera and an organist for the Frauenkirche in Dresden. From 1785 to his death he served as Cantor of the Kreuzkirche and Kreuzschule in Dresden.

Weinlig wrote several operas, oratorios ("Der Christ am Grabe Jesu"), cantatas ("Augusta"), hymns, pieces for piano, and sonatas in a sentimental style.

His nephew, Christian Theodor Weinlig, was also a composer.
