= Martin Flämig =

German church musician and cantor

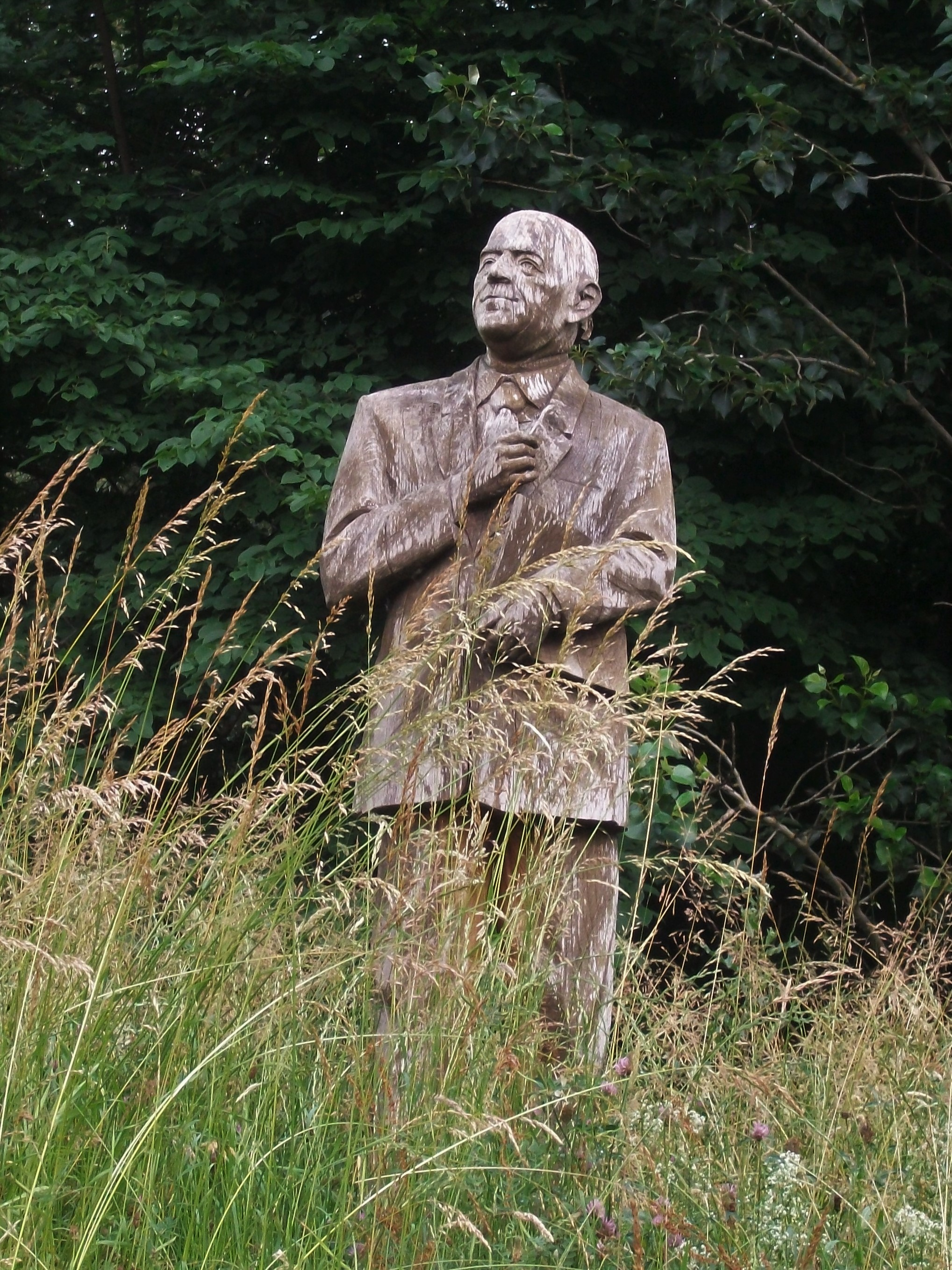
- Statue of Flämig in his birthplace of Aue, Saxony
- Born: 19 August 1913; Aue, German Empire
- Died: 13 January 1998 (aged 84); Dresden, Germany
- Occupations: Choral conductor; Kreuzkantor; Academic teacher
- Organization: Dresdner Kreuzchor

Martin Flämig (19 August 1913, in Aue – 13 January 1998, in Dresden) was a German church musician, and the cantor of the Dresdner Kreuzchor from 1971 to 1991.

== Biography ==
Martin Flämig studied since 1934 in Dresden with Alfred Stier and in Leipzig at the Kirchenmusikalisches Institut des Leipziger Konservatoriums with Karl Straube, Günther Ramin, and Johann Nepomuk David. He was since 1948 cantor at the Versöhnungskirche in Dresden and premiered there Willy Burkhard's oratorio Das Gesicht des Jesaja (The Vision of Isaiah), Ernst Krenek's Lamentationes Jeremiae Prophetae and Johannes Drießler's Dein Reich komme.

In 1953 he was appointed professor of the Hochschule für Musik Dresden. He was a teacher at the Bern Conservatory since 1959. In 1971 he was appointed Dresdner Kreuzkantor as the successor of Rudolf Mauersberger and held the post until 1991.
