= Dieter Härtwig =

German dramaturge and musicologist

Dieter Härtwig (18 July 1934 – 30 December 2022) was a German dramaturge, musicologist and author of numerous writings on Dresden's music history and its personalities.

== Biography ==
Dieter Härtwig was born in Dresden on 18 July 1934.

After gaining his Abitur from Kreuzschule, Härtwig studied musicology and German literature at the University of Leipzig. He was awarded a doctorate in 1963 with a dissertation on Rudolf Wagner-Régeny.

He worked as a dramaturg at the Mecklenburgisches Staatstheater Schwerin and at the Landesbühnen Sachsen in Radebeul. From 1965 to 1997 he was chief dramaturg of the Dresden Philharmonic, and for many years he was also deputy artistic director.

The honorary professor at the Institute for Musicology of the Hochschule für Musik Carl Maria von Weber has written numerous articles and contributions, for example on the Dresden Philharmonic and the Dresdner Kreuzchor; he has also written numerous biographies of artists. He was also involved in the Dresden Music Festival, the Sächsischer Musikrat and was on the board of trustees of the Saxon State and University Library Dresden.

== Publications ==
- Die Dresdner Philharmonie. Altis, Leipzig 1992, ISBN 3-910195-04-0.
- as editor: 125 Jahre Dresdner Philharmonie 1870–1995. DZA Verlag, 1995, ISBN 9783980422659.
- together with Matthias Herrmann: Der Dresdner Kreuzchor – Geschichte und Gegenwart, Wirkungsstätten und Schule. Evangelische Verlagsanstalt, Leipzig 2006, ISBN 3-374-02402-5.
