= Christian Theodor Weinlig =

German music teacher, composer, and choir conductor

Christian Theodor Weinlig (July 25, 1780 – March 7, 1842) was a German music teacher, composer, and choir conductor, active in Dresden and Leipzig.

== Biography ==
Born in Dresden, Weinlig initially studied and then practised law until 1803. He then began musical training with his uncle Christian Ehregott Weinlig, with whom he studied for two years before travelling to Bologna to study with Stanislao Mattei in 1806. From 1814 to 1817, he worked as Cantor of the Kreuzkirche in Dresden. In 1823, he became Cantor of the Thomanerchor in Leipzig, an office he kept until his death.

Among his most well-known pupils were pianist Clara Schumann and composer Richard Wagner; he taught Wagner at Saint Thomas school in Leipzig.

In 1877, Wagner recalled Weinlig's teaching style to Edward Dannreuther:

Weinlig had no special method, but he was clear headed and practical. Indeed, you cannot teach composition... all you can do is, to point to some working example, some particular piece, set a task in that direction, and correct the pupil's work. This is what Weinlig did with me. He chose a piece, generally something of Mozart's, drew attention to its construction, relative length and balance of sections, principal modulations, number and quality of themes, and general character of the movement. Then he set the task: you shall write about so many bars, divide into so many sections with modulations to correspond so and so, the themes shall be so many, and of such and such a character. Similarly he would set contrapuntal exercises, canons, fugues — he analysed an example minutely and then gave simple directions how I was to go to work. With infinite kindness he would put his finger on some defective bit and explain the why and wherefore of the alterations he thought desirable. I readily saw what he was aiming at and soon managed to please him ... music should be taught all round on such a simple plan.
