= O Herr, mache mich zum Werkzeug deines Friedens (Hessenberg) =

"O Herr, mache mich zum Werkzeug deines Friedens" (O lord, make me an instrument of your peace), Op. 37/1, is a motet by Kurt Hessenberg for a six-part mixed choir a cappella, composed in 1946. The composition is a setting of a prayer which the composer took for a work by Francis of Assisi at the time of the composition, therefore it was subtitled "Motette nach Worten des Franz von Assisi“ (Motet after words by Francis of Assisi). He understood later that the famous prayer is much younger.

The motet was first performed in Essen-Werden in 1948. It was published by Schott.
