= Hans John (musicologist) =

German musicologist (born 1936)

- Born: Hans Karl Ferdinand John; 7 September 1936 (age 89); Bad Freienwalde, Brandenburg, Germany
- Occupations: Musicologist and former university professor

Hans Karl Ferdinand John (born 7 September 1936) is a German musicologist and former university professor.

== Life ==
John was born in Bad Freienwalde. His father was cantor and organist and enabled him to attend the Dresdner Kreuzschule. He was a member of the Dresdner Kreuzchores from 1946 until his Abitur in 1954. He studied music education and science and classical philology at the Martin Luther University of Halle-Wittenberg and at the Humboldt University of Berlin. In 1961 he was awarded his doctorate under Fritz Reuter at the Faculty of Philosophy in Berlin with the dissertation Music education in ancient Greece and its relevance for our time.

After his Staatsexamen he taught at the Humboldt University and at the Hochschule für Musik Franz Liszt, Weimar. He then worked for 25 years at the Hochschule für Musik Carl Maria von Weber Dresden as a lecturer and professor of musicology. In 1993 he was appointed director of the Institute for Musicology at the Dresden university. of which he was the founder.

John's research focuses on historical musicology of the 19th century, the music history of Dresden, Protestant church music and the Romantic music.

Hans John has published numerous musicological articles, among others on Carl Maria von Weber, Robert Schumann, Franz Liszt, Karol Lipiński, Richard Wagner and the history of the Hochschule für Musik Carl Maria von Weber Dresden. John has also published several series on Dresden's music history.

John was vice chairman of the International Carl Maria von Weber Society, member of the Sächsischer Musikrat and chairman of the Dresden Society of Friends of Music. He participated as a speaker at numerous international musicological congresses, among others in Oxford, Sintra, Copenhagen St. Petersburg, Breslau, Berlin and Dresden.

== Publications ==
- Editor and co-editor of numerous publication series and congress reports.
- Der Dresdner Kreuzkantor und Bach-Schüler Gottfried August Homilius. Ein Beitrag zur Musikgeschichte Dresdens im 18. Jahrhundert. Hans Schneider, Tutzing 1980, ISBN 978-3-7952-0292-7.
- Der Dresdner Kreuzchor und seine Kantoren, Berlin 1982 and 1984.
- Hans John: Musikstadt Weimar, Deutscher Verlag für Musik, Leipzig 1985 and 1987.
- Michael Heinemann and Hans John (ed.): Die Dresdner Oper im 19. Jahrhundert. (Musik in Dresden, 1), Laaber 1995.
- John, Hans (2002). Richard Strauss: Essays zu Leben und Werk. Laaber. ISBN 978-3-89007-527-3.
- Michael Heinemann and Hans John (ed.): Die Dresdner Oper im 20. Jahrhundert (Musik in Dresden, 7), Laaber 2005.

== Honours ==
- 1990: Martin-Andersen-Nexö-Kunstpreis, Dresden
- 2012: Ehrensenator der Hochschule für Musik Carl Maria von Weber Dresden.
- 2016: Max-Reger-Symposion zu Ehren des 80. Geburtstages
