= Carmen Ottner =

Austrian musicologist

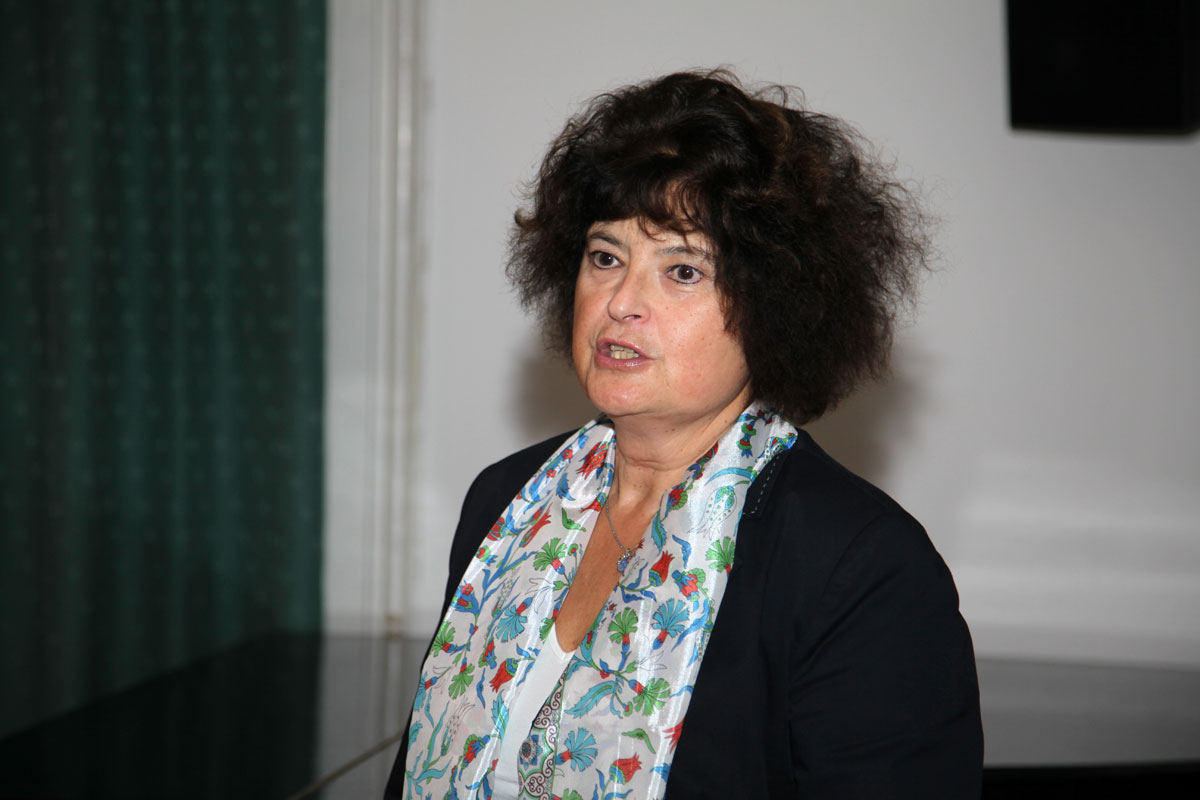
Carmen Ottner (2013)

Carmen Ottner (born in the 20th-century in Vienna) is an Austrian musicologist, Theatre studies and General Secretary of the Franz Schmidt association.

== Life ==
Ottner was born as the daughter of trombonist Franz Bahner ([Vienna Philharmonic]). She studied musicology, theatre studies and philosophy at the University of Vienna. She wrote her dissertation on Das Wort-Toneproblem in den Klavierlieder Wilhelm Kienzls and received her doctorate in 1974.

Since 1985 she has been Secretary General of the Franz Schmidt Society, has published a number of articles on Schmidt and his environment, and has organized conferences. Ottner is also managing director of the Austrian Society for Music and was a member of the editorial board of the Österreichische Musikzeitschrift. She has also written numerous encyclopedia articles and essays on musicological issues.

Ottner is also the editor of Studien zu Franz Schmidt, a multi-volume musicological series.

== Publications ==
- Das Wort-Tonproblem in den Klavierliedern Wilhelm Kienzls. Dissertation, Vienna University, 1974.
- Was damals als unglaubliche Kühnheit erschien. Franz Schrekers Wiener Kompositionsklasse. Studien zu Wilhelm Grosz, Felix Petyrek and Karol Rathaus, Frankfurt–Berlin–Bern–Brussels–New York–Vienna : Lang 2000
- Quellen zu Franz Schmidt – 1. Autographen, Drucke, Handschriften, Briefe in Wiener öffentlichen Sammlungen, 1985
- Quellen zu Franz Schmidt – 2. Briefe, Autographen, Aufzeichnungen im Privatbesitz, Erinnerungen, 1987

== Publisher, editorial activity ==
- Carmen Ottner (edit.): Franz Schmidt und die österreichische Orgelmusik seiner Zeit: Symposion 1991. Doblinger, Vienna 1992, ISBN 3-900695-24-5
- Carmen Ottner (edit.): Musik in Wien 1938–1945. Symposion 2004. Studien zu Franz Schmidt XV, Vienna 2004, ISBN 978-3-900695-87-3
