= Windsbacher Knabenchor =

- Choir
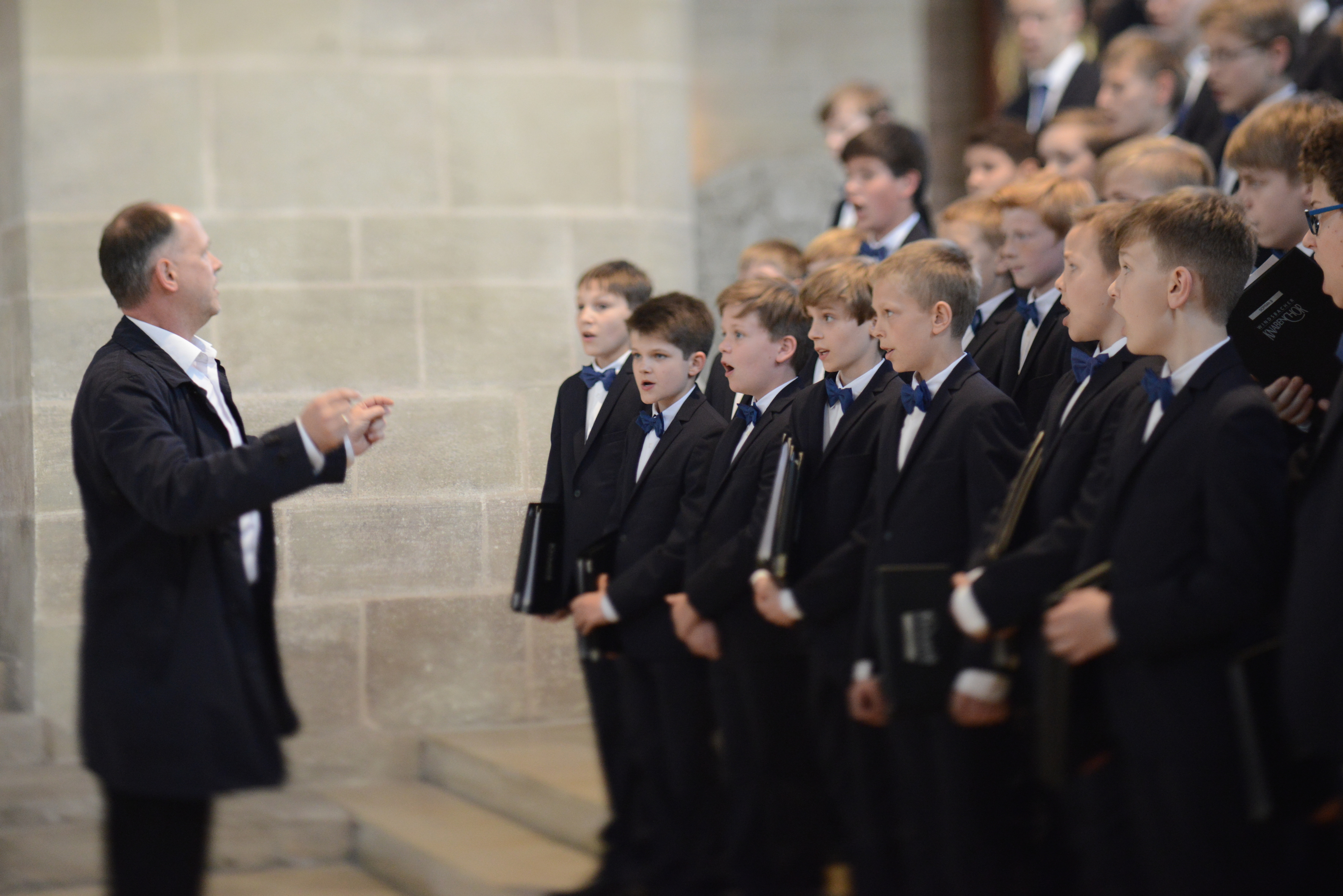
- Windsbacher Knabenchor with Martin Lehmann in 2018
- Origin: Windsbach
- Founded: 1946
- Founder: Hans Thamm
- Chief conductor: Ludwig Böhme
- Website: www.windsbacher-knabenchor.de

The Windsbacher Knabenchor (Windsbach Boys' Choir) is a German boys' choir in Windsbach, Bavaria, Germany, founded in 1946 and performing internationally.

== History ==
The choir was founded in 1946 by Hans Thamm and was conducted by Karl-Friedrich Beringer from 1977 for decades. It is regarded as one of the most renowned boys' choirs in the world. The choir is an institution of the Lutheran Church in Bavaria, which raises about 30 percent of the funds required to support both the ensemble and the singers boarding school. The choir received the Rheingau Musik Preis of the Rheingau Musik Festival in 2007. From 2011, Martin Lehmann was artistic director of the choir. In July 2021 Lehmann announced that he would leave the choir and take over the artistic direction of the Dresdner Kreuzchor. As his successor Ludwig Böhme took over the direction of the choir on September 1, 2022.

== Repertoire and performances ==
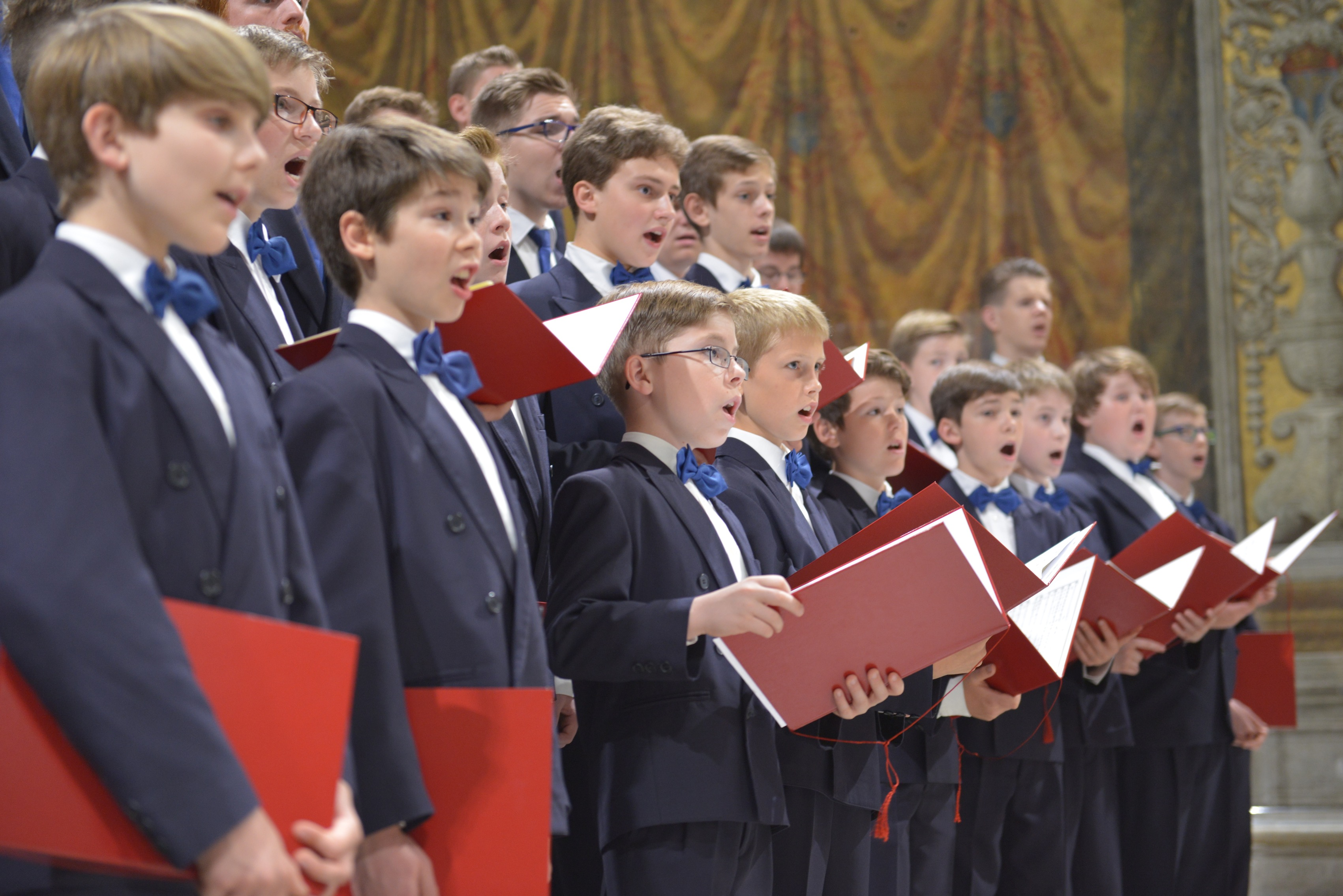
Concert in the Sistine Chapel

The choir's repertoire spans from a cappella to great oratorios such as the Handel's Messiah and Mendelssohn's Elijah. With about 70 singers, the choir performs about 50 concerts per year. This includes going on tour once or twice per year to locations such as other European countries, the Middle East, Far East, the United States and South America. The choir accompanied the Presidents of Germany Richard von Weizsäcker and Roman Herzog on their state visits and held a concert for Johannes Rau.

== Education ==
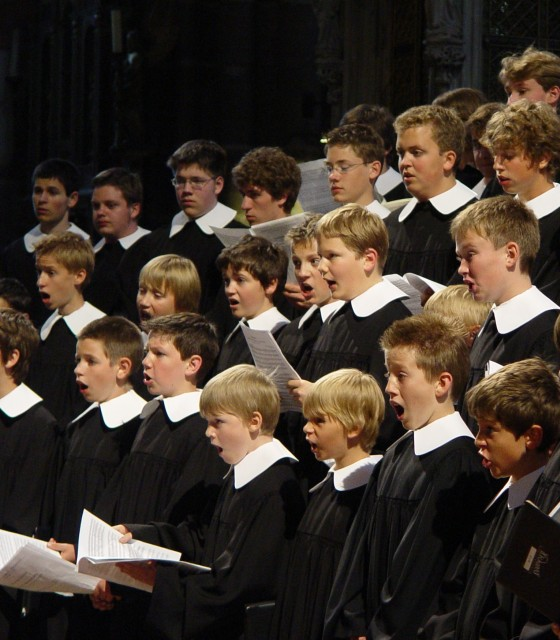
Choir boys wearing their traditional copes

At school, the young singers are specially supported in so called "choir classes" of the external grammar school "Johann-Sebastian-Bach-Gymnasium". This allows for more flexibility in responding to the special needs of the singers. The musical education at the boarding school also includes voice training, music theory and of course the daily rehearsals.

In order to ensure proper delivery of homework and absorption of curriculum content, the younger grades are obliged to attend a daily "study time" at the boarding school. Depending on the proficiency level of an individual student, special enhancement classes are offered by teachers of the grammar school. The purpose of this offer is to enable students to catch up on subject matters they missed due to absence or class cancellations which result from tours or additional rehearsals in preparation of important performances.
