= Augustana Divinity School (Neuendettelsau) =

Divinity school of the Evangelical Lutheran Church in Bavaria

Coordinates: 49°17′00″N 10°46′39″E

Augustana-Hochschule
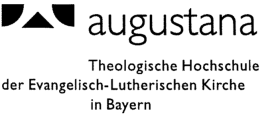
- Established: 1947
- Affiliations: Evangelical Lutheran Church in Bavaria
- Rector: Prof. Dr. Michael Pietsch
- Students: 212 (April 24, 2007)
- Location: Neuendettelsau, Bavaria, Germany
- Website: www.augustana.de

The Augustana-Hochschule Neuendettelsau is a divinity school of the Evangelical Lutheran Church in Bavaria in Neuendettelsau, Germany.

== History ==
The Augustana-Hochschule was founded in 1947 as an outcome of the Church’s struggle with National Socialism upon decision by the Provincial Synod [Landessynode] of the Evangelical-Lutheran Church in Bavaria. In 1949, the Divinity school moved, quite symbolically, into the abandoned barracks that had been part of a former ammunition factory of the Wehrmacht in Neuendettelsau. Since those days, the Augustana-Hochschule has grown considerably as several buildings have been added, including the architecturally fascinating round chapel and the equally interesting shell-shaped library. Still, the Divinity school with its park-like compound has retained its charme as one of the few real campus universities in Germany.

In 1973, the right to award doctoral degrees in cooperation with the theological faculties in Erlangen and Munich was conferred to the Divinity School. Since 1990, the Augustana-Hochschule can award doctoral degrees and Habilitations independently.

== Status and Education ==
The Divinity School is independent of the state, yet recognized by the state. Students usually take up the undergraduate and graduate programs of the Augustana-Hochschule in order to become pastors in the various Landeskirchen (regional churches) in Germany. The Divinity School has got the right to award doctoral degrees and Habilitations. The Augustana-Hochschule is, thus, on par with theological faculties at state universities.

There are six tenured theological professors (Old Testament, New Testament, church history, systematic theology, practical theology, Missionology), as well as one tenured professor for philosophy and, since 2003, one tenured professor for feminist theology. Two lecturers for classical philology (Latin, Ancient Greek) and one lecturer for Biblical Hebrew take care of the students' education in the old languages. Additionally, several assistant professors and adjunct lecturers contribute to the variety of undergraduate and graduate courses.

== Current Professors ==
- Heike Walz, professor for intercultural theology (since 2016)
- Markus Buntfuß, professor for systematic theology (since 2006)
- Renate Jost, professor for feminist theology (since 2003)
- Peter L. Oesterreich, professor for philosophy (since 1995)
- Klaus Raschzok, professor for practical theology (since 2003)
- Gury Schneider-Ludorff, professor for church history (since 2005)
- Christian Strecker, professor for New Testament (since 2010)
- Michael Pietsch, professor for Old Testament (since 2014)

== Cooperations and Contacts ==
The Divinity School has close ties with the church’s social and welfare work and with its missionary work.

Furthermore, there are good contacts with the nearby Theological Faculty of the Catholic University of Eichstätt-Ingolstadt, the MF Norwegian School of Theology in Oslo (Norway) and the Wartburg Theological Seminary, Dubuque, Iowa. The school also maintains connections with the Evangelical Lutheran Churches of Papua New Guinea, Brazil, Tanzania and Zaire through a scholarship program.

== Literature ==
- Jörg Dittmer (ed.): Theologie auf dem Campus. 50 Jahre Augustana-Hochschule, Neuendettelsau 1997. (German)
- Gerhard Monninger (ed.): Eine Denkwerkstatt der Kirche. Augustana-Hochschule 1947-1987, München 1987. (German)
- Gerhard Monninger (ed.): 30 Jahre Augustana-Hochschule - einen Augenblick innehalten, Neuendettelsau 1977. (German)
