= Wer Dank opfert, der preiset mich, BWV 17 =

Church cantata by Johann Sebastian Bach

Wer Dank opfert, der preiset mich
- BWV 17
- Church cantata by J. S. Bach
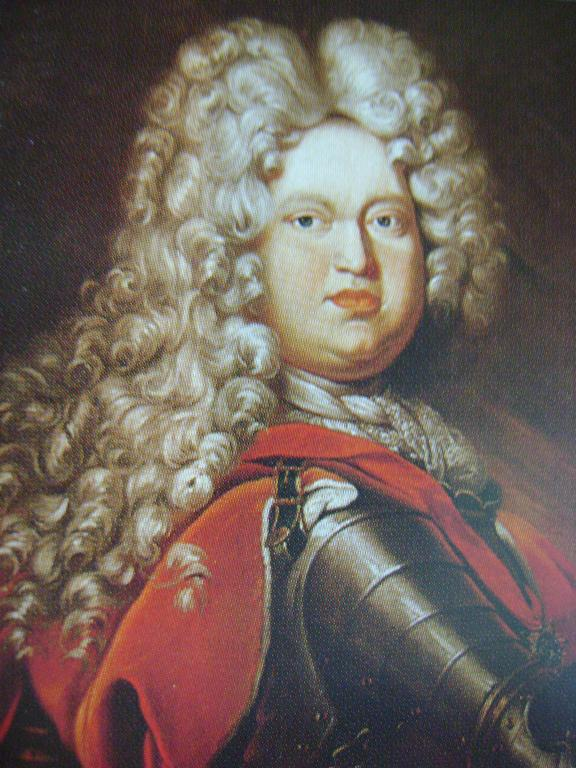
- Ernst Ludwig, Duke of Saxe-Meiningen, probably the author of the text
- Related: Missa in G major, BWV 236
- Occasion: 14th Sunday after Trinity
- Cantata text: Ernst Ludwig
- Bible text: Psalms 50:23; Luke 17:16
- Chorale: Nun lob, mein Seel, den Herren
- Performed: 22 August 1726: Leipzig
- Movements: 7 in two parts
- Vocal: SATB choir and solo
- Instrumental: 2 oboes; 2 violins; viola; continuo

Johann Sebastian Bach composed the church cantata Wer Dank opfert, der preiset mich (He who offers thanks praises Me), BWV 17 in Leipzig for the fourteenth Sunday after Trinity and first performed it on 22 September 1726.

In his fourth year as Thomaskantor in Leipzig, Bach performed 18 cantatas composed by his relative Johann Ludwig Bach, a court musician in Meiningen. He then set some of those texts, written probably by Ernst Ludwig, Duke of Saxe-Meiningen, himself, including this cantata. The Meiningen texts follow a pattern: seven movements are divided into two parts, both beginning with biblical quotations, Part I from the Old Testament, Part II from the New Testament.

The text of Wer Dank opfert, der preiset mich is based on the prescribed gospel reading telling of Jesus cleansing ten lepers. It is opened by a verse from Psalm 50, quotes a key sentence from the gospel and is closed by a stanza from Johann Gramann's hymn "Nun lob, mein Seel, den Herren". The cantata, structured in two parts to be performed before and after the sermon, is modestly scored for four vocal soloists and choir (SATB), and a Baroque orchestra of two oboes, strings and continuo. The opening chorus is a complex musical architecture, and the closing chorale has been admired for subtle word painting.

== History and words ==
Bach wrote the cantata in 1726, his fourth year in Leipzig, for the 14th Sunday after Trinity. The prescribed readings for the Sunday were from the Epistle to the Galatians, Paul's teaching on "works of the flesh" and "fruit of the Spirit" (Galatians 5:16–24), and from the Gospel of Luke, Cleansing ten lepers. (Luke 17:11–19).

That year, Bach presented 18 cantatas by his relative Johann Ludwig Bach who was court musician in Meiningen. Bach seems to have been impressed also by the texts of those cantatas and followed similar structures: seven movements, divided into two parts to be performed before and after the sermon, both parts opened by Bible quotations, Part I by a quotation from the Old Testament, Part II by one from the New Testament. Bach composed some Meiningen texts that his relative had set before, including this cantata. According to Christoph Wolff, the texts were written by Ernst Ludwig, Duke of Saxe-Meiningen.

The poet derived from the Gospel the idea that thanks to God for his goodness are man's obligation. A profound scholar of the Bible, he quoted for the opening chorus a verse from Psalm 50 (Psalms 50:23) and for the first recitative in Part II verses 15 and 16 from the Gospel. He alluded to the Bible more, for example telling about God's creation Psalms 19:5 in movement 2 and Psalms 36:6 in movement 3, to Romans 14:17 in movement 6, "Lieb, Fried, Gerechtigkeit und Freud in deinem Geist" (Love, peace, righteousness and joy in Your spirit). The closing chorale is the third stanza of the hymn "Nun lob, mein Seel, den Herren" by Johann Gramann, published in 1540.

Bach led the Thomanerchor in the first performance of the cantata on 22 September 1726. The cantata is regarded as part of Bach's third annual cycle. He later used the opening movement for the movement Cum sancto Spritu in the Gloria of his Missa in G major, BWV 236.

== Music ==
=== Structure and scoring ===
Bach structure the cantata in two parts, Part I of three movements to be performed before the sermon, Part II of four movements after the sermon. He scored it for four vocal soloists (soprano (S), alto (A), tenor (T) and bass (B)), a four-part choir SATB, and a Baroque instrumental ensemble of two oboes (Ob), two violins (Vl), two violas (Va) and basso continuo (Bc). The title of the autograph score reads: "Domin. 14 post Trin. / Wer Dank opfert, der preiset mich / a / 4 Voci / 2 Hautb. / 2 Viol. / Viola / e Contin. / di / J.S.Bach".

In the following table of the movements, the scoring follows the Neue Bach-Ausgabe. The keys and time signatures are taken from Alfred Dürr, using the symbol for common time (4/4).

Movements of Wer Dank opfert, der preiset mich, BWV 17, Part I
No.	Title	Text	Type	Vocal	Winds	Strings	Key	Time
1	Wer Dank opfert, der preiset mich	Psalms 50:23	Chorus	SATB	2Ob	2Vl Va	A major	
2	Es muss die ganze Welt ein stummer Zeuge werden	Ernst Ludwig I	Recitative	A				common time
3	Herr, deine Güte reicht so weit	Ernst Ludwig I	Aria	S		2Vl	E major	

Movements of Wer Dank opfert, der preiset mich, BWV 17, Part II
No.	Title	Text	Type	Vocal	Winds	Strings	Key	Time
4	Einer aber unter ihnen, da er sahe	Luke 17:16	Recitative	T				common time
5	Welch Übermaß der Güte schenkst du mir	Ernst Ludwig I	Aria	T		2Vl Va	D major	common time
6	Sieh meinen Willen an	Ernst Ludwig I	Recitative	B				common time
7	Wie sich ein Vater erbarmet	Gramann	Chorale	SATB	2Ob	2Vl Va		common time

=== Movements ===
==== 1 ====
The opening chorus presents the verse from the psalm, "Wer Dank opfert, der preiset mich" (He who offers thanks praises Me), in two choral sections, preceded by a long instrumental section. Dürr analysed the piece and concluded that it forms a purposeful expansion of the motet style into a "unified architectonic structure". The sinfonia, in tripartite form, presents the material, on which two fugal expositions build. John Eliot Gardiner, who conducted the Bach Cantata Pilgrimage in 2000, described the movement as "exhilarating and florid".

==== 2 ====
The first recitative is secco, as the other two: "Es muß die ganze Welt ein stummer Zeuge werden" (The entire world must be a silent witness).

==== 3 ====
In the first aria, "Herr, deine Güte reicht, so weit der Himmel ist" (Lord, your goodness reaches as wide as Heaven), soprano and two obbligato violins illustrate in rising lines the text "so weit die Wolken gehen" (as far as the clouds soar), adding extended coloraturas on "preisen" (praise) and "weisen" (indicate [the way]). The aria avoids a da capo, probably due to the long text, but offers a return of the ritornello in which the voice participates.

==== 4 ====
The recitative beginning Part II, "Einer aber unter ihnen, da er sahe, daß er gesund worden war" (One, however, among them, when he saw that he was cured), is of narrative character, not as often a quoting Jesus, and is therefore given to the tenor voice, similar to the Evangelist in Bach's Passions.

==== 5 ====
The second aria, "Welch Übermaß der Güte" (What an abundance of goodness), is accompanied by the strings. Both arias share a structure of three vocal sections, again avoiding a full da capo, but having a last section reminiscent of the first. Bach highlighted certain words such as "Dank" (thanks) and "Lob" (praise) by extended coloraturas.

==== 6 ====
The last recitative, "Sieh meinen Willen an" (Look on my will), is sung by the bass. It is accompanied by the continuo alone and expands on the theme of giving thanks to God.

==== 7 ====
The closing chorale is "Wie sich ein Vater erbarmet" (As a father has mercy), in a triple metre. Gardiner admires this movement particularly for its "wonderful word-painting for the 'flower and fallen leaves' and 'the wind [which] only has to pass over'", comparing it to the central movement of the motet Singet dem Herrn ein neues Lied, BWV 225. The Bach scholar Klaus Hofmann summarises that Bach "strikes a note of transience" here.

== Recordings ==
The following table is a selection from the Bach Cantatas website. Ensembles singing one voice per part (OVPP) and playing period instruments are marked by green background.

Recordings of Wer Dank opfert, der preiset mich, BWV 17
Title	Conductor / Choir / Orchestra	Soloists	Label	Year	Choir type	Orch. type
J. S. Bach: Kantaten BWV 110, BWV 17	Hans Thamm Windsbacher Knabenchor Pforzheim Chamber Orchestra	Herrad Wehrung; Emmy Lisken; Georg Jelden; Jakob Stämpfli	Cantate	1961		
Bach: Sacred Cantatas, Vol. 1, BWV 1–14, 16–19	Nikolaus Harnoncourt: Wiener Sängerknaben; Chorus Viennensis; Concentus Musicus Wien	boy soprano of the Wiener Sängerknaben; Paul Esswood; Kurt Equiluz; Max van Egmond	Teldec	1972		Period
Bach Cantatas Vol. 4 – Sundays after Trinity I	Karl Richter Münchener Bach-Chor Münchener Bach-Orchester	Edith Mathis; Julia Hamari; Peter Schreier; Dietrich Fischer-Dieskau	Archiv Produktion	1977		
Die Bach Kantate Vol. 17	Helmuth Rilling Gächinger Kantorei Bach-Collegium Stuttgart	Arleen Auger; Gabriele Schreckenbach; Adalbert Kraus; Walter Heldwein	Hänssler	1982		
Bach Edition Vol. 8 – Cantatas Vol. 3	Pieter Jan Leusink Holland Boys Choir Netherlands Bach Collegium	Ruth Holton; Sytse Buwalda; Knut Schoch; Bas Ramselaar,	Brilliant Classics	1999		Period
Bach Cantatas Vol. 7: Ambronay / Bremen	John Eliot Gardiner Monteverdi Choir English Baroque Soloists	Malin Hartelius; Robin Tyson; James Gilchrist; Peter Harvey	Soli Deo Gloria	2000		Period
J. S. Bach: Complete Cantatas Vol. 17	Ton Koopman Amsterdam Baroque Orchestra & Choir	Sandrine Piau; Bogna Bartosz; Christoph Prégardien; Klaus Mertens	Antoine Marchand	2002		Period
J. S. Bach: Cantatas for the Complete Liturgical Year Vol. 5	Sigiswald Kuijken La Petite Bande	Gerlinde Sämann; Petra Noskaiová; Jan Kobow; Dominik Wörner	Challenge Classics	2006	OVPP	Period
J. S. Bach: Cantatas Vol. 46 – Cantatas from Leipzig 1723 / IV – BWV 46, 95, 136, 138	Masaaki Suzuki Bach Collegium Japan	Hana Blažíková; Robin Blaze; Gerd Türk; Peter Kooy	BIS	2009		Period
