= Wir danken dir, Gott, wir danken dir, BWV 29 =

1731 church cantata by Johann Sebastian Bach

Wir danken dir, Gott, wir danken dir
- BWV 29
- Sacred cantata by J. S. Bach
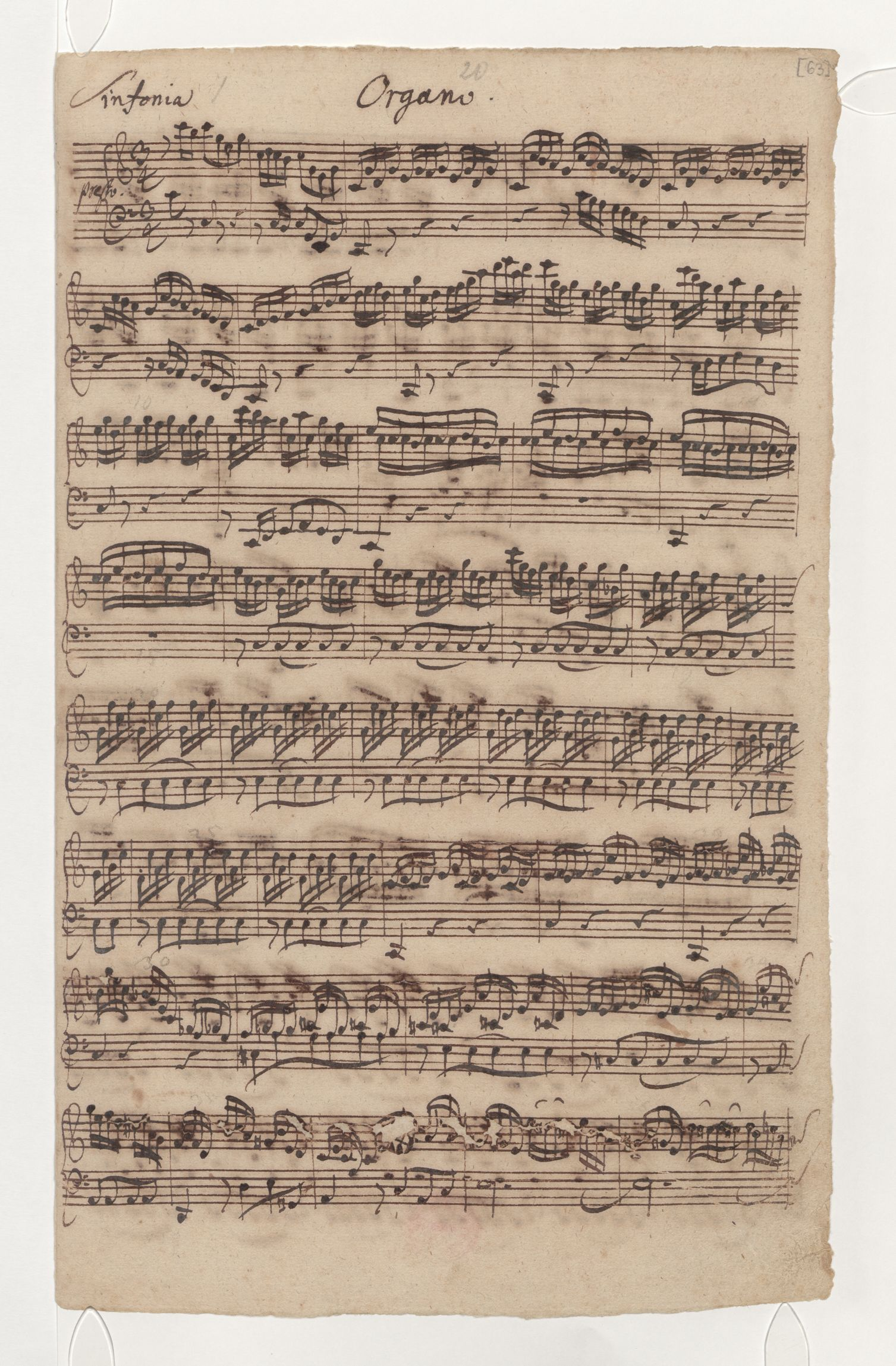
- First page of the autograph manuscript of the organ obbligato part in the opening Sinfonia
- Related: movement 1 based on Partita for violin, BWV 1006; movement 2 basis for Gratias of the Bach's Missa of 1733 and Dona nobis pacem of the Mass in B minor
- Occasion: Ratswechsel
- Bible text: Psalms 75:1
- Chorale: "Nun lob, mein Seel, den Herren" by Johann Gramann
- Performed: 27 August 1731: St. Nicholas Church, Leipzig
- Movements: 8
- Vocal: SATB choir and solo
- Instrumental: 3 trumpets; timpani; 2 oboes; organ; 2 violins; viola; continuo

Wir danken dir, Gott, wir danken dir (We thank you, God, we thank you), BWV 29, is a sacred cantata by Johann Sebastian Bach. He composed it in Leipzig in 1731 for Ratswechsel, the annual inauguration of a new town council, and first performed it on 27 August of that year. The cantata was part of a festive service in the St. Nicholas Church. The cantata text by an unknown author includes in movement 2 the beginning of Psalm 75, and as the closing chorale the fifth stanza of Johann Gramann's "Nun lob, mein Seel, den Herren". Bach scored the work in eight movements for four vocal parts and a festive Baroque orchestra of three trumpets, timpani, two oboes, strings, an obbligato organ and basso continuo. The organ dominates the first movement Sinfonia which Bach derived from a Partita for violin. The full orchestra accompanies the first choral movement and plays with the voices in the closing chorale, while a sequence of three arias alternating with two recitatives is scored intimately.

Bach used the music from the choral movement for both the Gratias agimus tibi and Dona nobis pacem of his Mass in B minor.

== History and words ==
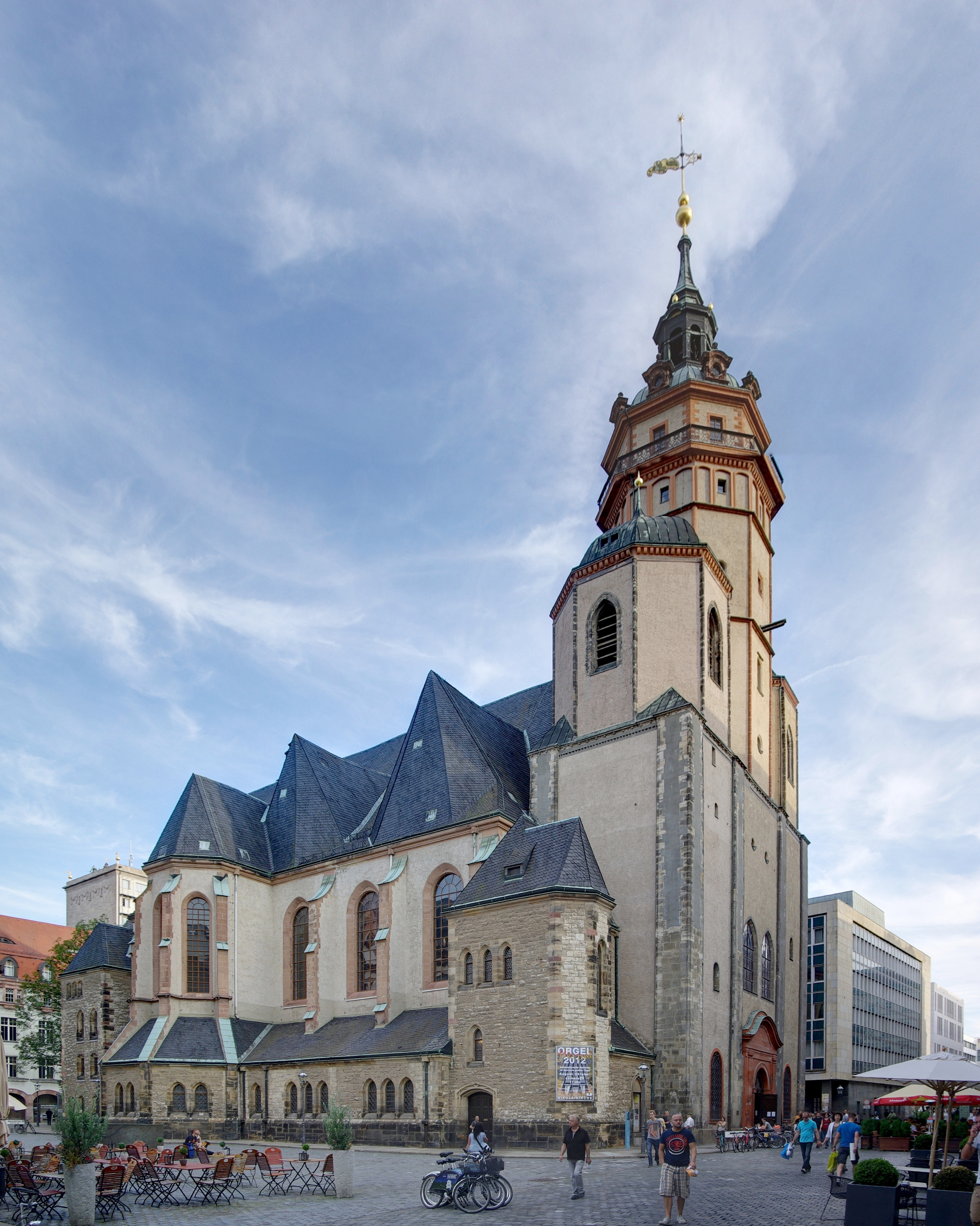
St. Nicholas Church, Leipzig, the regular location of the service celebrating the new council

Bach composed the cantata in 1731 for Ratswechsel, the inauguration of the new town council, which was celebrated annually in a festive service in the St. Nicholas Church on the Monday following the feast day of St. Bartholomew (24 August). It was not a democratic election, but a "ceremonial transfer of office" of council members who were appointed. The service was not part of the liturgical year with cantata texts related to prescribed biblical epistle and gospel readings. For the same occasion, Bach had already written the cantata Preise, Jerusalem, den Herrn, BWV 119, in his first year in Leipzig, 1723. For the Ratswechsel service, he could count on the entire council (his employer) listening, probably also civil servants and representatives of the Elector's administration for the region. The musicologist Klaus Hofmann notes: "It was an opportunity for Bach to show how sacred music was flourishing under his direction and to present himself as a composer."

The cantata text of Wir danken dir, Gott by an unknown author includes in movement 2 the first verse of Psalm 75 (Psalm 75:1) and as the closing chorale the fifth stanza of Johann Gramann's hymn of praise "Nun lob, mein Seel, den Herren" (1540).

Bach first performed the cantata on 27 August 1731. In 1733, he adapted the music of the first choral movement with only minor changes for the Gratias agimus tibi of his Kyrie-Gloria Mass for the Dresden court, on a text expressing the same idea in Latin. According to Hofmann, the movement is based on an earlier lost composition.

Bach performed the cantata for Ratswechsel at least two more times, on 31 August 1739 and on 25 August 1749. He expanded the Missa of 1733 to his Mass in B minor and concluded his work by repeating the music as the Dona nobis pacem.

== Scoring and structure ==
The cantata is structured in eight movements and takes about 28 minutes to perform. The instrumentation reflects the festive occasion for which it was written. Bach scored the work for four vocal soloists (soprano (S), alto (A), tenor (T) and bass) (B), a four-part choir, and a Baroque orchestra of three trumpets (Tr), timpani (Ti), two oboes (Ob), two violins (Vl) (violin solo in movement 3), violas (Va), an obbligato organ (Org) and basso continuo (Bc). The autograph score is titled: "Bey der Rahts-Wahl / 1731. / Wir dancken dir, Gott, wir dancken dir. / à / 4 Voci. / 3 Trombe / Tamburi / 2 Hautbois / 2 Violini / Viola / e / Continuo / con Organo obligato / di / Joh.Seb:Bach.

In the following table of the movements, the scoring follows the Neue Bach-Ausgabe, and the abbreviations for voices and instruments the list of Bach cantatas. The time signature is provided using the symbol for common time (4/4). The timpani are listed with the trumpets because they always play together.

No.	Type	Text	Text source	Vocal	Brass	Wood	Strings	Organ/ Bass	Key	Time
1	Sinfonia				3Tr Ti	2Ob	2Vl Va	Org Bc	D major	3/4
2	Chorus	Wir danken dir, Gott, wir danken dir	Psalm	SATB	3Tr Ti	2Ob	2Vl Va	Bc	D major	
3	Aria	Halleluja, Stärk und Macht	anon.	T			Vl solo	Bc	A major	cut time
4	Recitative	Gottlob! es geht uns wohl!	anon.	B				Bc	F-sharp minor – E minor	common time
5	Aria	Gedenk an uns mit deiner Liebe	anon.	S		Ob	2Vl Va	Bc	B minor	6/8
6	Recitative	Vergiß es ferner nicht mit deiner Hand	anon.	A SATB				Bc	D major – D major	common time
7	Aria	Halleluja, Stärk und Macht	anon.	A				Org Bc	D major	6/8
8	Chorale	Sei Lob und Preis mit Ehren	Gramann	SATB	3Tr Ti	2Ob	2Vl Va	Bc	D major	3/4

== Music ==
=== 1 ===
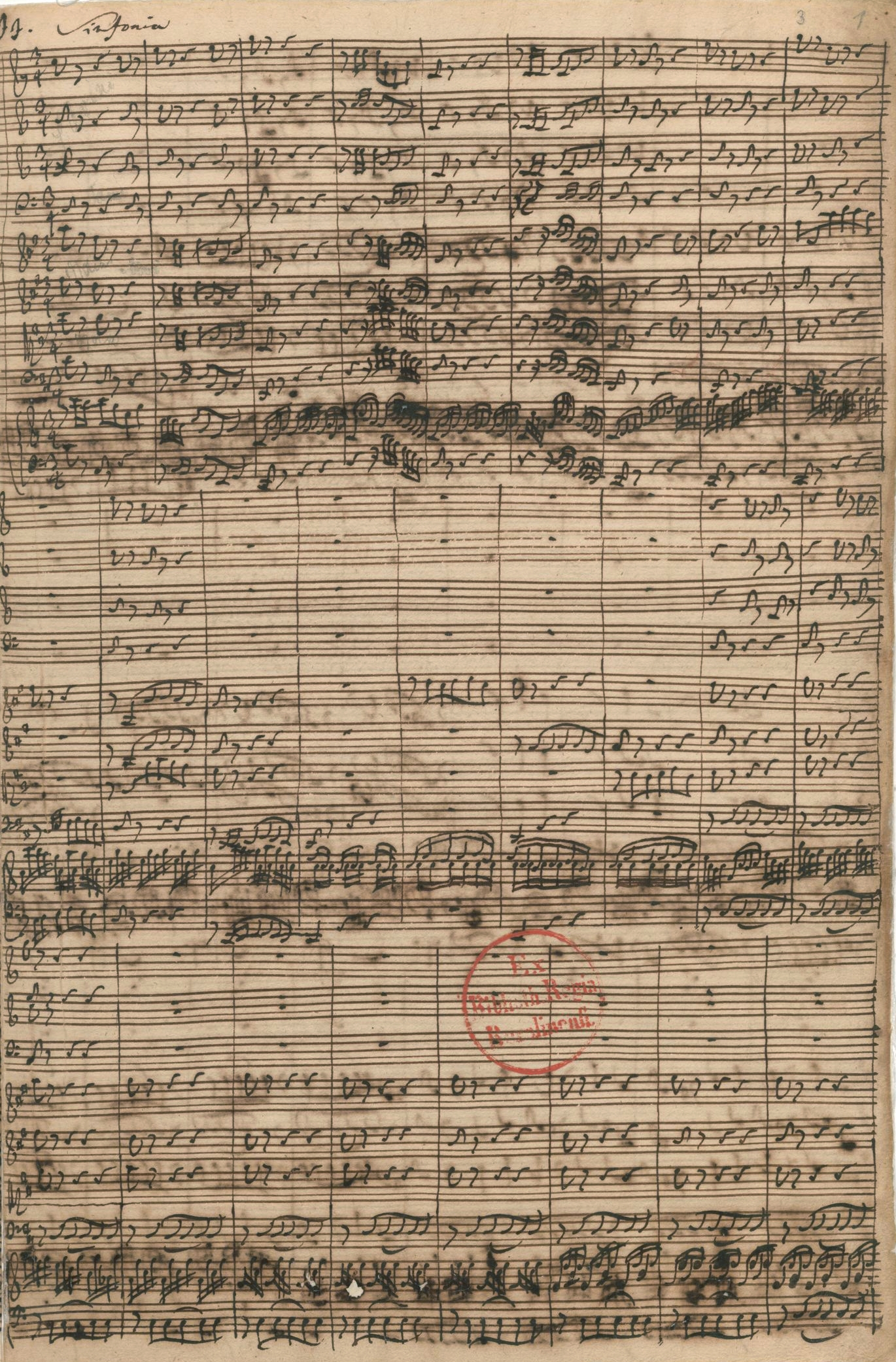
The first page of the autograph manuscript, Sinfonia

The cantata is one of few sacred Bach cantatas opened by an orchestral sinfonia. Another is the early Weinen, Klagen, Sorgen, Zagen, BWV 12. The music is an arrangement of the prelude from Bach's Partita for violin, BWV 1006, which Bach had already revised for organ and strings in 1729 for the wedding cantata Herr Gott, Beherrscher aller Dinge, BWV 120a. In the cantata for Ratswechsel, the solo organ plays the original violin part "in virtuoso motoric writing", while the full orchestra adds an accompaniment.

=== 2 ===
The first vocal movement is a setting of verse 1 of Psalm 75, "Wir danken dir, Gott, wir danken dir, und verkündigen deine Wunder", translated in the King James version of the bible as "Unto thee, O God, do we give thanks, unto thee do we give thanks: for that thy name is near thy wondrous works declare". In contrast to the virtuoso introduction, the chorus begins in motet style in grave stile antico. The bass begins in great simplicity a theme in even steps; the tenor starts imitating almost immediately, the alto a little later, then the soprano. A countersubject illustrates the telling of God's wonders, embellishing the words verkündigen ("declare") and Wunder ("wondrous works"). In the beginning only oboes and strings play colla parte with the voices, then a trumpet doubles the soprano. Developing further, two trumpets take part in the polyphony, and a climax is reached when the third trumpet and timpani enter. Hofmann comments that although the movement begins in old style, "Bach’s method of intensification (by means of which he gradually introduces trumpets and ultimately allows the theme to be heard in stretta) is thoroughly baroque.

=== 3 ===
"Halleluja, Stärk und Macht" (Alleluia, strength and power) is set as an aria for tenor. The voice, a solo violin and the continuo are equal partners.

=== 4 ===
A recitative for bass, "Gottlob! es geht uns wohl!" (Praise God! It is well for us!) mentions that God "holds his hand protectively and in blessing above the city".

=== 5 ===
The soprano aria is a prayer, "Gedenk an uns mit deiner Liebe" (Consider us with Your love)‘’ (‘Think of us with your love’) for "God’s future providence", described by Hofmann as "a musical display piece full of warmth and tenderness in a rocking siciliano rhythm. For long stretches in the vocal sections, Bach does without a continuo accompaniment (thus without the instrumental bass register) – a tactic that effectively contributes to creating a sonic impression of tenderness and charm".

=== 6 ===
A recitative for alto is a prayer for future protection, "Vergiß es ferner nicht, mit deiner Hand" (Do not forget later, with Your hand), concluded by a choral Amen in unison. The surprise is an interpretation of a line quoted from Deuteronomy 27:1526, "und alles Volk soll sagen: Amen!" (And all the people shall answer and say, Amen.).

=== 7 ===
The alto performs the last aria, "Halleluja, Stärk und Macht" (Hallelujah, power and might)‘’, repeating and reinforcing the thoughts of the first. The music repeats the main section of the tenor aria, now accompanied by the organ. This close connection within the structure of the work of both the theme (3 and 7) and the instrument (1 and 7) is unusual in Bach's cantatas.

=== 8 ===
In the closing chorale, "Sei Lob und Preis mit Ehren" (Glory, and praise with honor) trumpets and timpani accentuate the ends of some lines of the fifth verse of Johann Gramann's "Nun lob, mein Seel, den Herren".

== Recordings ==
The entries of the following table are taken from the Bach Cantatas website.

Recordings of Wir danken dir, Gott, wir danken dir
Title	Conductor / Choir / Orchestra	Soloists	Label	Year	Orch. type
Radio Recording – Archiv-Nr: U0-03176	Max Thurn Members of NDR Chor Members of Hamburger Rundfunkorchester	Margot Guilleaume; Ursula Zollenkopf; Hans-Joachim Rotzsch; Horst Sellentin	NDR	1958	
J. S. Bach: Cantatas BWV 29 & BWV 135	Wolfgang Gönnenwein Süddeutscher Madrigalchor Consortium Musicum	Herrad Wehrung; Emmy Lisken; Johannes Hoefflin; Jakob Stämpfli	EMI	1963	
J. S. Bach: Das Kantatenwerk – Sacred Cantatas Vol. 2	Nikolaus Harnoncourt: Wiener Sängerknaben; Chorus Viennensis; Concentus Musicus Wien	boy soprano of the Wiener Sängerknaben; Paul Esswood; Kurt Equiluz; Max van Egmond	Teldec	1974	Period
Die Bach Kantate Vol. 6	Helmuth Rilling Gächinger Kantorei Württemberg Chamber Orchestra Heilbronn	Ulrike Sonntag; Elisabeth Graf; Aldo Baldin; Philippe Huttenlocher	Hänssler	1984	
J. S. Bach: Wir danken dir, Gott	Philippe Herreweghe Collegium Vocale Gent	Deborah York; Ingeborg Danz; Mark Padmore; Peter Kooy	Harmonia Mundi France	1999	Period
Bach Edition Vol. 21 – Cantatas Vol. 12	Pieter Jan Leusink Holland Boys Choir Netherlands Bach Collegium	Marjon Strijk; Sytse Buwalda; Knut Schoch; Bas Ramselaar	Brilliant Classics	2000	Period
J. S. Bach: Complete Cantatas Vol. 20	Ton Koopman Amsterdam Baroque Orchestra & Choir	Sandrine Piau; Bogna Bartosz; James Gilchrist; Klaus Mertens	Antoine Marchand	2002	Period
J. S. Bach: Cantatas	Nikolaus Harnoncourt Arnold Schoenberg Choir Concentus Musicus Wien	Christine Schäfer; Bernarda Fink; Werner Güra; Christian Gerhaher	Deutsche Harmonia Mundi	2007	Period
J.S. Bach: Cantatas Vol. 52 – Wachet auf, ruft uns die Stimme, Cantatas 29, 112, 140 (Cantatas from Leipzig 1730s–40s (I))	Masaaki Suzuki Bach Collegium Japan	Hana Blažíková; Robin Blaze; Gerd Türk; Peter Kooy	BIS	2011	Period

== Transcriptions ==
The Sinfonia has been transcribed for organ by Marcel Dupré, Noel Rawsthorne, and by Ian Tracey. Other transcriptions can be found at Partita for Violin No. 3 (Bach).

== Bibliography ==
Scores

- Wir danken dir, Gott, wir danken dir, BWV 29: Scores at the International Music Score Library Project
- "Wir danken dir, Gott, wir danken dir BWV 29; BC B 8 / Sacred cantata (Council election)". Bach Digital. 2015.

Books

- Dürr, Alfred (1971). Die Kantaten von Johann Sebastian Bach (in German). Vol. 1. Bärenreiter-Verlag. OCLC 523584.
- Jones, Richard D. P. (2013). The Creative Development of Johann Sebastian Bach, Volume II: 1717–1750: Music to Delight the Spirit. Oxford University Press. ISBN 978-0-19-969628-4.

Online sources

Several databases provide additional information on each cantata, such as history, scoring, sources for text and music, translations to various languages, discography, discussion and musical analysis.

The complete recordings of Bach's cantatas are accompanied by liner notes from musicians and musicologists: Klaus Hofmann wrote for Masaaki Suzuki, and Christoph Wolff for Ton Koopman.

- Ambrose, Z. Philip (2012). "BWV 29 Wir danken dir, Gott, wir danken dir". University of Vermont.
- Bischof, Walter F. (2012). "BWV 29 Wir danken dir, Gott, wir danken dir". University of Alberta.
- Browne, Francis; Oron, Aryeh (2008). "Nun lob, mein' Seel', den Herren / Text and Translation of Chorale". Bach Cantatas website.
- Dellal, Pamela (2012). "BWV 29 – "Wir danken dir, Gott, wir danken dir"". Emmanuel Music.
- Grob, Jochen (2015). "BWV 29 / BC B 8" (in German). s-line.de. Archived from the original on 2 April 2015.
- Hofmann, Klaus (2012). "Wir danken dir, Gott, wir danken dir / Unto thee, O God, do we give thanks, BWV 29" (PDF). Bach Cantatas website. pp. 7–8.
- Mincham, Julian (2010). "Chapter 85 Bwv 29 – The Cantatas of Johann Sebastian Bach". jsbachcantatas.com.
- Oron, Aryeh (2014). "Cantata BWV 29 Wir danken dir, Gott, wir danken dir". Bach Cantatas website.
- Wolff, Christoph (2003). "Wir danken dir, Gott, wir danken dir, BWV29" (PDF). Bach Cantatas website. p. 25.
