= Jauchzet Gott in allen Landen, BWV 51 =

Church cantata by Johann Sebastian Bach

Jauchzet Gott in allen Landen
- BWV 51
- Church solo cantata by J. S. Bach
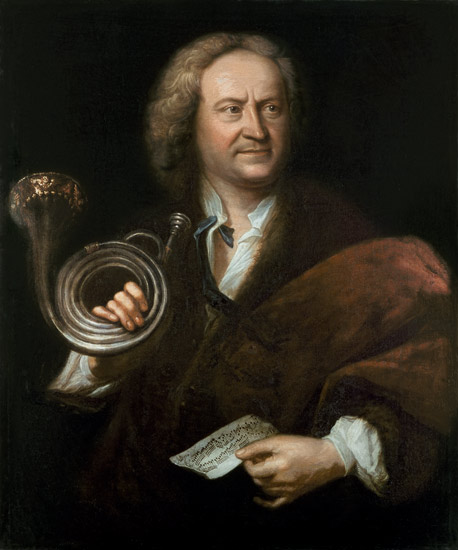
- Gottfried Reiche, for whom the solo trumpet part was probably written
- Occasion: 15th Sunday after Trinity
- Chorale: Nun lob, mein Seel, den Herren
- Performed: 17 September 1730: Leipzig
- Movements: five
- Vocal: soprano solo
- Instrumental: trumpet; 2 violins; viola; continuo

Johann Sebastian Bach composed the church cantata Jauchzet Gott in allen Landen ("Exult in God in every land" or "Shout for joy to God in all lands") BWV 51, in Leipzig. The work is Bach's only church cantata scored for a solo soprano and trumpet. He composed it for general use (ogni tempo), in other words not for a particular date in the church calendar, although he used it for the 15th Sunday after Trinity: the first known performance was on 17 September 1730 in Leipzig. The work may have been composed earlier, possibly for an occasion at the court of Christian, Duke of Saxe-Weissenfels, for whom Bach had composed the Hunting Cantata and the Shepherd Cantata.

The text was written by an unknown poet who took inspiration from various biblical books, especially from Psalms, and included as a closing chorale a stanza from the hymn "Nun lob, mein Seel, den Herren". Bach structured the work in five movements, with the solo voice accompanied by a Baroque instrumental ensemble of a virtuoso trumpet, strings and continuo. While the outer movements with the trumpet express extrovert jubilation of God's goodness and his wonders, the central introspective aria, accompanied only by the continuo, conveys a "profound expression of commitment to God". He set the closing chorale as a chorale fantasia, the soprano sings the unadorned melody to a trio of two violins and continuo, leading to an unusual festive fugal Alleluja, in which the trumpet joins.

The Bach scholar Klaus Hofmann notes that the work, unusually popular among Bach's church cantatas, is unique in the demanded virtuosity of the soprano and trumpet soloist, and evidences "overflowing jubilation and radiant beauty".

== History and words ==
Bach used the cantata in Leipzig for the 15th Sunday after Trinity on 17 September 1730. The prescribed readings for the Sunday came from the Epistle to the Galatians, Paul's admonition to "walk in the Spirit" (Galatians 5:25–6:10), and from the Sermon on the Mount in the Gospel of Matthew, which exhorts the faithful not to worry about material needs, but to seek God's kingdom first (Matthew 6:23–34). The author is unknown. Without any reference to the prescribed readings, he incorporates in the first movement ideas from Matthew 6:30, Psalms 138:2 and Psalms 26:8, and in the central aria thoughts from Matthew 6:34 and Lamentations 3:22–23. The closing chorale is the fifth stanza of "Nun lob, mein Seel, den Herren", added to Johann Gramann's hymn in Königsberg in 1549. Bach used the same stanza in a different setting to close his cantata Wir danken dir, Gott, wir danken dir, BWV 29. Bach led the performance on 17 September 1730.

Bach's manuscript indicates the 15th Sunday after Trinity "et in ogni tempo" ("and at any time"). The latter phrase indicates the possible general use of the work, with a cantata text that has no direct relevance to the scriptural readings. The dedication for the 15th Sunday was added later, indicating that the cantata was not intended for the specific occasion.

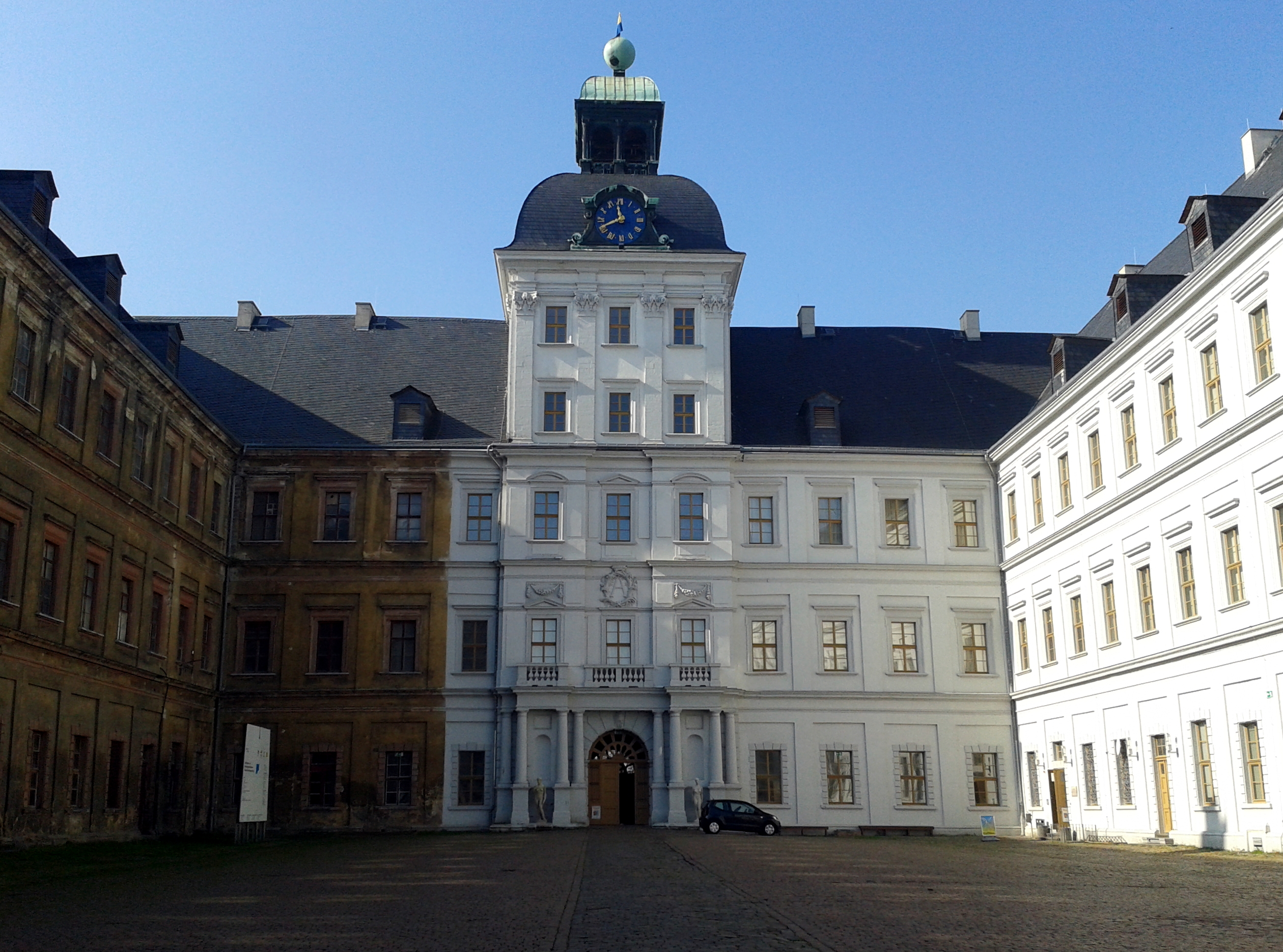
Schloss Neu-Augustusburg in Weißenfels

Bach composed BWV 51 during a period when he composed church cantatas only irregularly, some of them to complete his earlier cycles. According to the Bach scholar Christoph Wolff, Bach may have written the cantata shortly before 1730 for an unknown occasion. The performance material survived but does not reveal further detail, other than indicating one later performance. Hofmann sees a connection to the court of Weißenfels where a scoring for solo soprano and trumpet was popular, and assumes that the work may have been originally intended for a performance at court by a professional female singer. Bach had written two birthday cantatas for Christian, Duke of Saxe-Weissenfels. (Note: The Hunting Cantata, Was mir behagt, ist nur die muntre Jagd, BWV 208, in 1713, and the Shepherd Cantata, Entfliehet, verschwindet, entweichet, ihr Sorgen, BWV 249a, in 1725.) He was invited to the birthday celebration of 1729 and returned with the title of Hofkapellmeister of Sachsen-Weißenfels (court director of music of Saxe-Weissenfels), and Hofmann thinks a connection between the title and cantata "highly probable".

Both the soprano part, which covers two octaves and requires a high C, and the solo trumpet part, which at times trades melodic lines with the soprano on an equal basis, are extremely virtuosic. The Bach scholar Alfred Dürr assumes that Bach had an unusually gifted singer, adding that a female voice was unlikely in conservative Leipzig. According to Joshua Rifkin, Christoph Nichelmann is a possible candidate because Bach being aware of his capabilities accepted him willingly to the Thomasschule and Nichelmann matriculated into the school three weeks before the first performance. The trumpet part was probably written for Gottfried Reiche, Bach's principal trumpeter at the time. The scoring is unique in Bach's cantatas, but was frequently used by Italian composers such as Alessandro Scarlatti. Bach's son Friedemann Bach arranged the work by adding a second trumpet and timpani.

The cantata is one of only four sacred cantatas that Bach wrote for a solo soprano (if one excludes his arrangement of the cantata for solo bass and oboe Ich habe genug, BWV 82, for flute and soprano BWV 82a) and no other vocal soloists (the others being Falsche Welt, dir trau ich nicht, BWV 52, Ich bin vergnügt mit meinem Glücke, BWV 84, and Mein Herze schwimmt im Blut, BWV 199), while he wrote several secular cantatas for solo soprano: Weichet nur, betrübte Schatten, BWV 202, Ich bin in mir vergnügt, BWV 204, Non sa che sia dolore, BWV 209, and O holder Tag, erwünschte Zeit, BWV 210.

== Music ==
=== Structure and scoring ===
Bach structured the cantata in five movements and scored it for a soprano soloist and a Baroque instrumental ensemble of trumpet (Tr), two violins (Vl), viola (Va), and basso continuo (Bc). The title of the autograph score reads: "Dominica 15 post Trinitatis / et / In ogni Tempo. / Jauchzet Gott in allen Landen. / à / Soprano solo / 1 Tromba* / 2 Violino / Viola / e / Continuo / di / Joh:Seb:Bach". It is the only church cantata by Bach scored for solo soprano and trumpet. The duration is given as 20 minutes.

In the following table of the movements, the scoring follows the Neue Bach-Ausgabe. The keys and time signatures are taken from Dürr, using the symbol for common time (4/4). The instruments are shown separately for wind instrument and strings. The continuo, playing throughout, is not shown.

Movements of Jauchzet Gott in allen Landen
No.	Title	Type	Vocal	Winds	Strings	Key	Time
1	Jauchzet Gott in allen Landen	Aria	Soprano	Tr	2Vl Va	C major	common time
2	Wir beten zu dem Tempel an	Recitative	Soprano		2Vl Va	A minor	common time
3	Höchster, mache deine Güte	Aria	Soprano			A minor	12/8
4	Sei Lob und Preis mit Ehren	Chorale	Soprano		2Vl	C major	3/4
5	Alleluja	[Finale]	Soprano	Tr	2Vl Va	C major	2/4

=== Movements ===
The music is concertante and virtuoso for both the trumpet and the soloist. The first aria and the concluding Alleluja are in the style of an Italian concerto. Dürr observes that the five movements are in five different musical forms: concerto, monody, variation, chorale fantasia and fugue. The scoring is richest in the outer movements (with the trumpet), and reduced to just continuo in the central aria.

==== 1 ====
The first aria, "Jauchzet Gott in allen Landen" (Exult in God in every land), is in da capo form, with extended coloraturas. The theme, with a beginning in a triad fanfare, is well suited to the trumpet. It is first developed in a ritornello of the orchestra and then "constantly worked" in the soprano part.

==== 2 ====
The only recitative, "Wir beten zu dem Tempel an" (We pray at Thy temple), is first accompanied by the strings, a second part is secco but arioso. The second part develops the idea of "von seinen Wundern lallen" (chatter about His wonders) in coloraturas of rhythmical complexity.

==== 3 ====
The second aria, "Höchster, mache deine Güte" (Highest, renew Thy goodness), is accompanied only by the continuo "quasi ostinato" which supports expressive coloraturas of the voice. The lines in the continuo, in constant movement in 12/8 time seem to constantly rise, towards the addressed "Höchster" (Highest) which appears as an octave jump down. Two extended melismas express gratefulness for being a child of God. The musicologist Julian Minchem notes that Bach is able to convey with modest means a "profound expression of commitment to God".

==== 4 ====
The chorale, "Sei Lob und Preis mit Ehren" (Glory, and praise with honor), is a chorale fantasia, with the soprano singing the unadorned melody to a three-part accompaniment of two violins and continuo.

==== 5 ====
The chorale leads without a break to a concluding fugal "Alleluja" with the trumpet, bringing the cantata to a particularly festive close. The movement begins with the soprano and the responding trumpet, before the other instruments come in to build a "fine display piece". Mincham summarizes: "The long flowing melismas leave one literally breathless with the sheer pleasure in, and energy generated through, the relationship with God."

== Recordings ==
The selection is taken from the listing provided by Bach Cantatas Website.

The cantata was recorded by sopranos such as Elisabeth Schwarzkopf (from 1948), Maria Stader (1959), Elly Ameling (1970), Edith Mathis (1972), Edita Gruberova (1979), Lucia Popp (1980), Helen Donath (1983), Elizabeth Parcells (1983), Monika Frimmer (1984), Barbara Hendricks (1989), Christine Schäfer (1999), Siri Thornhill (2007), and Natalie Dessay (2009).

In the following table, the second soloist is the trumpeter. Ensembles playing on period instruments in historically informed performance are marked by a green background under the header Instr..

Recordings of Jauchzet Gott in allen Landen, BWV 51
Title	Conductor / Choir / Orchestra	Soloists	Label	Year	Instr.
J. S. Bach: Johann Sebastian Bach Solo-Kantaten	Gustav Leonhardt Concerto Amsterdam	Agnes Giebel; Maurice André	Telefunken	1963	
Bach: Kantate BWV 51 – Kantate BWV 202	Kurt Masur Gewandhausorchester	Adele Stolte; Armin Mönnel	Eterna	1971	
Les Grandes Cantates de J. S. Bach Vol. 25	Fritz Werner Württembergisches Kammerorchester Heilbronn	Emiko Iiyama; Maurice André	Erato	1972	Chamber
J. S. Bach: Das Kantatenwerk Vol. 14	Gustav Leonhardt Leonhardt-Consort	Marjanne Kweksilber; Don Smithers	Teldec	1974	Period
J.S. Bach: Magnificat-Jauchzet Gott in allen Landen	John Eliot Gardiner English Baroque Soloists	Emma Kirkby; Crispian Steele-Perkins	Philips	1983	Period
J. S. Bach: Complete Cantatas Vol. 19	Ton Koopman Amsterdam Baroque Orchestra	Marlis Petersen; Gabriele Cassone	Antoine Marchand	2001	Period
J.S. Bach: Cantatas Vol. 30 – BWV 51, 210, 1127 (Solo Cantatas)	Masaaki Suzuki Bach Collegium Japan	Carolyn Sampson; Toshio Shimada	BIS	2005	Period
Baroque Duet	John Nelson Orchestra of St. Luke's	Kathleen Battle; Wynton Marsalis	Sony Music	1992	

== Sources ==
- Jauchzet Gott in allen Landen, BWV 51: Scores at the International Music Score Library Project
- Jauchzet Gott in allen Landen BWV 51; BC A 134 / Sacred cantata (15th Sunday after Trinity) Bach Digital
- BWV 51 Jauchzet Gott in allen Landen English translation, University of Vermont
