= Ihr Menschen, rühmet Gottes Liebe, BWV 167 =

Church cantata by Johann Sebastian Bach

Ihr Menschen, rühmet Gottes Liebe
- BWV 167
- Church cantata by J. S. Bach
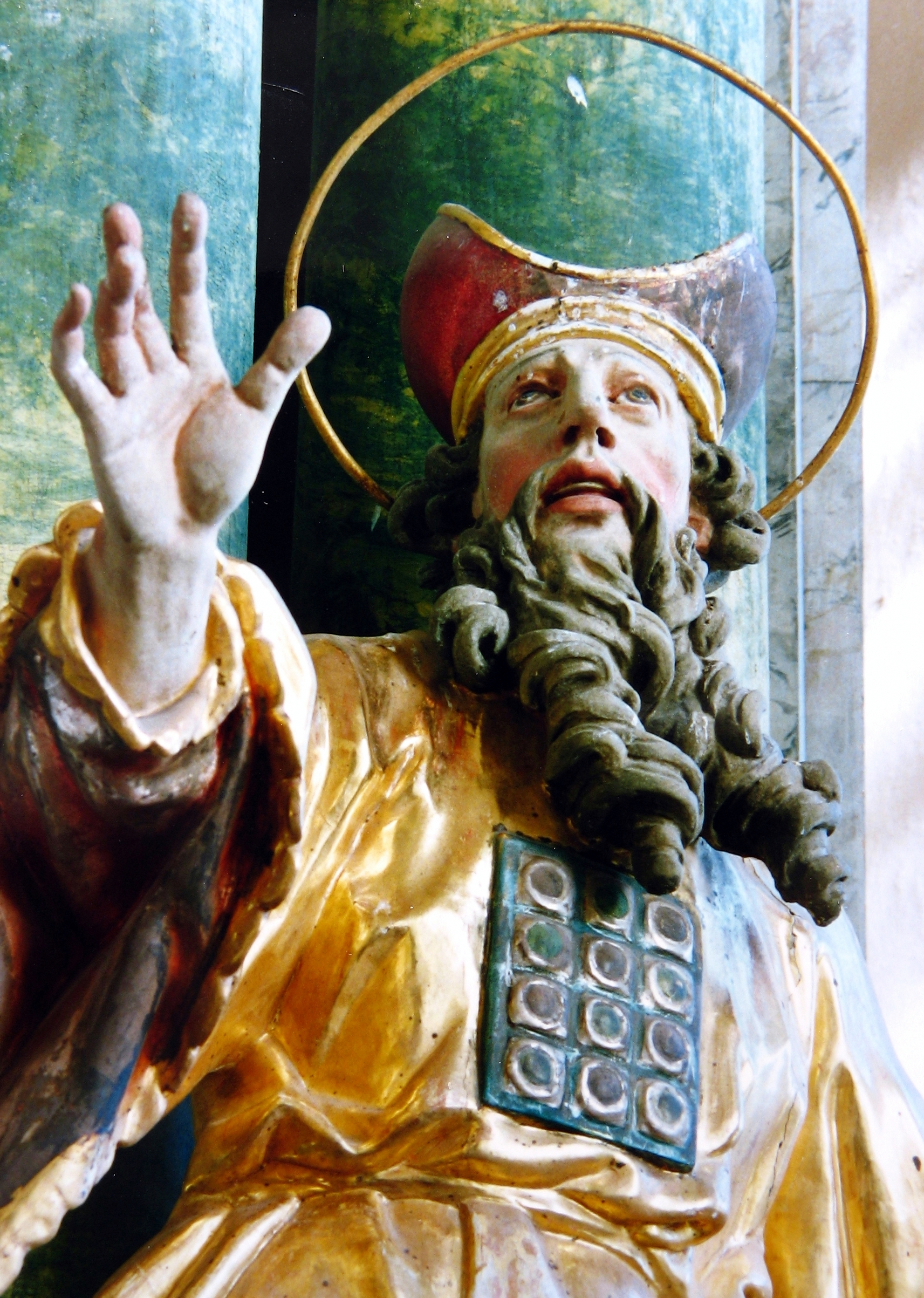
- Zechariah (topic of the cantata), by Anton Sturm, 18th century
- Occasion: Feast of St. John the Baptist
- Chorale: "Nun lob, mein Seel, den Herren"
- Performed: 24 June 1723: Leipzig
- Movements: 5
- Vocal: SATB solo and choir
- Instrumental: clarino; oboe da caccia; oboe; 2 violins; viola; continuo

Johann Sebastian Bach composed the church cantata Ihr Menschen, rühmet Gottes Liebe (You people, glorify God's love), BWV 167 in Leipzig for the Feast of St. John the Baptist (German: Fest Johannes des Täufers, also Johannistag) and first performed it on 24 June 1723. It is part of his first cantata cycle in Leipzig.

== History and words ==
Bach composed Ihr Menschen, rühmet Gottes Liebe in his first year in Leipzig for St. John's Day, soon after he had taken up his position as Thomaskantor. He had delivered an ambitious cantata in 14 movements, Die Elenden sollen essen, BWV 75, in the first service as cantor on 30 May 1723. In comparison, his first cantata for a saint's feast day in five movements is small scale.

The prescribed readings for the Sunday were from the Book of Isaiah, "the voice of a preacher in the desert" (Isaiah 40:1–5), and from the Gospel of Luke, the birth of John the Baptist and the Benedictus of Zechariah (Luke 1:57–80). The unknown poet took some phrases from the Gospel, such as the beginning of movement 2, "Gelobet sei der Herr Gott Israel" (Praise be to the Lord God of Israel), as in the canticle. The poetry follows the thought that Jesus, born of a woman (des Weibes Samen), is predicted to redeem sins, which are represented by the image of the serpent. The poetry concludes with the request to sing praises like Zechariah, fulfilled in the closing chorale, the fifth stanza of Johann Gramann's "Nun lob, mein Seel, den Herren" (1549).

== Scoring and structure ==
The cantata in five movements is scored like chamber music for four vocal soloists (soprano, alto, tenor and bass), a four-part choir only in the closing chorale, clarino, oboe da caccia, oboe, two violins, viola, and basso continuo. The clarino only doubles the melody of the chorale.

1. Aria (tenor): Ihr Menschen, rühmet Gottes Liebe
2. Recitative (alto): Gelobet sei der Herr Gott Israel
3. Duet aria (soprano, alto): Gottes Wort, das trüget nicht
4. Recitative (bass): Des Weibes Samen kam
5. Chorale: Sei Lob und Preis mit Ehren

== Music ==
Different from his first cantatas performed in Leipzig, Bach begins the cantata not with a chorus, but with an aria. Possibly Bach looked at the canticle of Zechariah as an individual's song of praise. The aria is accompanied only by the strings, sometimes a solo violin, sometimes a dense texture of all strings. The following recitative, referring to St. John and Jesus in the course of redemption, ends in an arioso on the lines mit Gnad und Liebe zu erfreun und sie zum Himmelreich in wahrer Buß zu leiten (to delight with grace and love, and to lead to the kingdom of Heaven in true remorse). This arioso is accompanied by an ostinato movement in the continuo in "a semiquaver, quasi-Alberti figuration". The following duet, accompanied by an obbligato oboe da caccia (the first recorded use of the instrument), achieves a dense texture because the voices and the oboe operate in the same range, often in homophony. The middle section of the da capo structure is again in two different parts. The first part leaves the "three beats in a measure" of the opening section for "common time", four beats. A canon of the voices is accompanied by its beginning motif played both in the oboe and the continuo. The second part returns to the 3/4 but again in new material, endless jubilating runs and repetitions, expressing the joy that "we have, praise God, experienced".

The following recitative ends again in an arioso, when it comes to the request to sing praises like Zechariah. At this point the melody of the following chorale is already present in the bass voice on the words "und stimmet ihm ein Loblied an" (and voice unto him a song of praise). The closing chorale is a general song of praise. Bach did not simply set the melody for four parts, as usual. Instead, he finally used all instruments and voices together. The oboe doubles the violin, a clarino (slide trumpet) comes in for its only appearance, doubling the soprano, the choir is embedded in a concerto of the orchestra. This chorale fantasia setting anticipates the closing chorales of Bach's Christmas Oratorio and Ascension Oratorio, composed more than a decade later.

== Recordings ==
The listing is taken from the selection on the Bach Cantatas Website.

- Die Bach Kantate Vol. 41, Helmuth Rilling, Figuralchor der Gedächtniskirche Stuttgart, Bach-Collegium Stuttgart, Kathrin Graf, Helrun Gardow, Adalbert Kraus, Niklaus Tüller, Hänssler 1974
- J. S. Bach: Das Kantatenwerk – Sacred Cantatas Vol. 9, Nikolaus Harnoncourt, Tölzer Knabenchor, Concentus Musicus Wien, Helmut Wittek and Panito Iconomou (soloists of the Tölzer Knabenchor), Kurt Equiluz, Robert Holl, Teldec 1987
- J. S. Bach: Complete Cantatas Vol. 8, Ton Koopman, Amsterdam Baroque Orchestra & Choir, Dorothea Röschmann, Bogna Bartosz, Jörg Dürmüller, Klaus Mertens, Antoine Marchand 1998
- J. S. Bach: Cantatas Vol. 9 (Cantatas from Leipzig 1725), Masaaki Suzuki, Bach Collegium Japan, Midori Suzuki, Robin Blaze, Gerd Türk, Chiyuki Urano, BIS 1998
- Bach Cantatas Vol. 1: City of London / For the Feast of St. John the Baptist, John Eliot Gardiner, Monteverdi Choir, English Baroque Soloists, Joanne Lunn, Wilke te Brummelstroete, Paul Agnew, Dietrich Henschel, Soli Deo Gloria 2000
- Bach Cantates De Saint-Jean Baptiste / Intégrale des cantates sacrées Vol. 1, Eric Milnes, Montréal Baroque, Suzie LeBlanc, Daniel Taylor, Charles Daniels, Stephan MacLeod, ATMA 2004

== Sources ==
- Ihr Menschen, rühmet Gottes Liebe, BWV 167: Scores at the International Music Score Library Project
- Ihr Menschen, rühmet Gottes Liebe BWV 167; BC A 176 / Sacred cantata (Birth of John the Baptist (24 June)) Bach Digital
- BWV 167 Ihr Menschen, rühmet Gottes Liebe English translation, University of Vermont
- BWV 167 Ihr Menschen, rühmet Gottes Liebe text, scoring, University of Alberta
- Cantata BWV 167 Margaret Greentree, 3 March 2011
- BWV 167.5 bach-chorales.com
