= Helmut Bornefeld =

German church musician (1906–1990)

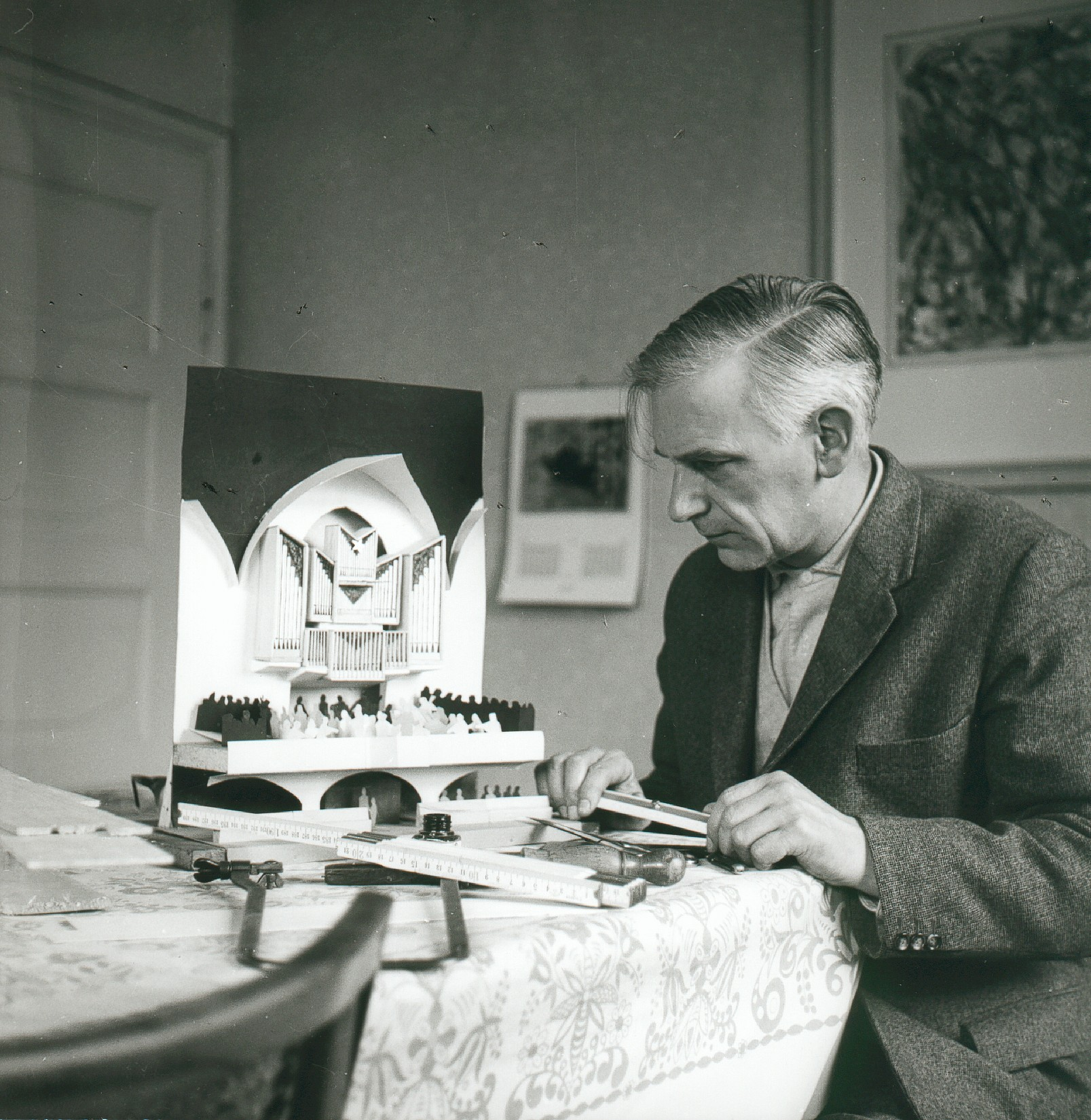
Helmut Bornefeld 1962

Helmut Bornefeld (14 December 1906 – 11 February 1990) was a German Protestant church musician, composer, church organ expert and writer.

== Career ==
Born in Untertürkheim, Bornefeld began his vocational training in 1922 with an apprenticeship as gardener, which he completed with the skilled worker examination. From 1924 to 1928 he studied music at the Adler Conservatory in Stuttgart. In 1928 he moved to the Musikhochschule (today Staatliche Hochschule für Musik und Darstellende Kunst Stuttgart), where he studied composition with Ewald Straesser, piano and organ with Hermann Keller. From 1935 to 1937 he completed his education by studying church music, which he completed with the A-exam. From 1937 to 1971 he worked, with the exception of a six-year interruption of the war from 1939 to 1945, as cantor and organist at the Evangelische Pauluskirche (Heidenheim). In 1951 he was appointed Kirchenmusikdirektor there. From 1950 to 1958 he taught as lecturer for composition and Kantoreipraxis at the Evangelische Hochschule für Kirchenmusik Tübingen.

Together with Siegfried Reda, Bornefeld organized the Heidenheimer Arbeitstage für Neue Kirchenmusik from 1946 to 1960. Under his influence, numerous organs worthy of protection were – partly irrevocably – changed in character according to his ideas. By sawing off pipes, among other things, he endeavoured to brighten the sound of mainly Romantic or late Romantic organs and to reshape the dispositions according to his aesthetic ideals.

Bornefeld has written numerous texts and essays on questions of church music and organ building.

Bornefeld died in Heidenheim an der Brenz on 11 February 1990 aged 85.

== Awards ==
Bornefeld was awarded the Bundesverdienstkreuz for his achievements in 1972. On 5 June 1976, State Minister Hans Filbinger awarded him the honorary professorship of the state of Baden-Württemberg. On 4 December 1981, he received the Citizen Medal of the City of Heidenheim. In 1993, the name of the local Kirchenstraße was changed in Helmut-Bornefeld-Straße.

== Organ cases and dispositions (selection) ==
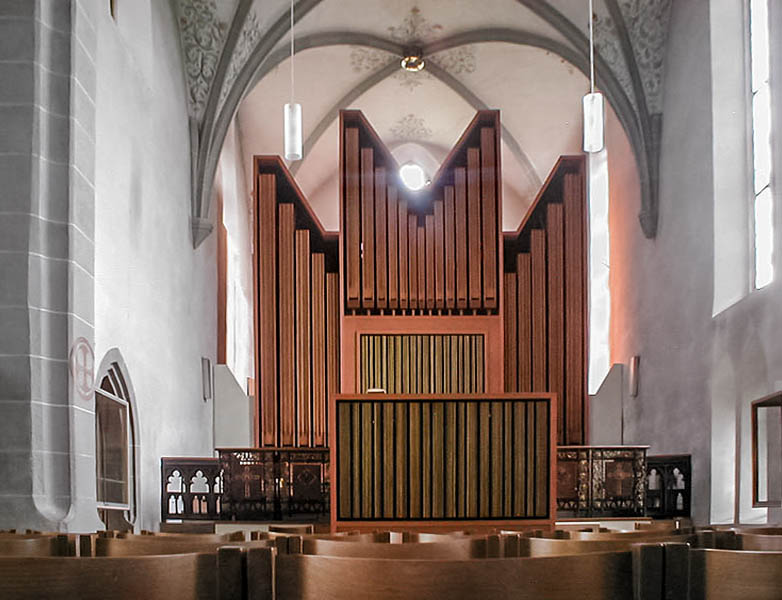
Orgel der Stadtkirche Murrhardt

As an organ keeper, Bornefeld designed numerous instruments with an eye to outer appearance, casing and mensuration. His musical aesthetic concerns are still evident today in many instruments, of which a selection of thirty have been listed in the area of the Protestant Church in Württemberg:

- Evangelische Michaelskirche in Heidenheim an der Brenz.
- Evangelische Stadtkirche Murrhardt
- Evangelische Stadtkirche in Schorndorf
- Evangelische Kirche in Schrozberg, built by Gebrüder Link, Giengen
- Chororgel (1960) in Ulm Minster
- Evangelische Kirche in Wachbach by Bad Mergentheim
- Evangelische Versöhnungskirche in Wiblingen by Ulm
- Versöhnungskirche (Oberkochen), built by Gebrüder Link, Giengen

== Works (selection) ==
=== Organ, choir and chamber music ===
- 1930–1960: Choralwork with numerous choir and accompanying movements, organ choral movements, choral preludes, motets, cantatas, partitas and sonatas
- Arrangements of secular folk songs
- Spiritual and secular canons
- Music for solo singing or/and solo instruments with organ
- Works for organ solo
- Chamber music
- Numerous arrangements of the works of other composers from different eras for different instrumentations

=== Hymns ===
The Evangelisches Gesangbuch contains canons by Bornefeld:

- EG 173 "Der Herr behüte deinen Ausgang und Eingang" (1947) (core section)
- EG 633 "Trachtet nach dem, was droben ist" (1947) (regional section Bavaria)
- EG 683 "Jesus Christus gestern und heute" (1947) (regional section Württemberg)
