= Hans Kugelmann =

Hans Kugelmann (died July–August 1542) was a German court trumpeter, and composer of Concentus novi trium vocum, a collection of choral pieces.

== Life ==
Kugelmann's year and place of birth are not known. From 1519 to 1523 he was in Innsbruck, a member of the court orchestra of Maximilian I, Holy Roman Emperor. He was later a musician for the Fugger family in Augsburg. He became in 1524 court composer and the chief court trumpeter for Albert, Duke of Prussia, in Königsberg (now Kaliningrad). In 1534 he became the court Kapellmeister, after the dismissal of the previous holder of the office, Adrian Rauch, who had been denounced by Kugelmann. He remained as Kapellmeister until his death in July or August 1542.

== Concentus novi trium vocum ==
He published in 1540 Concentus novi trium vocum, a collection of choral pieces in German and Latin, financed by Albert, Duke of Prussia. The first section has 24 movements, contrapuntal settings of church music for three high voices, beginning and ending with a Latin mass. The second section has four settings of psalms; these include "Nun lob, mein Seel, den Herren" ("Now praise, my soul, the Lord", Psalm 103) for two four-part choirs.
