= Herrad Wehrung =

German soprano

Herrad Rosemarie Hornung-Wehrung (19 August 1925 – 11 December 2010) was a German soprano and an academic voice teacher.

== Career ==
Wehrung was born in Münster, Westphalia, the daughter of the Protestant theologian Georg Wehrung. She studied voice at the Mozarteum in Salzburg with Günther Baum, in Stuttgart and at the Hochschule für Musik Freiburg with Margarethe von Winterfeldt. She was active from 1950 and 1975 as a concert singer, appearing in Europe. She collaborated with the composers Helmut Bornefeld and Siegfried Reda. She then taught voice at the Musikhochschule Stuttgart and the Hochschule für Musik Trossingen.

She lived in Tübingen, where her father had worked since 1931. She co-founded the Tübinger Kammermusikkreis (Tübingen chamber music circle) in 1944. She died in Tübingen.
