= Nun lob, mein Seel, den Herren =

Lutheran hymn by Johann Gramann

- Lutheran hymn
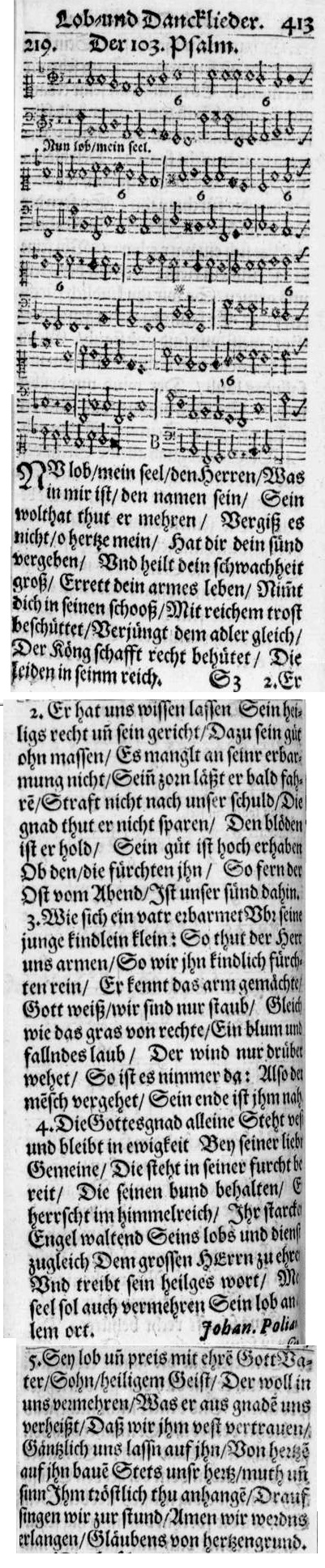
- "Nun lob, mein Seel, den Herren", Johann Crüger: Praxis pietatis melica, 1653
- English: "My Soul, now Praise thy Maker"
- Catalogue: Zahn 8244
- Text: by Johann Gramann
- Language: German
- Melody: by Hans Kugelmann
- Published: 1540

"Nun lob, mein Seel, den Herren" (Now praise, my soul, the Lord) is a Lutheran hymn written in German by the theologian and reformer Johann Gramann in 1525. It was published in 1540 and appears in 47 hymnals. A translation by Catherine Winkworth, "My Soul, now Praise thy Maker!", was published in 1863.

== History and text ==
The hymn is a general song of praise, paraphrasing Psalm 103 in four stanzas of 12 lines each. It is supposed to have been written in 1525 "at the request of the Margrave Albrecht, as a version of his favourite Psalm". The hymn was published in Nürnberg as a broadsheet around 1540, and in Augsburg in the hymnal Concentus novi by Hans Kugelmann in 1540, with a hymn tune, Zahn No. 8244, derived from the secular song "Weiß mir ein Blümlein blaue". A fifth stanza was added in a reprint in Nürnberg in 1555, "Sey Lob und Preis mit Ehren". The hymn appears in 47 hymnals.

== Music ==
The text has been set by several composers. Christoph Graupner wrote a cantata, Johann Hermann Schein composed a motet, Michael Praetorius a motet for eight voices. Heinrich Schütz set the hymn as part of Book I of his Psalmen Davids in 1619 (SWV 41). and Johann Pachelbel used the melody in a chorale prelude in about 1693.

Johann Sebastian Bach used the hymn in several church cantatas. He composed four-part settings to close cantatas Ihr Menschen, rühmet Gottes Liebe, BWV 167 (1723), Wer Dank opfert, der preiset mich, BWV 17 (1726), Jauchzet Gott in allen Landen, BWV 51 (1730) and Wir danken dir, Gott, wir danken dir, BWV 29 (1731). He set the hymn as a complex motet as movement 2 of his cantata for the Sunday after Christmas, Gottlob! nun geht das Jahr zu Ende, BWV 28, reflecting thanks for a year coming to a close. Bach also used the third stanza of the hymn for the second of three movements of the motet Singet dem Herrn ein neues Lied, BWV 225. Bach's four-part chorale settings are BWV 389 and 390.

Dieterich Buxtehude composed a chorale fantasia, BuxWV 212, in C major, and three organ preludes, BuxWV 213–215. An organ prelude was also written by Johann Pachelbel.

== English ==
It was translated in several languages, including "My Soul, now Praise thy Maker!" by Catherine Winkworth, published in her Chorale Book for England in 1863. J. C. Jacobi translated it in 1722 as "My soul! exalt the Lord thy God", H. Mills as "Now to the Lord sing praises", published in 1845.
