= Marjanne Kweksilber =

Dutch soprano

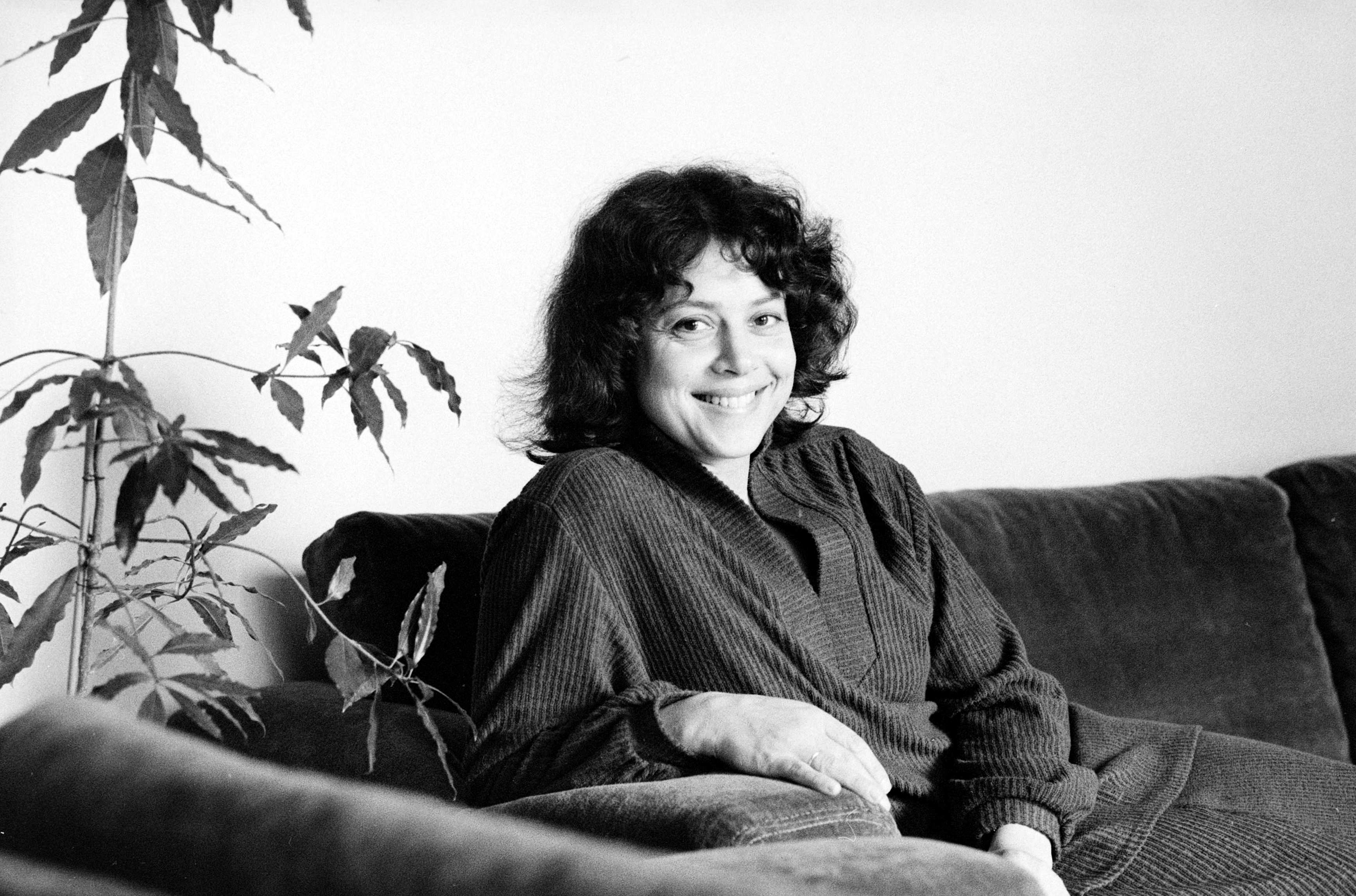
Marjanne Kweksilber, 1977

Marjanne Kweksilber (18 January 1944 – 12 May 2008) was a Dutch soprano, who became famous as an interpreter of Neue Musik as well as baroque and renaissance music.

== Life and career ==
Born in Amsterdam, Kweksilber grew up in Amsterdam and went to Israel for a year in 1962 to work on a kibbutz. There she collected 350 Jewish songs, which she performed after her return with the Collegium Musicum Iudaïcum in the Netherlands, but also in Germany and Belgium. In 1965, the album Songs of Israel, which was made together with Stephen Simon, was released; the interpretation of Donna Donna contained in it climbed to the top of the charts in the Netherlands. From 1967 to 1972, Kweksilber studied solo singing at the Conservatorium van Amsterdam with Herman Schey; she received further instruction from Max van Egmond, Bodi Rapp, Marilyn Tyler and Cathy Berberian.

From 1972, she worked as a soprano. Her interpretation of Erik Satie's cantata Socrate (with the ASKO Ensemble conducted by Reinbert de Leeuw) received outstanding reviews, followed by recordings of further songs by Satie and the Brechtlieder by Kurt Weill and Hanns Eisler. In 1976, she was one of the female voices in Louis Andriessen's De Staat and in the same year had a leading role in Jiri Benda's production of Ariadne auf Naxos for the Holland Festival. She sang Pamina in Mozart's The Magic Flute, but also contemporary operas such as Axel by Reinbert de Leeuw and Jan van Vlijmen or the Bijmer Opera by Jacques Bank. Furthermore, she interpreted songs by Arnold Schönberg and Ferruccio Busoni as well as madrigals by Claudio Monteverdi. With her second husband, the pianist Ludwig Olshansky, she performed a Schubert programme in the Netherlands and the United States. From her first marriage comes her son David Kweksilber, with whom she performed the premiere of Rita Knuistingh Neven's Vier Lieder von Streit und Ablösung written for her in 2001.

In the last years of her life she concentrated on vocal pedagogy and workshops. She also conducted Kurt Schwitter's Ursonate, An Anna Blume and Stefan Themerson's Wuff Wuff.

Kweksilber died in Amsterdam at the age of 64.

== Recordings ==
- Mirjam & Stephen Songs of Israel (Decca 1965)
- Mélodies, Hymne, Poèmes D'Amour, Ludions by Eric Satie (Harlekijn 1976, with Reinbert de Leeuw)
- Italienische Solokantaten by Georg Friedrich Händel (Das Alte Werk 1978, with Ton Koopman)
- Vier Lieder by Alban Berg (VARA 1980)
- Jauchzet Gott in allen Landen, BWV 51 by Johann Sebastian Bach (Telefunken/Teldec), conducted by Gustav Leonhardt
- Orfeo ed Euridice by Gluck (Accent 1982), conducted by Sigiswald Kuijken
- Music from the Spanish Civil War (BV Haast 1991) Ebony Band under Werner Herbers's conduct.
- Modern Times: Dutch Jewish Composers 1928-1943 (Channel Classics 1995)
