= Gisbert Schneider =

German organ player and academic (1934–2018)

Gisbert Schneider (14 January 1934 – 1 December 2018) was a German professor for artistic organ playing and improvisation at the Folkwang Hochschule Essen as well as Kirchenmusikdirektor.

== Life ==
Born in Wattenscheid, Schneider grew up in Weimar. There he received his first organ lessons from Johannes Ernst Köhler. He completed his church music and Kapellmeister studies with Siegfried Reda at the Folkwang Hochschule Essen. This was followed by a position as a church musician in Velbert and Mülheim an der Ruhr. Since 1961 he was also a lecturer at Folkwang Hochschule Essen, 1970 he was appointed professor.

Schneider was the prize winner of international organ competitions and in 1958 he received the Förderpreis des Landes Nordrhein-Westfalen für junge Künstlerinnen und Künstler. In addition to his international concert activities, he was a jury member of international organ competitions. There were particularly close scientific cooperations with the Academy of Music in Kraków and Jan Jargoń. There exist radio and vinyl recordings of Schneider as well as CDs/SACD recordings. He was the founder and for more than 50 years the director of the Kantorei Velbert. In 1996 he was awarded the Bundesverdienstkreuz.

Scneider died in Velbert aged 84.

== Discography ==
- Wilhelm Middelschulte (1863–1943): Orgelwerke, Gisbert Schneider an der Großen Alexander Schuke Orgel im Dom zu Erfurt, Audio-CD 1997, Cybele Records
- Johann Sebastian Bach: Orgelwerke auf der großen Silbermann-Orgel im Dom zu Freiberg, Gisbert Schneider, Mehrkanal SACD abspielbar auch auf herkömmlichen CD-Playern, 2003, Cybele Records
