= Gottlob! nun geht das Jahr zu Ende, BWV 28 =

Cantata by Johann Sebastian Bach

Gottlob! nun geht das Jahr zu Ende
- BWV 28
- Church cantata by J. S. Bach
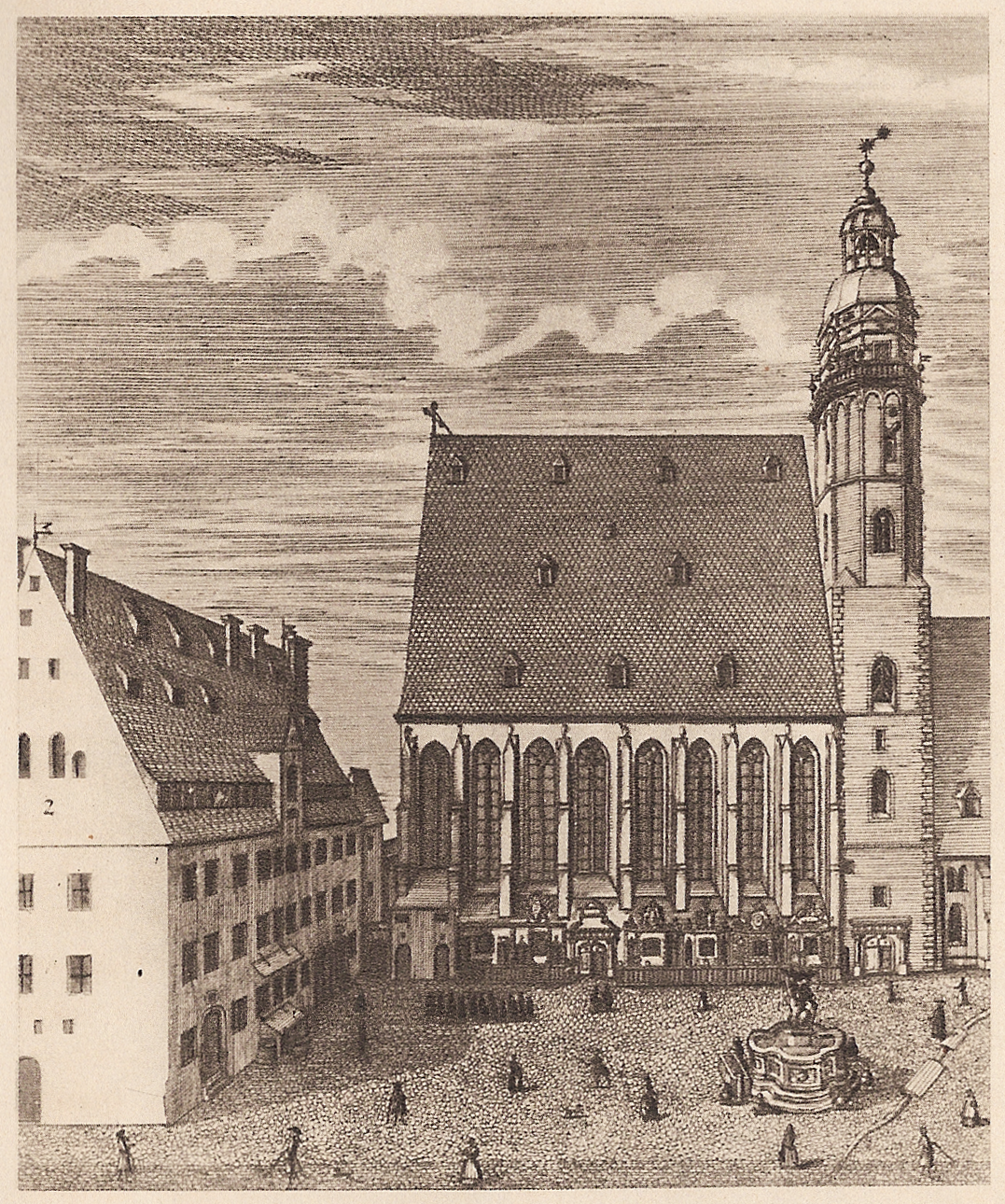
- Thomaskirche, Leipzig, 1723
- Occasion: 1st Sunday after Christmas
- Performed: 30 December 1725: Leipzig

Gottlob! nun geht das Jahr zu Ende (Praise God! Now the year comes to an end), BWV 28, (Note: "BWV" is Bach-Werke-Verzeichnis, a thematic catalogue of Bach's works.) is a church cantata by Johann Sebastian Bach for the Sunday after Christmas. He first performed it on 30 December 1725. Bach wrote the cantata in the third year of his tenure as Thomaskantor, director of church music in Leipzig. The text by Erdmann Neumeister ignores the prescribed reading for the Sunday and is focused on the turn of the year instead, including stanzas from two hymns, Johann Gramann's "Nun lob, mein Seel, den Herren" and from Paul Eber's "Helft mir Gotts Güte preisen.

Bach structured the cantata in six movements and scored it for four vocal soloists, a four-part choir, and a Baroque instrumental ensemble of cornetto, three trombones, two oboes, taille, strings and continuo.

== History and text ==
Bach composed the cantata in his third year as Thomaskantor in Leipzig for the Sunday after Christmas. The prescribed readings for the Sunday were from the Epistle to the Galatians, through Christ we are free from the law (Galatians 4:1–7), and from the Gospel of Luke, Simeon and Anna talking to Mary (Luke 2:33–40).

The cantata text is by Erdmann Neumeister: he included in the second movement the first stanza of Johann Gramann's hymn "Nun lob, mein Seel, den Herren" (1530), a Bible quotation (Jeremiah 32:41) in the third movement, and a hymn stanza by Paul Eber for the closing chorale. The chorale theme "Helft mir Gotts Güte preisen" (Zahn 5267) is of unknown authorship. The poet did not refer to the Bible readings for the day but portrayed thanks for the past year and prayers for preservation in the new year.

Bach led the first performance of the cantata in the church service on 30 December 1725.

== Music ==
=== Structure and scoring ===
Bach structured the cantata in six movements, scored for four vocal soloists (soprano, alto, tenor, bass) and four-part choir, and a Baroque instrumental ensemble of cornetto, three trombones, two oboes, taille, two violins, viola and continuo.

Movements of Gottlob! nun geht das Jahr zu Ende
No.	Title	Type	Vocal	Winds	Strings	Others / Brass	Key	Time
1	Gottlob! nun geht das Jahr zu Ende	Aria	Soprano	2 oboes, taille	2 violins, 1 viola	continuo	A minor	3/4
2	Nun lob, mein Seel, den Herren	Chorale	SATB	1 oboe (col soprano), 1 oboe (coll'alto), cornetto (col soprano), taille (col tenore)	1 violin (col soprano), 1 violin (coll'alto), viola (col tenore)	1 trombone (coll'alto), 1 trombone (col tenore), 1 trombone (col basso) continuo	C major	cut time
3	So spricht der Herr	Recitative / arioso	Bass			continuo		common time
4	Gott ist ein Quell	Recitative	Tenor		2 violins, viola	continuo		common time
5	Gott hat uns im heurigen Jahre gesegnet	Duet	Alto / Tenor			continuo	C major	6/8
6	All solch dein Güt wir preisen	Chorale	SATB	1 oboe (col soprano), 1 oboe (coll'alto), cornetto (col soprano), taille (col tenore)	1 violin (col soprano), 1 violin (coll'alto), viola (col tenore)	1 trombone (coll'alto), 1 trombone (col tenore), 1 trombone (col basso) continuo	A minor	common time

=== Movements ===
The cantata opens with an oboe trio playing an Italianate ritornello of four phrases, accompanied by the strings; the roles of the two choirs are later reversed. The soprano sings a virtuosic and melismatic aria commanding the listener to praise God.

That imperative is taken up by the full ensemble in the following movement, a chorale adopting the 'archaic' motet form in the stile antico. It is reminiscent of the movements which opened most of Bach's chorale cantatas, composed as a cycle the previous year. The cantus firmus is sung in long notes by the soprano while the lower voices add "skilful imitatory texture, partly from new themes and partly from ideas derived from the chorale line in question", as Klaus Hofmann notes. The strings and oboes, joined by a quartet of cornetto and trombones, play colla parte in motet style doubling the four voices. BWV 28 was performed at the end of John Eliot Gardiner's Bach Cantata Pilgrimage in 2000, and liner notes describe this movement's "sobriety and complexity, its buried treasures and subtleties, especially those that occur in its last fifty bars, in which you sense some immense cosmic struggle being played out".

The third movement, a bass arioso, repeats the ascending scalar motif of the chorus.

The tenor recitative is accompanied by sustained chordal strings and concludes on a major harmony.

The continuo opens the duet aria with a two-part ritornello – dancing eighth notes followed by fast arpeggiated figures – that is repeated three more times during this movement. The vocal lines sing three blocks of imitative motivic entries. In the style of Italian chamber duets, the voices first render a thought in imitation, "coming together each time for a concluding cadence".

The cantata concludes with a four-part chorale in A minor. Gardiner, who had conducted several versions during the Pilgrimage, notes the moving power of this harmonisation of the "prayer for protection and sustenance in the year to come".

== Recordings ==
- Amsterdam Baroque Orchestra & Choir, Ton Koopman. J. S. Bach: Complete Cantatas Vol. 15. Antoine Marchand 2001.
- Bach Collegium Japan, Masaaki Suzuki. J. S. Bach: Cantatas Vol. 28 – Cantatas from Leipzig 1724. BIS 2007.
- Gächinger Kantorei, Bach-Collegium Stuttgart, Helmuth Rilling. Die Bach Kantate Vol. 59. Hänssler 1982.
- Heinrich-Schütz-Chor Heilbronn, Pforzheim Chamber Orchestra, Fritz Werner. Les Grandes Cantates de J.S. Bach Vol. 10. Erato 1965.
- Holland Boys Choir, Netherlands Bach Collegium, Pieter Jan Leusink. Bach Edition Vol. 11 – Cantatas Vol. 5. Brilliant Classics 2000.
- Monteverdi Choir, English Baroque Soloists, John Eliot Gardiner. Bach Cantatas Vol. 19: Greenwich/Romsey. Soli Deo Gloria 2000.
- Münchener Bach-Chor, Münchener Bach-Orchester, Karl Richter. J. S. Bach: Kantatan/Cantatas BWV 80, BWV 26, BWV 116. Archiv Produktion 1972.
- Wiener Sängerknaben, Chorus Viennensis, Concentus Musicus Wien, Nikolaus Harnoncourt. J. S. Bach: Das Kantatenwerk – Sacred Cantatas Vol. 2. Teldec 1974.
