= Lobe den Herrn, meine Seele =

- Christian hymn
- English: Praise the Lord, my soul
- Language: German
- Based on: Psalm 103
- Melody: by Norbert Kissel
- Composed: 1991

"Lobe den Herrn, meine Seele" (Praise the Lord, my soul) is a new Christian hymn in German with text, based on Psalm 103, and music by Norbert Kissel. The song of the genre Neues Geistliches Lied is part of several hymnals and song collections.

== History and text ==
Norbert Kissel wrote text and music of "Lobe den Herrn, meine Seele" i 1991. The text "Lobe den Herrn, meine Seele" is based on Psalm 103; the refrain recalls first verse 2, then verse 1, and the four stanzas take ideas from further verses. The melody was composed by Norbert Kissel in 1991. He wrote the refrain as a round in two parts. It appeared in several hymnals and songbooks, including regional sections of the Protestant hymnal Evangelisches Gesangbuch, such as EG 92 in the northern region. A 2020 collection for women features six alternate stanzas by Katharina Wegner with the refrain.
