= Partita for Violin No. 3 (Bach) =

Composition for violin by Johan Sebastian Bach

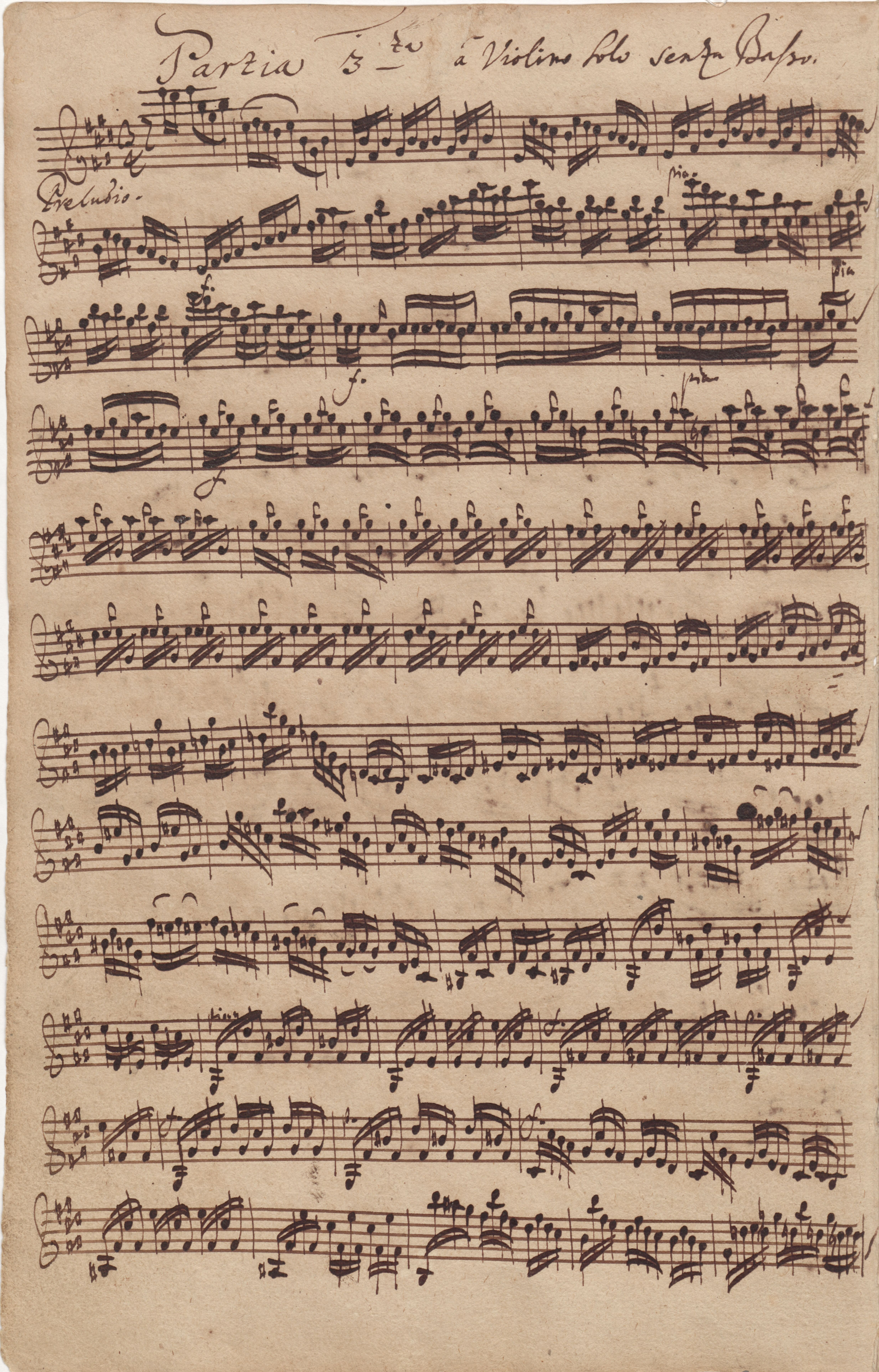
First page of opening preludio

The preludio, played by Yehudi Menuhin

The Partita No. 3 in E major for solo violin, BWV 1006.1 (formerly 1006), is the last work in Johann Sebastian Bach's set of Sonatas and Partitas. It consists of the following movements:

1. Preludio
2. Loure
3. Gavotte en Rondeau
4. Menuets (I and II)
5. Bourrée
6. Gigue

It takes about 15–18 minutes to perform.

Bach transcribed the Partita as a suite, cataloged as BWV 1006.2 (formerly 1006a). The music critic Wilhelm Tappert claimed in 1900 that this arrangement was for lute solo, but present research indicates that it was for an unspecified instrument.

The Preludio consists almost entirely of semiquavers (i.e. sixteenth notes). The Preludio was also transcribed by Bach for use in two cantatas:

- the sinfonia which opens the second part of the 1729 cantata Herr Gott, Beherrscher aller Dinge, BWV 120a.
- the opening sinfonia, scored for obbligato organ, oboes, trumpets and strings, of the 1731 cantata Wir danken dir, Gott, wir danken dir, BWV 29, in D major

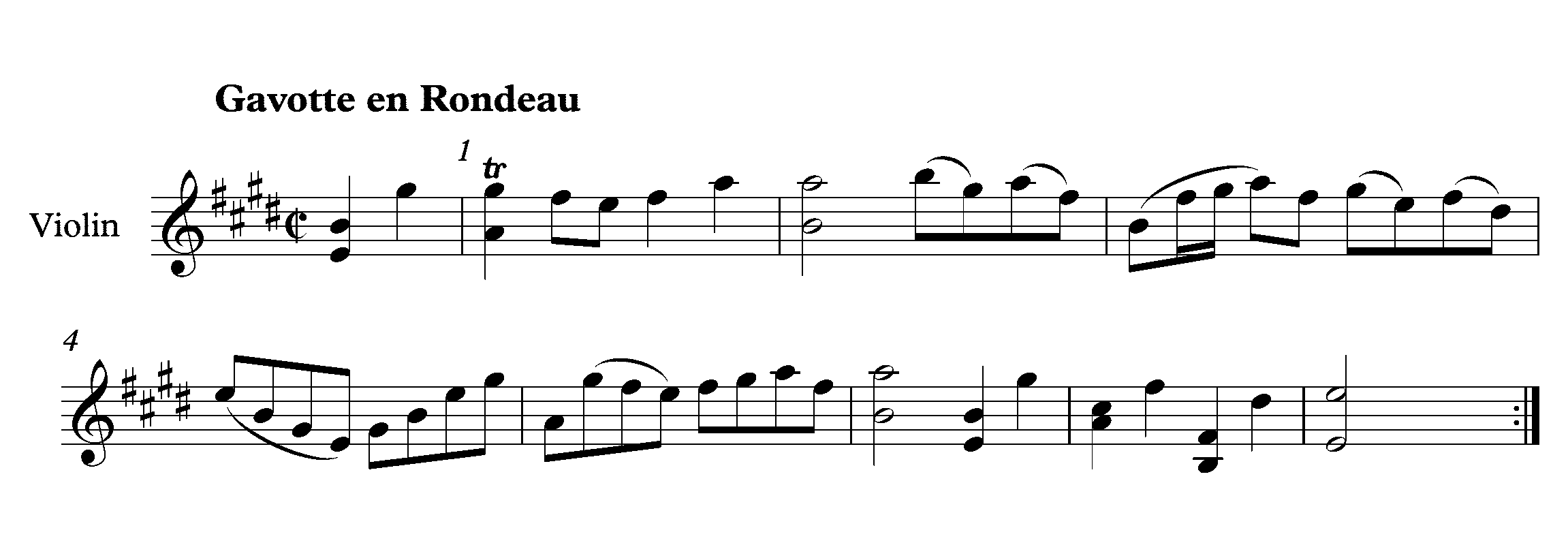

The "Gavotte en Rondeau" is included on the Voyager Golden Record and often heard in TV or radio programs.

In 1933 Sergei Rachmaninoff transcribed for piano (and subsequently recorded) the Preludio, Gavotte, and Giga from this partita (as TN iii/1). An arrangement of the Preludio for jazz trio by Jacques Loussier appeared on his Reflections of Bach album of 1987 and was used as the theme of the BBC Radio 4 music quiz show Counterpoint. Eugéne Ysaÿe's Violin Sonata No. 2 in A Minor also quotes the Preludio in the first movement.

Preludio
Performed on guitar (originally composed for lute) by Gordon Rowland.

Gavotte en Rondeau
Amateur performance

Menuet I
Amateur performance
