= Annette Seiltgen =

German opera singer

Annette Seiltgen (born 26 June 1964 in Wuppertal) is a German operatic mezzo-soprano/dramatic soprano.

== Career ==
Seiltgen grew up in an artistic environment. Her father, Ernst Seiltgen, was intendant and long-time director of the Stadttheater Ingolstadt, her mother is the opera, concert and oratorio singer Emmy Lisken. During her school days in Ingolstadt, where she attended the Reuchlin-Gymnasium, she played in the statistery (?) of the theater and sang in several choirs. Seiltgen studied singing with her mother at the Leopold Mozart Centre in Augsburg. She received her first engagement as a mezzo-soprano at the Staatstheater Kassel. Subsequently, she moved to the Staatstheater am Gärtnerplatz in Munich. From 1996 to 2011 she was a member of the Deutsche Oper am Rhein ensemble. There she sang all the great roles of the lyrical and dramatic mezzo repertoire among others: Ruggiero (Alcina), Sesto (La clemenza di Tito), Venus (Tannhäuser), Octavian (Der Rosenkavalier), the composer (Ariadne auf Naxos), Adalgisa (Norma), Fricka (Die Walküre) as well as Brangäne (Tristan und Isolde).

Seiltgen has made guest appearances in Berlin (Komische Oper Berlin), Darmstadt, Dortmund, Essen, Frankfurt, Hanover, Koblenz, Leipzig, Mannheim, Mainz, Munich (Bayerische Staatsoper), Nuremberg, Passau and Stuttgart, as well as on the music stages of Amsterdam, Buenos Aires (Teatro Colón), Geneva, Madrid, Maastricht, Nice, Savonlinna, Santiago de Chile and Strasbourg. She is currently a member of the ensemble of the Landestheater Niederbayern.

In addition to her stage presence, the artist is also active as a concert singer. Her concerts have been recorded by the ZDF, the Hessischer Rundfunk, the Bayerischer Rundfunk and the Omroepvereniging VARA.
