= Wachbach =

River in Germany

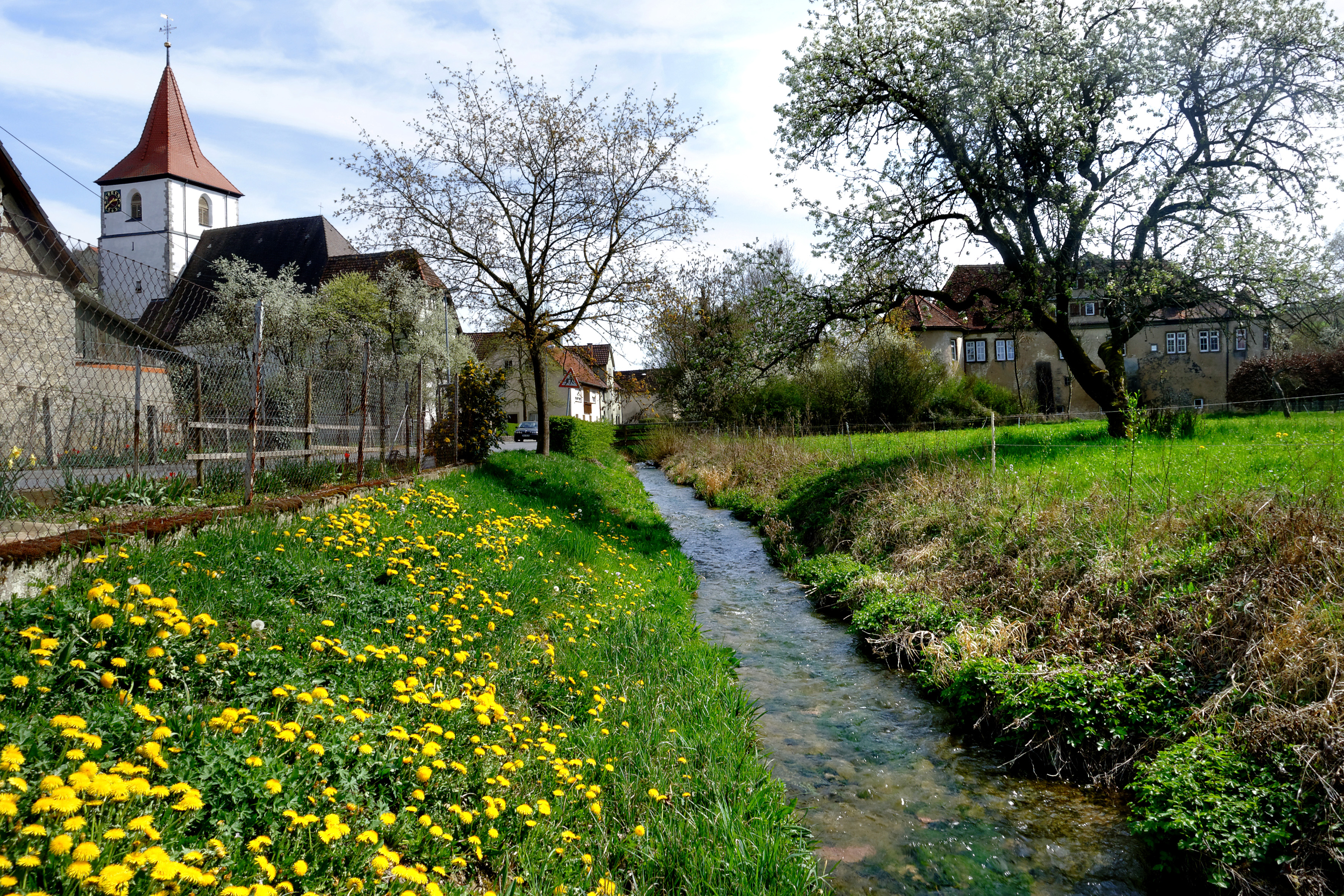

Location
- Country: Germany
- State: Baden-Württemberg

Physical characteristics
- Mouth
  - location: Tauber
  - coordinates: 49.4972°N 9.7713°E
- Length: 12.6 km (7.8 mi)

Basin features
- Progression: Tauber→ Main→ Rhine→ North Sea

Wachbach is a river of Baden-Württemberg, Germany. It flows into the Tauber in Bad Mergentheim.

== See also ==
- List of rivers of Baden-Württemberg
