= Psalm 103 =

Biblical psalm

- "Bless the LORD, O my soul"
- Hymn psalm
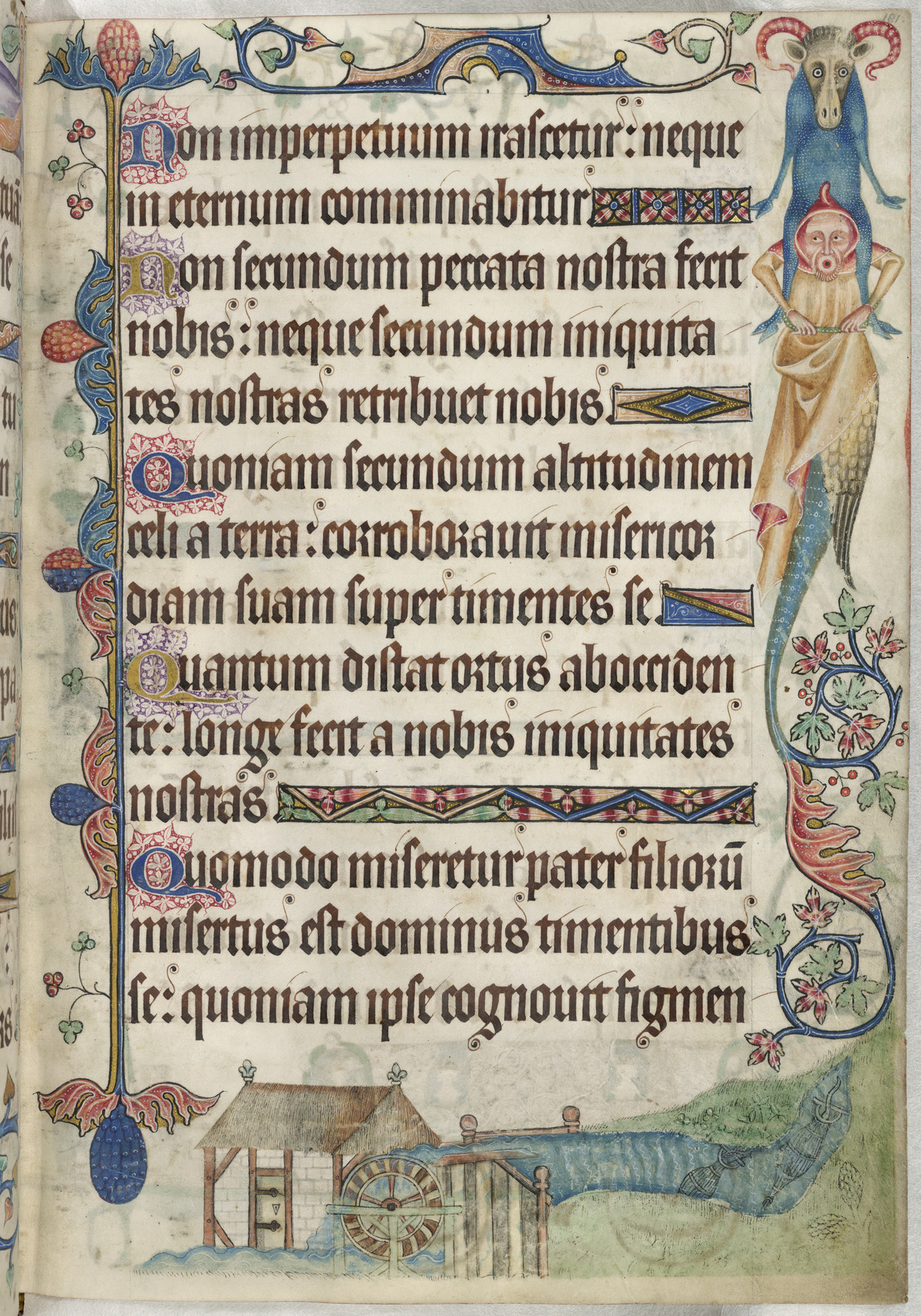
- Psalm 103 in Luttrell Psalter c. 1325–1335
- Other name: Psalm 102 (Vulgate); "Benedic anima mea Domino"
- Language: Hebrew (original)

Psalm 103
- ← Psalm 102 Psalm 104 →
- Book: Book of Psalms
- Hebrew Bible part: Ketuvim
- Order in the Hebrew part: 1
- Category: Sifrei Emet
- Christian Bible part: Old Testament
- Order in the Christian part: 19

Psalm 103 is the 103rd psalm of the Book of Psalms, beginning in English in the King James Version: "Bless the LORD, O my soul". The Book of Psalms is part of the third section of the Hebrew Bible, and a book of the Christian Old Testament. In Latin, it is known as "Benedic anima mea Domino". The psalm is a hymn psalm.

In the slightly different numbering system used in the Greek Septuagint and Latin Vulgate translations of the Bible, this psalm is Psalm 102.

The first verse (the sub-heading in most English translations) attributes the psalm to King David. The psalm forms a regular part of Jewish, Catholic, Lutheran, Anglican and other Protestant liturgies. The psalm has been paraphrased in hymns, and has often been set to music.

== Background and themes ==
Baptist preacher and biblical commentator Charles Spurgeon suggests that the psalm was written in David's later life, as seen by the psalmist's focus on the frailty of life and his "higher sense of the preciousness of pardon, because a keener sense of sin". Spurgeon divides the psalm into three sections:

- Verses 1–5: The Psalmist's personal experience of God's compassion;
- Verses 6–19: The attributes of God as seen in his interactions with his people;
- Verses 20–22: The Psalmist's call to all creatures to join him in blessing God.

Lutheran minister Ernst Wilhelm Hengstenberg notes that the number of verses in the psalm parallels the 22 letters of the Hebrew alphabet, and that the concluding words repeat the opening words, "finishing" and "rounding off" the psalm into a complete whole. Nonconformist minister Matthew Henry also notes this circular form, stating: "Blessing God and giving him glory must be the alpha and the omega of all our services".

The Midrash Tehillim offers several explanations of the first verse, among them:

Rabbi Levi said in the name of Rabbi Hama: A sculptor makes a statue; the sculptor dies, but his sculpture endures. It is not thus with the Holy One, blessed be He. The Holy One made man, and man dies, but the Holy One lives and endures. … Another comment: A sculptor makes a statue, but cannot make a soul or vital organs. But the Holy One made a statue, man, and within him made a soul and vital organs. Therefore, David offered praise, "Bless the LORD, O my soul; and all that is within me, bless His holy name".

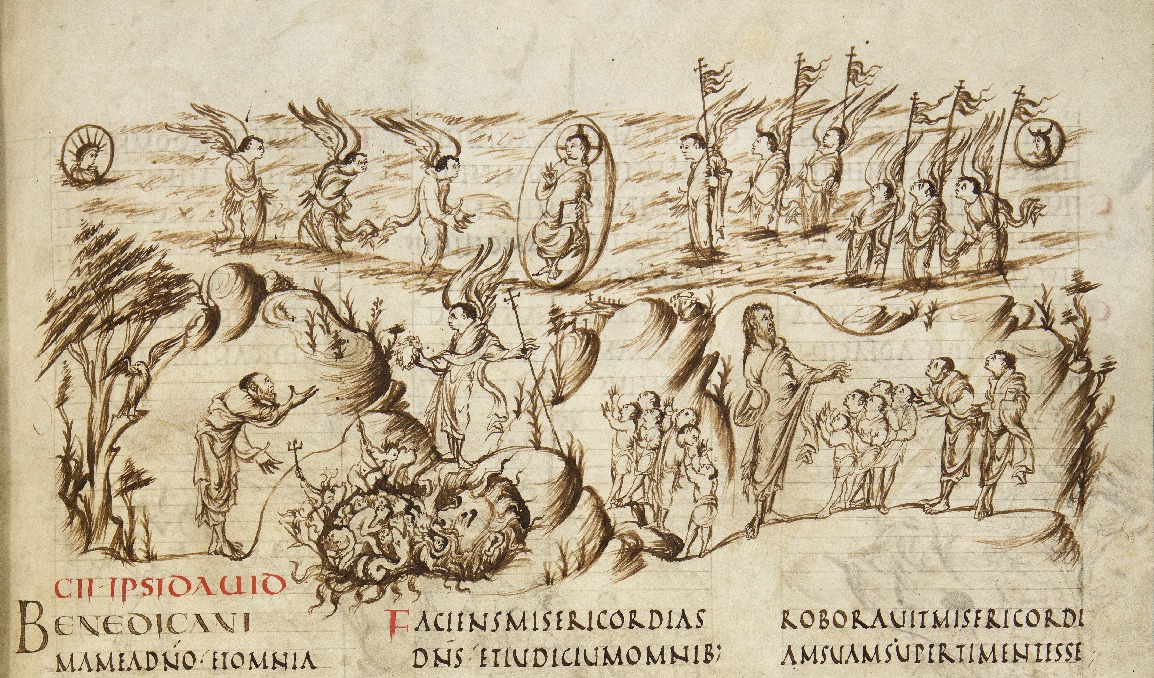
Psalm 103 from the Utrecht Psalter

The opening words, "Bless the LORD, O my soul", appear again at the beginning of Psalm 104, reinforcing the thematic connection between these psalms. But Patrick D. Miller also sees Psalm 103 as a logical extension of Psalm 102, pointing out that "one may see [Psalm] 102 as opening issues and questions to which [Psalm] 103 offers the solution or answer". For example, in Psalm 102 the psalmist blames his illness and pain on God's "indignation and anger" (verse 10), while Psalm 103 makes it clear that divine anger is not the final word, nor will it last forever.

=== Textual witnesses ===
Some early manuscripts containing the text of this chapter in Hebrew are of the Masoretic Text tradition, which includes the Aleppo Codex (10th century), and Codex Leningradensis (1008).

The extant palimpsest Aq^{Taylor} includes a translation into Koine Greek by Aquila of Sinope in c. 130 CE, containing verses 1–13.

== Uses ==
=== New Testament ===
Verse 17 is quoted in Mary's song of praise, the Magnificat, in Luke 1:50.

=== Judaism ===
Verse 1 is the final verse of Nishmat.

Verses 2, 10, and 13 are recited during Selichot.

Verses 10, 13, and 14 are part of the Tachanun prayer. Verse 14 is also recited during a burial service.

Verse 17 is recited during the blessings before the Shema on the second day of Rosh Hashanah.

Verse 19 is part of the Yehi kevod prayer recited during Pesukei Dezimra.

=== Catholic Church ===
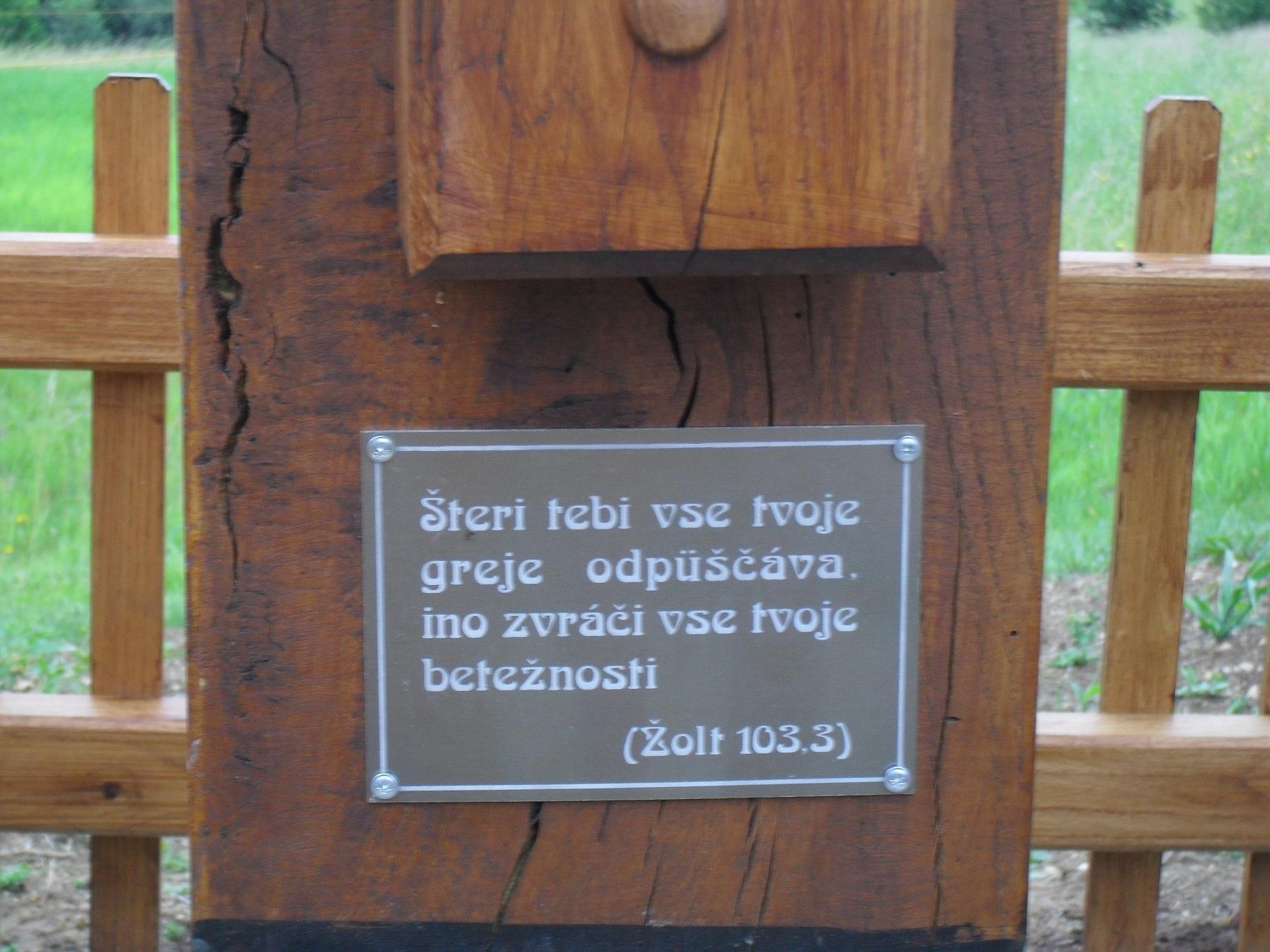
Verse 3 of the psalm on a cross in the village of Kétvölgy, Hungary

In the Western church, this psalm was traditionally performed during the celebration of Matins of Saturday by the order of St. Benedict, probably since its founding to 530.

In the Liturgy of the Hours, Psalm 103 is sung or recited during the Office of Sunday readings, second week. It is also used for Mass readings: it is the psalm read at the Mass of the Sacred Heart in Year A of the three-yearly cycle. In ordinary time, we find the 7th and the 24th Sunday of the year A and the eighth Sunday of the year B. In Lent, it is played the 3rd and 7th Sunday. Finally, it is the 7th Psalm on Easter Sunday.

=== Eastern Orthodox Church ===
In the Eastern Orthodox Church this psalm is one of the six psalms of Orthros (Matins) read every morning outside of Bright Week. It is also the first of the "Typical Psalms" of the Typica, which is read in place of the Divine Liturgy when the latter is not celebrated on days it is permitted to be. It is frequently sung as the first antiphon of the Divine Liturgy, but there it is often replaced by another antiphon on great feasts and on many weekdays, and is always thus replaced in Greek practice (except on Mount Athos).

=== Protestant ===
R. J. Thesman finds in this psalm a declaration that God never betrays us, never abandons us, and never forgets ..... His mercy covers our mistakes and our human tendencies, while Thomas Coke, calls it an exquisite performance, very applicable to every deliverance: it may properly be said to describe the wonders of grace. This Psalm is one continued hymn of praise, and includes a comprehensive view of the goodness of Jehovah, in all the great works of creation and redemption, while Albert Barnes called it exceedingly regular in its structure and composition; beautiful in its language and conceptions; adapted to all times and ages; suited to express the feelings of gratitude to God for deliverance from trouble, and for the manifestation of his mercy; suited to elevate the soul, and to fill it with cheerful views.

The Old Testament scholar Bernhard Duhm considers the Psalm a "compilation of all sorts of beautiful sentences from a fairly extensive reading".

=== Musical settings ===
==== Hymns ====
Psalm 103 is the basis of several hymns. A paraphrase of Psalm 103 in German is "Nun lob, mein Seel, den Herren", written by Johann Gramann in 1525, which was translated by Catherine Winkworth as "My Soul, now Praise thy Maker!" and published in 1863. English hymns include "Praise, my soul, the King of Heaven", written in the nineteenth century by Henry Francis Lyte, as well as "Sing to the Lord and praise him"; and “Like as a Father” by Florence Margaret Spencer Palmer. In 1991, "Lobe den Herrn, meine Seele" as written as a hymn with a refrain round of verses 2 and 1.

==== Compositions ====
In the 16th century, Claudin de Sermisy set the Psalm 102. Heinrich Schütz set the hymn "Nun lob, mein Seel, den Herren", SWV 201, for the Becker Psalter, published first in 1628. Henry Dumont set the psalm in Latin for La Chapelle Royale au Louvre in 1666.

In contemporary music, the song "Bless the Lord" in the musical Godspell is based on this psalm. "10,000 Reasons (Bless the Lord)" by Matt Redman and Jonas Myrin takes lyrics from this psalm, as does "The Lord is Gracious and Compassionate" by Vineyard Worship.

== Text ==
The following table shows the Hebrew text of the Psalm with vowels, alongside the Koine Greek text in the Septuagint and the English translation from the King James Version. Note that the meaning can slightly differ between these versions, as the Septuagint and the Masoretic Text come from different textual traditions. (Note: A 1917 translation directly from Hebrew to English by the Jewish Publication Society can be found here or here, and an 1844 translation directly from the Septuagint by L. C. L. Brenton can be found here. Both translations are in the public domain.) In the Septuagint, this psalm is numbered Psalm 102.

#	Hebrew	English	Greek
1	לְדָוִ֨ד ׀ בָּרְכִ֣י נַ֭פְשִׁי אֶת־יְהֹוָ֑ה וְכׇל־קְ֝רָבַ֗י אֶת־שֵׁ֥ם קׇדְשֽׁוֹ׃	(A Psalm of David.) Bless the LORD, O my soul: and all that is within me, bless his holy name.	Τῷ Δαυΐδ. - ΕΥΛΟΓΕΙ, ἡ ψυχή μου, τὸν Κύριον καί, πάντα τὰ ἐντός μου, τὸ ὄνομα τὸ ἅγιον αὐτοῦ·
2	בָּרְכִ֣י נַ֭פְשִׁי אֶת־יְהֹוָ֑ה וְאַל־תִּ֝שְׁכְּחִ֗י כׇּל־גְּמוּלָֽיו׃	Bless the LORD, O my soul, and forget not all his benefits:	εὐλόγει, ἡ ψυχή μου, τὸν Κύριον καὶ μὴ ἐπιλανθάνου πάσας τὰς ἀνταποδόσεις αὐτοῦ·
3	הַסֹּלֵ֥חַ לְכׇל־עֲוֺנֵ֑כִי הָ֝רֹפֵ֗א לְכׇל־תַּחֲלוּאָֽיְכִי׃	Who forgiveth all thine iniquities; who healeth all thy diseases;	τὸν εὐιλατεύοντα πάσας τὰς ἀνομίας σου, τὸν ἰώμενον πάσας τὰς νόσους σου·
4	הַגּוֹאֵ֣ל מִשַּׁ֣חַת חַיָּ֑יְכִי הַֽ֝מְעַטְּרֵ֗כִי חֶ֣סֶד וְרַחֲמִֽים׃	Who redeemeth thy life from destruction; who crowneth thee with lovingkindness and tender mercies;	τὸν λυτρούμενον ἐκ φθορᾶς τὴν ζωήν σου, τὸν στεφανοῦντά σε ἐν ἐλέει καὶ οἰκτιρμοῖς·
5	הַמַּשְׂבִּ֣יעַ בַּטּ֣וֹב עֶדְיֵ֑ךְ תִּתְחַדֵּ֖שׁ כַּנֶּ֣שֶׁר (Note: Although many translations have interpreted נשר as 'eagle', it more accurately refers to the griffon vulture.) נְעוּרָֽיְכִי׃	Who satisfieth thy mouth with good things; so that thy youth is renewed like the eagle's.	τὸν ἐμπιπλῶντα ἐν ἀγαθοῖς τὴν ἐπιθυμίαν σου, ἀνακαινισθήσεται ὡς ἀετοῦ ἡ νεότης σου.
6	עֹשֵׂ֣ה צְדָק֣וֹת יְהֹוָ֑ה וּ֝מִשְׁפָּטִ֗ים לְכׇל־עֲשׁוּקִֽים׃	The LORD executeth righteousness and judgment for all that are oppressed.	ποιῶν ἐλεημοσύνας ὁ Κύριος καὶ κρῖμα πᾶσι τοῖς ἀδικουμένοις.
7	יוֹדִ֣יעַ דְּרָכָ֣יו לְמֹשֶׁ֑ה לִבְנֵ֥י יִ֝שְׂרָאֵ֗ל עֲלִילוֹתָֽיו׃	He made known his ways unto Moses, his acts unto the children of Israel.	ἐγνώρισε τὰς ὁδοὺς αὐτοῦ τῷ Μωυσῇ, τοῖς υἱοῖς ᾿Ισραὴλ τὰ θελήματα αὐτοῦ.
8	רַח֣וּם וְחַנּ֣וּן יְהֹוָ֑ה אֶ֖רֶךְ אַפַּ֣יִם וְרַב־חָֽסֶד׃	The LORD is merciful and gracious, slow to anger, and plenteous in mercy.	οἰκτίρμων καὶ ἐλεήμων ὁ Κύριος, μακρόθυμος καὶ πολυέλεος·
9	לֹא־לָנֶ֥צַח יָרִ֑יב וְלֹ֖א לְעוֹלָ֣ם יִטּֽוֹר׃	He will not always chide: neither will he keep his anger for ever.	οὐκ εἰς τέλος ὀργισθήσεται, οὐδὲ εἰς τὸν αἰῶνα μηνιεῖ·
10	לֹ֣א כַ֭חֲטָאֵינוּ עָ֣שָׂה לָ֑נוּ וְלֹ֥א כַ֝עֲוֺנֹתֵ֗ינוּ גָּמַ֥ל עָלֵֽינוּ׃	He hath not dealt with us after our sins; nor rewarded us according to our iniquities.	οὐ κατὰ τὰς ἀνομίας ἡμῶν ἐποίησεν ἡμῖν, οὐδὲ κατὰ τὰς ἁμαρτίας ἡμῶν ἀνταπέδωκεν ἡμῖν,
11	כִּ֤י כִגְבֹ֣הַּ שָׁ֭מַיִם עַל־הָאָ֑רֶץ גָּבַ֥ר חַ֝סְדּ֗וֹ עַל־יְרֵאָֽיו׃	For as the heaven is high above the earth, so great is his mercy toward them that fear him.	ὅτι κατὰ τὸ ὕψος τοῦ οὐρανοῦ ἀπὸ τῆς γῆς ἐκραταίωσε Κύριος τὸ ἔλεος αὐτοῦ ἐπὶ τοὺς φοβουμένους αὐτόν·
12	כִּרְחֹ֣ק מִ֭זְרָח מִֽמַּעֲרָ֑ב הִֽרְחִ֥יק מִ֝מֶּ֗נּוּ אֶת־פְּשָׁעֵֽינוּ׃	As far as the east is from the west, so far hath he removed our transgressions from us.	καθόσον ἀπέχουσιν ἀνατολαὶ ἀπὸ δυσμῶν, ἐμάκρυνεν ἀφ᾿ ἡμῶν τὰς ἀνομίας ἡμῶν.
13	כְּרַחֵ֣ם אָ֭ב עַל־בָּנִ֑ים רִחַ֥ם יְ֝הֹוָ֗ה עַל־יְרֵאָֽיו׃	Like as a father pitieth his children, so the LORD pitieth them that fear him.	καθὼς οἰκτείρει πατὴρ υἱούς, ᾠκτείρησε Κύριος τοὺς φοβουμένους αὐτόν,
14	כִּי־ה֭וּא יָדַ֣ע יִצְרֵ֑נוּ זָ֝כ֗וּר כִּי־עָפָ֥ר אֲנָֽחְנוּ׃	For he knoweth our frame; he remembereth that we are dust.	ὅτι αὐτὸς ἔγνω τὸ πλάσμα ἡμῶν, ἐμνήσθη ὅτι χοῦς ἐσμεν.
15	אֱ֭נוֹשׁ כֶּחָצִ֣יר יָמָ֑יו כְּצִ֥יץ הַ֝שָּׂדֶ֗ה כֵּ֣ן יָצִֽיץ׃	As for man, his days are as grass: as a flower of the field, so he flourisheth.	ἄνθρωπος, ὡσεὶ χόρτος αἱ ἡμέραι αὐτοῦ· ὡσεὶ ἄνθος τοῦ ἀγροῦ, οὕτως ἐξανθήσει·
16	כִּ֤י ר֣וּחַ עָֽבְרָה־בּ֣וֹ וְאֵינֶ֑נּוּ וְלֹֽא־יַכִּירֶ֖נּוּ ע֣וֹד מְקוֹמֽוֹ׃	For the wind passeth over it, and it is gone; and the place thereof shall know it no more.	ὅτι πνεῦμα διῆλθεν ἐν αὐτῷ, καὶ οὐχ ὑπάρξει καὶ οὐκ ἐπιγνώσεται ἔτι τὸν τόπον αὐτοῦ.
17	וְחֶ֤סֶד יְהֹוָ֨ה ׀ מֵעוֹלָ֣ם וְעַד־ע֭וֹלָם עַל־יְרֵאָ֑יו וְ֝צִדְקָת֗וֹ לִבְנֵ֥י בָנִֽים׃	But the mercy of the LORD is from everlasting to everlasting upon them that fear him, and his righteousness unto children's children;	τὸ δὲ ἔλεος τοῦ Κυρίου ἀπὸ τοῦ αἰῶνος καὶ ἕως τοῦ αἰῶνος ἐπὶ τοὺς φοβουμένους αὐτόν, καὶ ἡ δικαιοσύνη αὐτοῦ ἐπὶ υἱοῖς υἱῶν
18	לְשֹׁמְרֵ֥י בְרִית֑וֹ וּלְזֹכְרֵ֥י פִ֝קֻּדָ֗יו לַעֲשׂוֹתָֽם׃	To such as keep his covenant, and to those that remember his commandments to do them.	τοῖς φυλάσσουσι τὴν διαθήκην αὐτοῦ καὶ μεμνημένοις τῶν ἐντολῶν αὐτοῦ τοῦ ποιῆσαι αὐτάς.
19	יְֽהֹוָ֗ה בַּ֭שָּׁמַיִם הֵכִ֣ין כִּסְא֑וֹ וּ֝מַלְכוּת֗וֹ בַּכֹּ֥ל מָשָֽׁלָה׃	The LORD hath prepared his throne in the heavens; and his kingdom ruleth over all.	Κύριος ἐν τῷ οὐρανῷ ἡτοίμασε τὸν θρόνον αὐτοῦ, καὶ ἡ βασιλεία αὐτοῦ πάντων δεσπόζει.
20	בָּרְכ֥וּ יְהֹוָ֗ה מַלְאָ֫כָ֥יו גִּבֹּ֣רֵי כֹ֭חַ עֹשֵׂ֣י דְבָר֑וֹ לִ֝שְׁמֹ֗עַ בְּק֣וֹל דְּבָרֽוֹ׃	Bless the LORD, ye his angels, that excel in strength, that do his commandments, hearkening unto the voice of his word.	εὐλογεῖτε τὸν Κύριον, πάντες οἱ ἄγγελοι αὐτοῦ, δυνατοὶ ἰσχύϊ ποιοῦντες τὸν λόγον αὐτοῦ τοῦ ἀκοῦσαι τῆς φωνῆς τῶν λόγων αὐτοῦ.
21	בָּרְכ֣וּ יְ֭הֹוָה כׇּל־צְבָאָ֑יו מְ֝שָׁרְתָ֗יו עֹשֵׂ֥י רְצוֹנֽוֹ׃	Bless ye the LORD, all ye his hosts; ye ministers of his, that do his pleasure.	εὐλογεῖτε τὸν Κύριον, πᾶσαι αἱ δυνάμεις αὐτοῦ, λειτουργοὶ αὐτοῦ ποιοῦντες τὸ θέλημα αὐτοῦ·
22	בָּרְכ֤וּ יְהֹוָ֨ה ׀ כׇּֽל־מַעֲשָׂ֗יו בְּכׇל־מְקֹמ֥וֹת מֶמְשַׁלְתּ֑וֹ בָּרְכִ֥י נַ֝פְשִׁ֗י אֶת־יְהֹוָֽה׃	Bless the LORD, all his works in all places of his dominion: bless the LORD, O my soul.	εὐλογεῖτε τὸν Κύριον, πάντα τὰ ἔργα αὐτοῦ, ἐν παντὶ τόπῳ τῆς δεσποτείας αὐτοῦ· εὐλόγει, ἡ ψυχή μου, τὸν Κύριον.

== Sources ==
- Miller, Patrick D. (2013). The Lord of the Psalms. Westminster John Knox Press. ISBN 978-0664239275.
- Pankhurst, Jennifer (2018). "The Conventions of Biblical Poetry". myjewishlearning.com.
- Scherman, Rabbi Nosson (1985). The Complete Artscroll Machzor – Rosh Hashanah (1st ed.). Mesorah Publications Ltd. ISBN 978-0-89906-676-9.
- Scherman, Rabbi Nosson (2003). The Complete Artscroll Siddur (3rd ed.). Mesorah Publications, Ltd. ISBN 978-0899066509.
