= Siegfried Reda =

German composer (1916-1968)

Siegfried Reda (27 July 1916 – 13 December 1968) was a German composer and pipe organ player.

== Life ==
Born in Bochum, Reda studied with Ernst Pepping and Hugo Distler at the Spandauer Kirchenmusikschule and was an organist in Bochum, Gelsenkirchen and Berlin. In 1946 he became director of the Institute for Protestant Church Music at the Folkwang University of the Arts in Essen, and also served as a professor of organ and composition. In 1953 he became church music director at the St.-Petri-Kirche in Mülheim an der Ruhr. His students included Herbert Callhoff, Magdalene Schauss-Flake, Gisbert Schneider and Wolfgang Hufschmidt.

Reda died in Mülheim an der Ruhr. at the age of 52.

In 1996, a square in Mülheim an der Ruhr was named after him.

== Selected works ==
Reda is regarded as one of the most active forces in the renewal of Protestant church music after the Second World War. Accordingly, he mainly wrote music with liturgical references, including three Choral concertos for organ (1946-1952), Psalmbuch for solos and choir a cappella (1948-1949), Die Weihnachtsgeschichte for tenor solo, speaker and 5-part choir (1949), Ecce homo for 4 voices choir (1950), Easter story for solos and choir a cappella (1951), Marienbilder for organ (1955), Orgelsonate (1960), and Requiem vel vivorum consolatio for solos, choir and orchestra (1963).

== Bibliography ==
- Siegfried Bergemann: Chormusik für das Jahr der Kirche. In Württembergische Blätter für Kirchenmusik, 83. Jg. 2016, booklet 1, p. 8–14
- Volker Bräutigam: In der Tradition zum Aufbruch. Siegfried Reda (1916–1968). In Ulrich von Brück (editor): Credo musicale. Komponistenporträts aus der Arbeit des Dresdner Kreuzchores. Bärenreiter, Kassel 1969, pp. 177–195
- Rudolf Faber, Philip Hartmann (editor): Handbuch Orgelmusik. Bärenreiter/Metzler, Stuttgart und Weimar, 2002. ISBN 3-7618-2003-8.
- Elisabeth Reda: Die Kirchenmusik als Ort der Erinnerung. Siegfried Reda zum 100. Geburtstag. In: Forum Kirchenmusik, 67. Jg. 2016, booklet 6, pp. 3–10 (the author is a granddaughter of the composer)
