= Emmy Lisken =

German contralto (1923–2020)

- Born: 3 February 1923; Moers
- Died: 11 October 2020 (aged 97); Berlin
- Occupation: Classical contralto
- Organizations: Theater Basel; Cologne Opera

Emmy Lisken (3 February 1923 in Moers – 11 October 2020 in Berlin) was a German contralto in opera and concert.

== Career ==
Born in Moers, Lisken studied voice at the Konservatorium Düsseldorf with Franziska Martienssen-Lohmann. She was engaged from 1955 at the Theater Basel and the Cologne Opera. In Cologne, she participated in 1957 in the premiere of Wolfgang Fortner's Bluthochzeit in the role of Leonardo's Wife. A live recording of the premiere was issued 50 years later.

From 1958 she worked mainly as a concert and oratorio singer, performing in European countries and at international festivals such as Festival du Marais in Paris.

She recorded compositions by Johann Sebastian Bach with conductors such as Wolfgang Gönnenwein, Helmut Kahlhöfer, Hans Thamm, and others.

Lisken was a voice teacher at the Leopold-Mozart Konservatorium in Augsburg from 1976 to 1998. Her daughter Annette Seiltgen was one of her students.
