= Johann Gramann =

German theologian

Johann Gramann or Graumann (5 July 1487 – 29 April 1541), also known by his pen name Johannes Poliander, was a German pastor, humanist, reformer, and Lutheran leader.

== Life ==
Gramann was born in Neustadt an der Aisch, Middle Franconia. He worked as rector of the Thomasschule in Leipzig. Poliander was Johann Eck's secretary at the 1519 Leipzig Debate, where he met Martin Luther and joined the Protestant Reformation. Poliander became pastor of Altstadt Church in 1525 in Königsberg (Kaliningrad), capital of the new Duchy of Prussia (a fief of the Crown of Poland), succeeding the fiery Johannes Amandus. The humanist was well-regarded by his peers, including the Catholic Johannes Dantiscus. He wrote secular and religious poetry in German and Latin. He was a strong advocate with Albert, Duke of Prussia, for the creation of the University of Königsberg. He donated his personal collection of 1,000 books to Altstadt's council; this became the foundation of the later Königsberg Public Library. He died in Königsberg.

== Hymn ==
Gramann's hymn "Nun lob, mein Seel, den Herren" was set by several composers. Johann Sebastian Bach used it in cantatas and organ preludes, including Gottlob! nun geht das Jahr zu Ende, BWV 28 for the Sunday after Christmas.

== Sources ==
- Albinus, Robert (1985). Lexikon der Stadt Königsberg Pr. und Umgebung (in German). Leer: Verlag Gerhard Rautenberg. p. 371. ISBN 3-7921-0320-6.
- Gause, Fritz (1968). Königsberg in Preußen. Die Geschichte einer europäischen Stadt (in German). München: Gräfe und Unzer. p. 244.
