= Gott, man lobet dich in der Stille =

Gott, man lobet dich in der Stille may refer to:

- Gott, man lobet dich in der Stille, BWV 120, a sacred cantata by J. S. Bach composed before 1730 (or in 1742) in Leipzig for the occasion of Ratswechsel
- Gott, man lobet dich in der Stille, BWV 120b, a cantata by J. S. Bach composed in 1730 to commemorate the Augsburg Confession
- Gott, man lobet dich in der Stille, a Cantata composed by Georg Philipp Telemann for the Peace of Paris in 1763
