= Himmel, Erde, Luft und Meer =

1680 Christian hymn

- Christian hymn
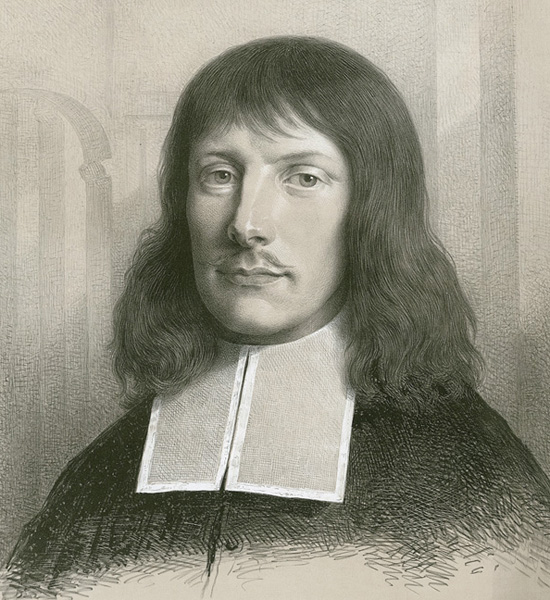
- 19th-century lithograph of Neander
- English: Heaven and Earth, and Sea and Air
- Text: by Joachim Neander
- Language: German
- Based on: Psalms 19
- Melody: by Georg Christoph Strattner
- Composed: 1691
- Published: 1680

"Himmel, Erde, Luft und Meer" (Heaven and Earth, and Sea and Air) is a Christian hymn. The text was written by the German Reformed theologian and hymnwriter Joachim Neander and it was published in 1680. While Neander composed his own melodies, the hymn became known with a new one by Georg Christoph Strattner published in 1691. The topic is praise of God by what he created—sun, moon, and creatures (including the singer)—based on Psalm 19. The hymn was translated into English in several versions. It appears in the current Protestant German hymnal Evangelisches Gesangbuch and in regional sections of the Catholic hymnal Gotteslob.

== History ==
Joachim Neander wrote the text of "Himmel, Erde, Luft und Meer" in Düsseldorf where he worked as a teacher for five years. During this time, he held religious gatherings in the spirit of Pietism and Reformed Christianity, including walks in the nature of a nearby valley which became known as Neandertal, named after him. In the mid-1800s, this name was used to describe the skeletons of prehistoric men discovered in a cave of the park, calling the species Neanderthals. It was here that he wrote many hymns for those meetings, including the popular "Lobe den Herren". He published the songs later in Bremen in 1680, entitling "Himmel, Erde, Luft und Meer" a "Reise-Lied zu Land und Wasser", a song for travel on ground and water. He based it on Psalm 19:1-7. In the collection, Neander wrote his own melodies for the songs, described as "combative" and "exuberant-dancing" in triple meters, which was a provocation for the Orthodox minds at the time. In 1691 Georg Christoph Strattner, a Kapellmeister in Frankfurt, published a fifth edition of Neander's collection, with new melodies for all songs. His melody became used in most hymnals.

"Himmel, Erde, Luft und Meer" was translated into English in several versions, appearing in 81 hymnals, such as "Heaven and Earth, and Sea and Air", translated by Madeleine Forell Marshall in 1993 for the New Century Hymnal, and "Heav’n and earth, the sky, the sea", translated by Paul Wengel (1–4) and Emma B. Meier for the North American Hymnal. It is part of the current Protestant German hymnal Evangelisches Gesangbuch as EG 504 and in regional sections of the Catholic hymnal Gotteslob.

The text is in six stanzas of four lines each, rhyming AABB. The singer, in the first person, sees God as the creator of everything, and sees that heaven and earth, air and water, sun and moon, and all creatures including the singer praise God with thanks. All inner stanzas begin with "Seht" (look), pointing at specific creatures. The final stanza ends with a prayer for an imprint into the singer's soul of what God is and what the singer is. It has been regarded as a song of raising awareness for the environment and its need for protection.
