= Herr Gott, Beherrscher aller Dinge, BWV 120a =

Wedding cantata by Johann Sebastian Bach

Herr Gott, Beherrscher aller Dinge
- BWV 120.2
- Wedding cantata by Johann Sebastian Bach
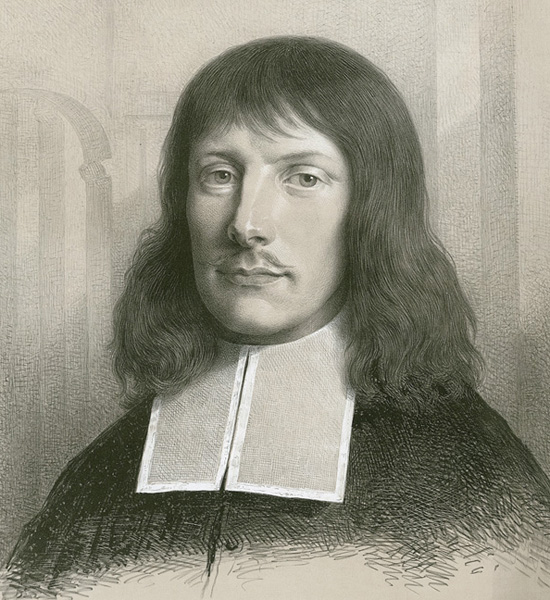
- Joachim Neander, author of the chorale text

Herr Gott, Beherrscher aller Dinge (Lord God, ruler of all things), BWV 120.2 (previously BWV 120a), is a wedding cantata by Johann Sebastian Bach. He composed and first performed it in Leipzig, most likely in 1729.

== History and text ==
Bach composed the cantata for a wedding in Leipzig probably in 1729, "in great haste", according to Klaus Hofmann, looking at Bach's handwriting and mistakes made by the copiers. The music is generally agreed to be of high quality. Bach adapted the opening chorus for the Et expecto resurrectionem mortuorum section of the Mass in B minor, a composition which is widely hailed as one of the greatest in musical history.

The music survives in an incomplete state. There is a fragmentary autograph score and some parts written by various scribes: only the vocal parts, a viola part and three continuo parts are extant. As the cantata shares music with other compositions, particularly BWV 120.1, but also BWV 1006 and BWV 137 (two earlier works), it can be reconstructed. On this basis, the instruments can be assumed to be those specified in the other works including oboes d'amore, trumpets and timpani.

The names of bride and groom are not known. He has been assumed to be a minister of religion, deducted from the text "Herr, fange an, und gib den Segen / auf dieses deines Dieners Haus" (Lord, begin and pronounce your blessing / on this, your servant's house).

The text was written by an anonymous poet. It is in two parts, the second one marked Post copulationem (after the wedding ceremony). The closing chorale is by Joachim Neander, stanzas 4 and 5 of his hymn "Lobe den Herren, den mächtigen König der Ehren".

== Scoring and structure ==
The piece is scored for four solo voices (soprano, alto, tenor, and bass) and a four-part choir. The instruments used are three trumpets, timpani, two oboes, two oboes d'amore, two violins, viola, and basso continuo. One movement, the sinfonia which opens part II of the cantata, features an organ obbligato. Generally, the orchestration is typical of that Bach used for festive occasions, although sometimes he deployed more oboes. The work has eight movements in two parts:

Part 1

1. Chorus: Herr Gott, Beherrscher aller Dinge
2. Recitative (tenor, bass, and choir): Wie wunderbar, o Gott, sind deine Werke
3. Aria (soprano): Leit, o Gott, durch deine Liebe

Part 2

4. Sinfonia
5. Recitative (tenor and choir): Herr Zebaoth, Herr, unsrer Väter Gott
6. Aria (alto, tenor): Herr, fange an und sprich den Segen
7. Recitative (bass): Der Herr, Herr unser Gott, sei mit euch
8. Chorale: Lobe den Herren, der deinen Stand sichtbar gesegnet

== Music ==
Of the eight movements, only the three recitatives (movements 2, 5 and 7) are unique to this cantata. Bach parodied movements 1, 3 and 6 in 1730 in two works:

- a lost cantata Gott, man lobet dich in der Stille, BWV 120.3, celebrating the anniversary of the Augsburg Confession in 1730.
- a cantata for Ratswechsel (Inauguration of a new town council), Gott, man lobet dich in der Stille, BWV 120.1, which Hofmann dates 1742, and according to Bach Digital originated in 1729 or earlier. The respective movement numbers are 2, 4 and 1.

The second movement is in three sections: a secco bass recitative, a choral intervention, and a secco tenor recitative. The first part closes with a "florid" soprano aria in modified ternary form.

Part II opens with a sinfonia which is adapted from the prelude of the partita for violin solo in E major, BWV 1006. The music, which consists almost entirely of semiquavers, is reassigned to the organ with orchestral accompaniment. (This movement can be reconstructed from the opening sinfonia of the cantata for the Ratswechsel of 1731, Wir danken dir, Gott, wir danken dir, BWV 29. The following tenor recitative ends with a choral statement from a litany "Erhör uns, lieber Herre Gott" (Hear us, dear Lord God). The sixth movement is a duet aria in da capo form. The bass recitative, "Der Herr, Herr unser Gott, sei so mit euch" (The Lord, the Lord our God, be so with you), prepares the closing chorale, a setting which appeared as the closing chorale of the chorale cantata Lobe den Herren, den mächtigen König der Ehren, BWV 137, composed in 1725.

== Publication ==
The work was reconstructed by Alfred Dörffel and published in 1894 as part of the Bach Gesellschaft's complete Bach edition. The continuo part is presented as a figured bass.

== Recordings ==
- Amsterdam Baroque Orchestra & Choir, Ton Koopman. J. S. Bach: Complete Cantatas Vol. 20. Antoine Marchand, 2003.
- Bach Collegium Japan, Masaaki Suzuki. J. S. Bach: Cantatas Vol. 51. BIS, 2011.
- Gächinger Kantorei & Bach-Collegium Stuttgart, Helmuth Rilling. „J.S.Bach: The complete works“. 1999/2000 Hänssler Verlag, Germany.
