= Theodor Undereyck =

Theodor Undereyck (born 15 June 1635 in Duisburg, died 1 January 1693 in Bremen) was a Protestant pastor, spiritual writer and pioneer of pietism in the German Reformed Church.

Theodor Undereyck was born in 1635, the son of businessman Gerhard Undereyck and his wife Sara, née Salanger. After the death of his parents in 1636 by the plague, he grew up as an orphan in the house of his uncle Johann Undereyck in Alstaden.

From 1653 to 1658 he studied Protestant theology in Duisburg, Utrecht, and Leiden, under, among others, Gisbert Voetius and Johannes Cocceius. His teachers were partly contrary to one another, but were orthodox Reformed theologians and representatives of continuing reformation. In particular Cocceius strongly influenced him in the direction of a federally theological thought, so that he was also considered one of the major catechists of Coccejanism. Voetius influenced him in the direction of a puritanical way of life and its emphasis on the importance of Christian conventicles. From 1658 to 1659 Undereyck undertook a study trip to Switzerland, France, and England.

In 1660, he became pastor of the Reformed church in Mülheim an der Ruhr. There in about 1661 he led one of the first Pietist conventicles in Germany. From 1668 he was an associate court preacher in Kassel to Landgravine Hedwig Sophie (1623–1683). In 1670 he became pastor at St. Martin's Church in Bremen and remained so until his death. Despite initial difficulties with the clergy, his ministry helped the breakthrough of Pietism. His followers Joachim Neander and Cornelius de Hare (whose funeral sermon provides biographical information on Undereyck) translated and continued Undereyck's work.

Undereyck published 5 books, including two catechisms and a lay dogmatics, in which he conveyed the ideas of the English and Dutch Reformed theology to German-speaking readers in edifying language. He dedicated his most extensive and sophisticated writing to the fight against emerging atheism in Age of Enlightenment.

== Family ==
He married Margaretha Hüls, the daughter of Pastor Hulaius of Wesel.

== Works ==
- Christi Braut/ Unter den Töchtern zu Laodicaea/ Das ist/ Ein hochnöthiger Tractat/ In diesen letzten Tagen. Darinnen Die lebendige Krafft des seeligmachenden Glaubens von allen Schmach=Reden der in dieser Zeit Christ=scheinender Spötter/ nicht nur auß H. Schrifft: sondern auch auß gleichlautenden Zeugnüssen der darin gottseelig erfahrnen und Gott gelährten Männern gereiniget und verthädiget wird. Hanau 1670; 2. Auflage Cassel 1697
- Wegweiser der Einfältigen zu den ersten Buchstaben des wahren Christentums, meistenteils nach der Ordnung der fünf Hauptstück Christlicher Religion. Bremen 1676
- Hallelujah/ Das ist/ GOTT in dem Sünder verkläret. Oder Des sünders Wanderstab zur Erkäntnüs/ Geniessung/ und Verklärung GOTTes/ alß des höchsten Gutes. Bremen 1678; 2. Auflage Herborn 1722; holländische Übers. 1684; dt. Auszug u.d.T: Eheliches Ja-Wort der gläubigen Seele. Hrsg. von Ch. Staehelin. Bern 1719; 2. Auflage Bern 1731
- Der Einfältige Christ/ Durch wahren Glauben mit Christo vereinigt/ und nach offt begangenem Mißbrauch/ zu dem rechten Gebrauch des H. Abendmahls/ daß Der Herr Jesus wird [...] mit Feuerflammen Rache üben/ über die so GOtt nicht erkennen/ und nicht gehorsam sind dem Euangelio unsers HErrn Jesu Christi/ 2. Thesal. 1,8 [...]. Bremen 1681; 2. Auflage Eschwege 1700
- Der Närrische Atheist/ Entdeckt und seiner Thorheit überzeuget/ In Zwey Theilen In dem Ersten/ Als ein solcher/ der da wissentlich willens und vorsetzlich/ ihme selbst und anderen/ die Gedancken/ welche sie von GOtt haben/ nehmen wil. In dem Zweyten/ Als ein solcher/ der da unwissend und ungemerckt/ auch unter dem Schein des wahren Christenthums/ ohne GOtt in der Welt lebet. Bremen 1689; 2. Auflage Bremen 1722; holländische Übersetzung Amsterdam 1702.

== Bibliography ==
- Do-Hong Jou: Theodor Undereyck und die Anfänge des reformierten Pietismus. Brockmeyer, Bochum 1994
- Werner Raupp (2000). "Undereyck, Theodor". In Bautz, Traugott (ed.). Biographisch-Bibliographisches Kirchenlexikon (BBKL) (in German). Vol. 17. Herzberg: Bautz. cols. 1439–1443. ISBN 3-88309-080-8.(with detailed bibliography).
