= Georg Christoph Strattner =

- Born: c. 1645; Gols, Burgenland, Austria
- Died: April 1704 (aged 58–59); Weimar, Germany
- Occupations: Musician, composer, hymn writer
- Known for: Hymn melodies

Georg Christoph Strattner (c. 1645 – April 1704) was a German church musician, composer, and hymn writer.

Strattner was born in Gols, then in the Hungarian Burgenland. He received his first musical training from his cousin Samuel Capricornus who was the music director at the Dreifaltigkeitskirche in Preßburg. At age fourteen, he became a choir boy at the Stuttgart court chapel.

By 1675 he was Capellmeister to Margrave Frederick of Baden and Hochberg of Frankfurt and by 1682, he was Capellmeister at Frankfurt; however, he was expelled from the city in 1691.

In 1694, he found employment at the court chapel in Weimar and was promoted to vice capellmeister (Particulier Kammermusikus und Vice-Capellmeister) in 1695, succeeding August Kühnel, with Samuel Drese as capellmeister.

Strattner composed several cantatas of which about twenty are extant in manuscripts, and hymns, often with melodies like arias. His hymns include ‘Father, lead me day by day’. He composed melodies for hymns by Joachim Neander for a new 1691 publication. Strattner’s melody for "Himmel, Erde, Luft und Meer" is still part of hymnals.

Strattner died in Weimar where he was buried on 11 April 1704.

== Family ==
Strattner was married twice; his second wedding was in 1689 to Anna Elisabeth Abt Bischofs.

== Selected works ==
- (ed): Joachimi Neandri Vermehrte Glaub- und Liebes-Ubung : Auffgemuntert durch einfältige Bundes-Lieder/ Und Danck-Psalmen; Gegründet auff den zwischen Gott und dem Sünder im Blut Jesu befestigten Friedens-Schluß/ Zu lesen und zu singen auff Reisen/ Zu Hauß/ oder bey Christ-Ergetzungen im Grünen/ Durch ein geheiligtes Hertzens-Halleluja. Franckfurt: Andreä, 1691

== Literature ==
- Elisabeth Mentzel (1893). "Strattner, Georg Christoph" . Allgemeine Deutsche Biographie (in German). Vol. 36. Leipzig: Duncker & Humblot. pp. 520–524.
- Hermann Schemmel: Strattner, Georg Christoph. In: Wolfgang Herbst (ed.): Komponisten und Liederdichter des evangelischen Gesangbuchs. (= Handbuch zum Evangelischen Gesangbuch; vol. 2). Vandenhoeck und Ruprecht, Göttingen 1999, ISBN 3-525-50318-0, p. 316
