= Praise to the Lord, the Almighty =

1680 Christian hymn

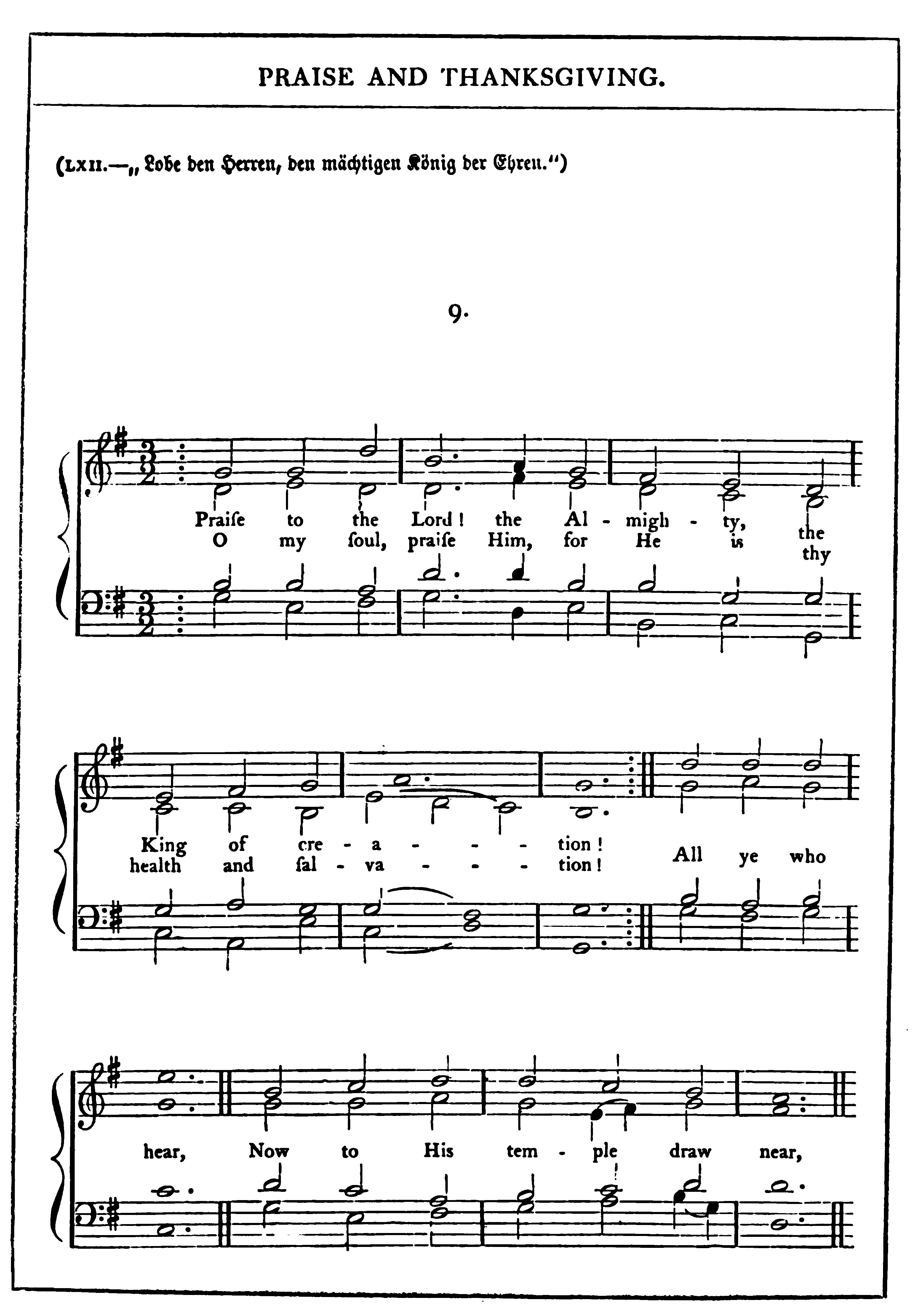
- Words and music (p. 1) as published in The Chorale Book for England in 1865
- Native name: "Lobe den Herren, den mächtigen König der Ehren"
- Text: by Joachim Neander; trans. Catherine Winkworth
- Language: German
- Based on: Psalms 103; Psalms 150
- Published: 1680 (original); 1863 (English)

"Praise to the Lord, the Almighty" is a Christian hymn based on Joachim Neander's German-language hymn "Lobe den Herren, den mächtigen König der Ehren", published in 1680. John Julian in his A Dictionary of Hymnology calls the German original "a magnificent hymn of praise to God, perhaps the finest creation of its author, and of the first rank in its class."

The melody used by Neander, first published in 1665, exists in many versions and is probably based on a folk tune. It is catalogued as Zahn number 1912c with several variants. The text paraphrases Psalm 103 and Psalm 150. Catherine Winkworth published her English translation of Neander's hymn in 1863.

== History ==
The common name given to this melody is "Lobe den Herren". Several variants were published with various secular texts between 1665 and 1680, when Joachim Neander published his German hymn "Lobe den Herren, den mächtigen König der Ehren", using its meter.

It was the favorite hymn of King Frederick William III of Prussia, who first heard it in 1800.

== Text ==
Julian's A Dictionary of Hymnology lists more than ten English translations of "Lobe den Herren" printed in various 19th-century hymnals. The one most commonly appearing in modern hymnals is by Catherine Winkworth, with various editorial alterations.

Hymnologist Lionel Adey uses Winkworth's translation as an example of translators' reshaping a text to their own era's tastes, noting that she discards the German Renaissance flavor of psaltery and harp to introduce a mention of "health" more typical of 19th-century Christianity. Although he praises other translations by Winkworth, and describes this one as a 20th-century "classic", he critiques her changes to the sense of Neander's text as an example of "muscular Christianity tinged with Philistinism".

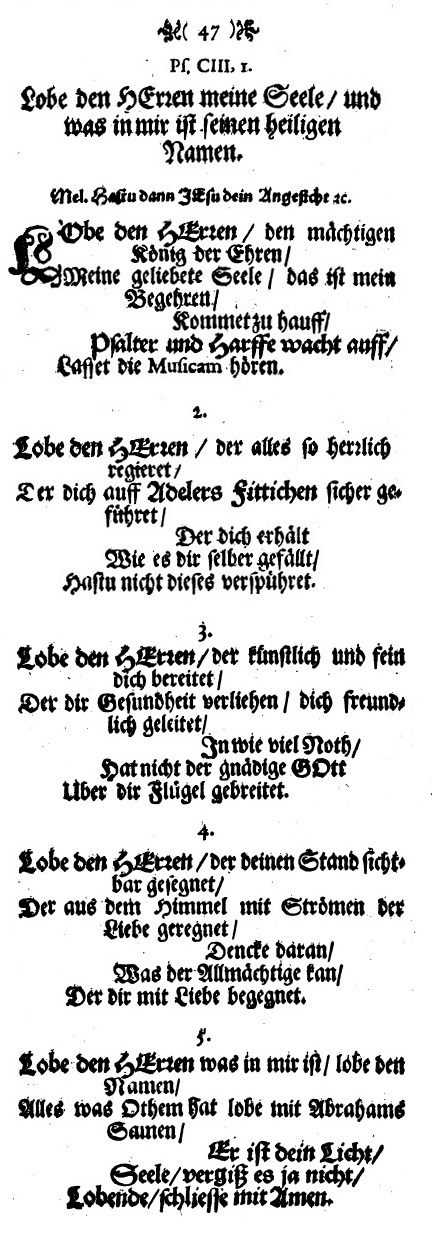
"Lobe den Herren", 1686

Original German text

1. Lobe den Herren, den mächtigen König der Ehren,
meine geliebete Seele, das ist mein Begehren.
Kommet zuhauf,
Psalter und Harfe, wacht auf,
lasset den Lobgesang (Note: Neander: die Musicam [the music]) hören!

2. Lobe den Herren, der alles so herrlich regieret,
der dich auf Adelers Fittichen sicher geführet,
der dich erhält,
wie es dir selber gefällt;
hast du nicht dieses verspüret?

3. Lobe den Herren, der künstlich und fein dich bereitet,
der dir Gesundheit verliehen, dich freundlich geleitet.
In wieviel Not
hat nicht der gnädige Gott
über dir Flügel gebreitet!

4. Lobe den Herren, der deinen Stand sichtbar gesegnet,
der aus dem Himmel mit Strömen der Liebe geregnet.
Denke daran,
was der Allmächtige kann,
der dir mit Liebe begegnet.

5. Lobe den Herren, was in mir ist, lobe den Namen.
Alles, was Odem hat, lobe mit Abrahams Samen.
Er ist dein Licht,
Seele, vergiss es ja nicht.
Lobende, schließe mit Amen!

English translation by Catherine Winkworth

1. Praise to the Lord! the Almighty, the King of creation!
O my soul, praise Him, for He is thy health and salvation!
All ye who hear,
Now to His temple draw near,
Join me in glad adoration!

2. Praise to the Lord! who o’er all things so wondrously reigneth,
Shelters thee under His wings, yea, so gently sustaineth:
Hast thou not seen
How thy desires have been
Granted in what He ordaineth? (Note: Winkworth's stanza 2 corresponds with Neander's original stanzas 2 and 3.)

3. Praise to the Lord! who doth prosper thy work, and defend thee;
Surely His goodness and mercy here daily attend thee;
Ponder anew
What the Almighty can do,
If with His love He befriend thee!

4. Praise to the Lord! Oh let all that is in me adore Him!
All that hath life and breath, come now with praises before Him!
Let the Amen
Sound from His people again,
Gladly for aye we adore Him!

Literal translation

1. Praise the Lord, the mighty King of Glory,
my beloved soul; that is my desire.
Come en masse;
psaltery and harp, awake;
let the song of praise be heard!

2. Praise the Lord, who rules everything so nobly,
who guides you safely on eagle's wings,
who preserves you
as is pleasing to you;
have you not felt this?

3. Praise the Lord, who artfully and finely prepares you,
who grants you health, guides you as a friend.
Through how much danger
has not the merciful God
spread wings over you!

4. Praise the Lord, who visibly blesses your state,
who out of Heaven rains streams of love.
Think about it,
what the Almighty can do,
who meets you with love.

5. Praise the Lord, whatever is within me, praise the name.
Praise [Him], all that has breath, along with Abraham's seed.
He is your light,
soul, do not forget it.
Finish praising with an Amen!

=== Other translations ===
The hymn was translated into French by Swiss pastor Jules-Marcel Nicole (1907-1997) with the title Loué soit Dieu, le Seigneur.

== Musical settings ==
Johann Sebastian Bach used the chorale as the base for his chorale cantata Lobe den Herren, den mächtigen König der Ehren, BWV 137, in 1725. Although only the text of the outer stanzas was kept completely, he referred to the unusual melody in bar form with a Stollen of five measures and a climax at the beginning of the Abgesang in all movements but one. Conductor John Eliot Gardiner assumes, looking at the festive instrumentation and the general content of praise and thanksgiving, that the cantata was also performed that year to celebrate Ratswahl, the inauguration of the Leipzig city council. In 1729 Bach concluded his wedding cantata Herr Gott, Beherrscher aller Dinge, BWV 120a, with the final movement of the chorale cantata, transposed to D major. Bach transcribed the second movement of cantata 137 as the last of his Schübler Chorales for solo organ, BWV 650.

Several other notable composers used the tune in chorale preludes for organ, including Johann Gottfried Walther and Johann Kirnberger. Max Reger also wrote preludes on the tune, as No. 24 of his 52 chorale preludes, Op. 67, in 1902, and as part of his collection Op. 135a. He also used the tune in Sieben Stücke, Op. 145. Johann Nepomuk David composed a toccata on the melody.

The German choral composer Hugo Distler produced a popular arrangement of the hymn for a cappella chorus, as part of his Drei kleine Choralmotetten. The choral arrangement by F. Melius Christiansen is the most popular choral setting of the hymn in the United States.
