= Ratswahl Cantata =

Ratswahl Cantata (German: Ratswahlkantate) can refer to the following cantatas by J. S. Bach:

- Gott ist mein König, BWV 71 (1708)
- Gott, man lobet dich in der Stille, BWV 120 (1728?)
- Wir danken dir, Gott, wir danken dir, BWV 29 (1731)
