= Lobe den Herren, den mächtigen König der Ehren, BWV 137 =

1725 cantata by Johann Sebastian Bach

Lobe den Herren, den mächtigen König der Ehren
- BWV 137
- Chorale cantata by J. S. Bach
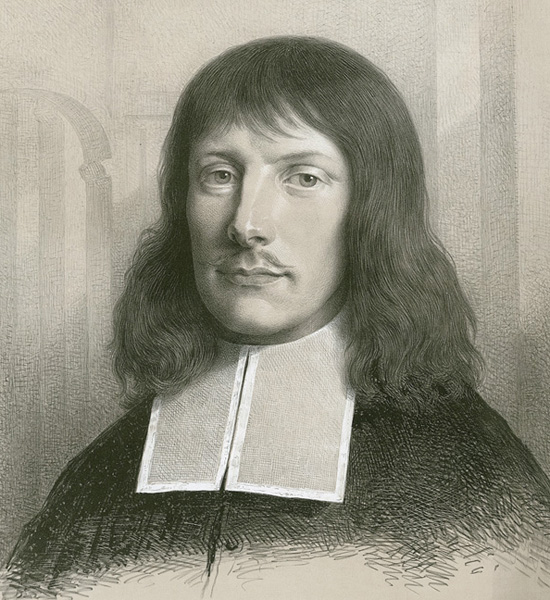
- Joachim Neander, the author of the hymn text
- Occasion: Twelfth Sunday after Trinity
- Chorale: "Lobe den Herren, den mächtigen König der Ehren by Joachim Neander
- Performed: 19 August 1725: Leipzig
- Movements: five
- Vocal: SATB choir and solo
- Instrumental: 3 trumpets; timpani; 2 oboes; 2 violins; viola; continuo

Johann Sebastian Bach composed the church cantata Lobe den Herren, den mächtigen König der Ehren (Praise the Lord, the mighty King of honor), BWV 137, in Leipzig for the twelfth Sunday after Trinity and led the first performance on 19 August 1725. The chorale cantata is based on the hymn by Joachim Neander, a general song of praise published in 1680.

Bach composed the cantata in his third year in office as Thomaskantor in Leipzig. He set the unchanged text of the hymn to music, structuring the cantata in five movements, with choral outer movements framing three intimate arias. He scored it for four vocal soloists, a four-part choir, and a festive Baroque instrumental ensemble of three trumpets with timpani, two oboes, strings and continuo. The chorale melody is present in all of the movements, in varied treatment.

Bach used the second movement for his Schübler Chorales, and made the closing chorale, which unusually features independent parts for the trumpets and timpani, also part of a 1729 wedding cantata.

== History and words ==
In office as Thomaskantor, director of church music in Leipzig, Bach composed Lobe den Herren, den mächtigen König der Ehren for the Twelfth Sunday after Trinity. It forms part of a cycle of chorale cantatas which Bach composed mainly from mid-1724, his second year in the position. He had composed chorale cantatas between the first Sunday after Trinity of 1724 and Palm Sunday, but for Easter had returned to cantatas on more varied texts, possibly because he lost his librettist. Later, Bach composed more chorale cantatas to complete the cycle. This cantata is one of the completing works. It is based entirely on the unchanged words on the hymn "Lobe den Herren, den mächtigen König der Ehren" (1680) by Joachim Neander.

The prescribed readings for the Sunday were from the Second Epistle to the Corinthians, the ministry of the Spirit (2 Corinthians 3:4–11), and from the Gospel of Mark, the healing of a deaf mute man (Mark 7:31–37). Unlike most chorale cantatas of the second cycle, but similar to the early Christ lag in Todes Banden, BWV 4, Bach retained the chorale text unchanged, thus without a reference to the readings.

John Eliot Gardiner assumes, looking at the festive instrumentation and the general content of praise and thanksgiving, that the cantata was also performed that year to celebrate Ratswahl, the inauguration of the town council. In 1729 Bach used the setting of the final chorale, transposed to D major, to conclude the wedding cantata Herr Gott, Beherrscher aller Dinge, BWV 120a, with the last two stanzas of the hymn. With its general content of praise, and no specific narrative, the cantata is suitable for many occasions.

== Music ==
=== Structure and scoring ===
Bach structured the cantata into five movements. A chorale fantasia and a closing chorale frame a sequence of three arias for vocal soloists with accompaniment of obbligato instruments. Bach scored the work for four vocal soloists (soprano, alto, tenor and bass), a four-part choir and a festive Baroque instrumental ensemble of three trumpets (Tr), timpani, two oboes (Ob), two violins (Vl), viola (Va), and basso continuo. The duration is given as 18 minutes.

In the following table of the movements, the scoring follows the Neue Bach-Ausgabe. The keys and time signatures are taken from Alfred Dürr's Die Kantaten von Johann Sebastian Bach. The continuo, playing throughout, and the timpani, always playing with the three trumpets, are not shown.

Movements of Lobe den Herren, den mächtigen König der Ehren
| No. | Title | Type | Vocal | Winds | Strings | Key | Time |
|---|---|---|---|---|---|---|---|
| 1 | Lobe den Herren, den mächtigen König der Ehren | Chorus | SATB | 3Tr 2Ob | 2Vl Va | C major | 3/4 |
| 2 | Lobe den Herren, der alles so herrlich regieret | Aria (chorale) | A | | Vl solo | G major | 9/8 |
| 3 | Lobe den Herren, der künstlich und fein dich bereitet | Aria (duet) | S B | 2Ob | | E minor | 3/4 |
| 4 | Lobe den Herren, der deinen Stand sichtbar gesegnet | Aria | T | Tr (or Ob) | | A minor | 3/4 |
| 5 | Lobe den Herren, was in mir ist, lobe den Namen | Chorale | SATB | 3Tr | 2Vl Va | C major | 3/4 |

=== Movements ===
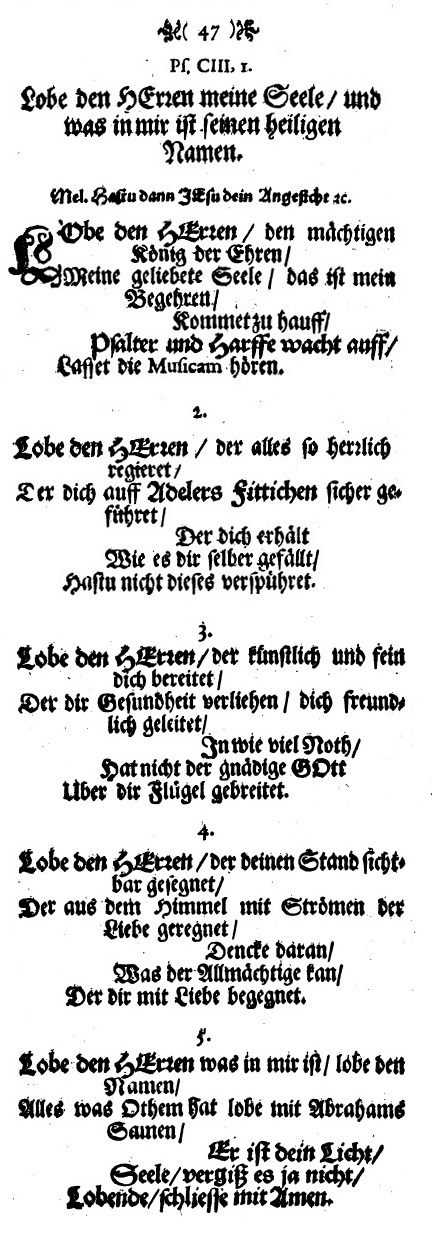
The hymn text in a 1686 print

As Dürr and Gardiner observed, the text as well as the chorale melody is present in all movements. The melody in bar form has an unusual Stollen of five measures and reaches a climax at the beginning of the Abgesang, which Bach also stresses in a variety of means in the movements. The cantata is constructed in symmetry: the soprano carries the melody in the outer movements; in the second movement it is sung by the alto, and in the fourth movement played by the trumpet. In the central movement, the beginning of both the vocal and the instrumental theme are derived from it for the cantata's most intimate setting.

==== 1 ====
In the opening chorus, "Lobe den Herren, den mächtigen König der Ehren" (Praise the Lord, the mighty King of honor), the first stanza of the hymn, is rendered as a chorale fantasia. The trumpets, oboes and strings begin with an instrumental concerto; the soprano sings the cantus firmus while the lower voices prepare the entries by imitation of the instrumental motifs. For the words "Kommet zu Hauf, Psalter und Harfen, wacht auf" (Come join the crowd, psaltery and harps, awake!), the setting is homophonic and thus singled out.

==== 2 ====
In the second movement, "Lobe den Herren, der alles so herrlich regieret" (Praise the Lord, who directs everything so gloriously), a solo violin accompanies the embellished melody of the chorale. Bach included this movement in his Schübler Chorales, but on a text for Advent, "Kommst du nun, Jesu, vom Himmel herunter auf Erden" ('Come thou, Jesu, from heaven to earth').

==== 3 ====
The third stanza, "Lobe den Herren, der künstlich und fein dich bereitet" (Praise the Lord, who prepares you wisely and well), is set as a duet of soprano and bass. In great contrast to C major and G major, the central movement is in E minor. Two obbligato oboes take part in the setting; their motifs are derived from the beginning of the chorale melody. In an unusual way, the first vocal section is repeated three times; only the words "In wieviel Not" (in how much suffering) are set differently, in "grinding chromatic descent".

==== 4 ====
The fourth movement, "Lobe den Herren, der deinen Stand sichtbar gesegnet" (Praise the Lord, who surely blesses your condition), is in A minor, but the cantus firmus of the trumpet is nonetheless in C major, in "a battle for harmonic supremacy". In the final movement of his Christmas Oratorio Bach would later embed the chorale in Phrygian mode in a concerto in D major. The independent vocal line quotes parts of the chorale melody several times. The words "Denke daran" (consider this) are accented by a different metre, matching the slightly changed words "Denke dran".

==== 5 ====
For the closing chorale, Bach set the last hymn stanza, "Lobe den Herren, was in mir ist, lobe den Namen!" (Praise the Lord, what is within me, praise his name!), as four-part vocal setting doubled by the strings and oboes, with independent parts for three trumpets and timpani. The first trumpet "[soaring] above all", illustrates the words of the final lines effectively for an affirmative conclusion. Gardiner notes that Bach "knew exactly how best to use the resources of the ceremonial trumpet-led orchestra and choir of his day to convey unbridled joy and majesty".

== Manuscripts and publication ==
The manuscripts of the original parts of Lobe den Herren are extant, while the original score is lost. An extant copy of the score made by Christian Friedrich Penzel, and dated 1755, assigns the cantata to St. John's Day (24 June). It is unclear if this designation was copied from Bach's score.

The first critical edition of the cantata, edited by Wilhelm Rust, was published by the Bach Gesellschaft in 1881 as part of its complete edition of Bach's works. In the Neue Bach-Ausgabe, the second edition of Bach's works, the cantata was published in 1986, edited by Klaus Hofmann.

== Recordings ==
The entries are taken from the listing on the Bach Cantatas Website. Ensembles playing period instruments in historically informed performances are marked green under the header Instr..

Recordings of Lobe den Herren, den mächtigen König der Ehren
| Title | Conductor / Choir / Orchestra | Soloists | Label | Year | Instr. |
|---|---|---|---|---|---|
| Bach Made in Germany Vol. 1 – Cantatas VII | Günther Ramin Thomanerchor Gewandhausorchester | soloists of Thomanerchor; Gert Lutze; Johannes Oettel | Eterna | 1953 | |
| J. S. Bach: Cantatas BWV 137 & BWV 190 | Hans Thamm Windsbacher Knabenchor Consortium Musicum | Teresa Żylis-Gara; Ingeborg Ruß; Peter Schreier; Franz Crass | EMI | 1966 | |
| Les Grandes Cantates de J.S. Bach Vol. 27 | Fritz Werner Heinrich-Schütz-Chor Heilbronn Württemberg Chamber Orchestra Heilbronn | Ingeborg Reichelt; Barbara Scherler; Friedrich Melzer; Bruce Abel | Erato | 1973 | |
| Bach Cantatas Vol. 4 – Sundays after Trinity I | Karl Richter Münchener Bach-Chor Münchener Bach-Orchester | Edith Mathis; Julia Hamari; Peter Schreier; Dietrich Fischer-Dieskau | Archiv Produktion | 1977 | |
| Die Bach Kantate Vol. 10 | Helmuth Rilling Gächinger Kantorei Bach-Collegium Stuttgart | Arleen Auger; Gabriele Schreckenbach; Adalbert Kraus; Walter Heldwein | Hänssler | 1982 | |
| Bach Made in Germany Vol. 4 – Cantatas IV | Hans-Joachim Rotzsch Thomanerchor Neues Bachisches Collegium Musicum | Arleen Auger; Ortrun Wenkel; Peter Schreier; Theo Adam | Eterna | 1982 | Period |
| J. S. Bach: Das Kantatenwerk • Complete Cantatas • Les Cantates, Fol / Vol. 2 | Nikolaus Harnoncourt Tölzer Knabenchor Concentus Musicus Wien | soloist of the Tölzer Knabenchor; Paul Esswood; Kurt Equiluz; Albert Hartinger | Teldec | 1982 | Period |
| Bach Edition Vol. 19 – Cantatas Vol. 10 | Pieter Jan Leusink Holland Boys Choir Netherlands Bach Collegium | Marjon Strijk; Sytse Buwalda; Knut Schoch; Bas Ramselaar | Brilliant Classics | 2000 | Period |
| Bach Cantatas Vol. 6: Köthen/Frankfurt | John Eliot Gardiner Monteverdi Choir English Baroque Soloists | Katharine Fuge; Robin Tyson; Christoph Genz; Peter Harvey | Soli Deo Gloria | 2000 | Period |
| J. S. Bach: Complete Cantatas Vol. 18 | Ton Koopman Amsterdam Baroque Orchestra & Choir | Johannette Zomer; Christoph Prégardien; Klaus Mertens | Antoine Marchand | 2002 | Period |
| J. S. Bach: Cantatas Vol. 40 – BWV 79, 137, 164, 168 | Masaaki Suzuki Bach Collegium Japan | Yukari Nonoshita; Robin Blaze; Makoto Sakurada; Peter Kooy | BIS | 2007 | Period |
| J. S. Bach: Lobe den Herren, den mächtigen König der Ehren, BWV 137 – Cantata, BWV 137 | Peter Dijkstra Netherlands Bach Society | Miriam Feuersinger; Alex Potter; Thomas Hobbs; Peter Kooy | Netherlands Bach Society | 2017 | Period |
