= Op. 145 =

In music, Op. 145 stands for Opus number 145. Compositions that are assigned this number include:

- Castelnuovo-Tedesco – Fantasia
- Reger – Sieben Stücke, Op. 145
- Ries – Three Flute Quartets
- Schumann – Romanzen und Balladen, Vol. III
