= Es kommt ein Schiff, geladen =

Advent season chorale and Marian Hymn

- Advent song
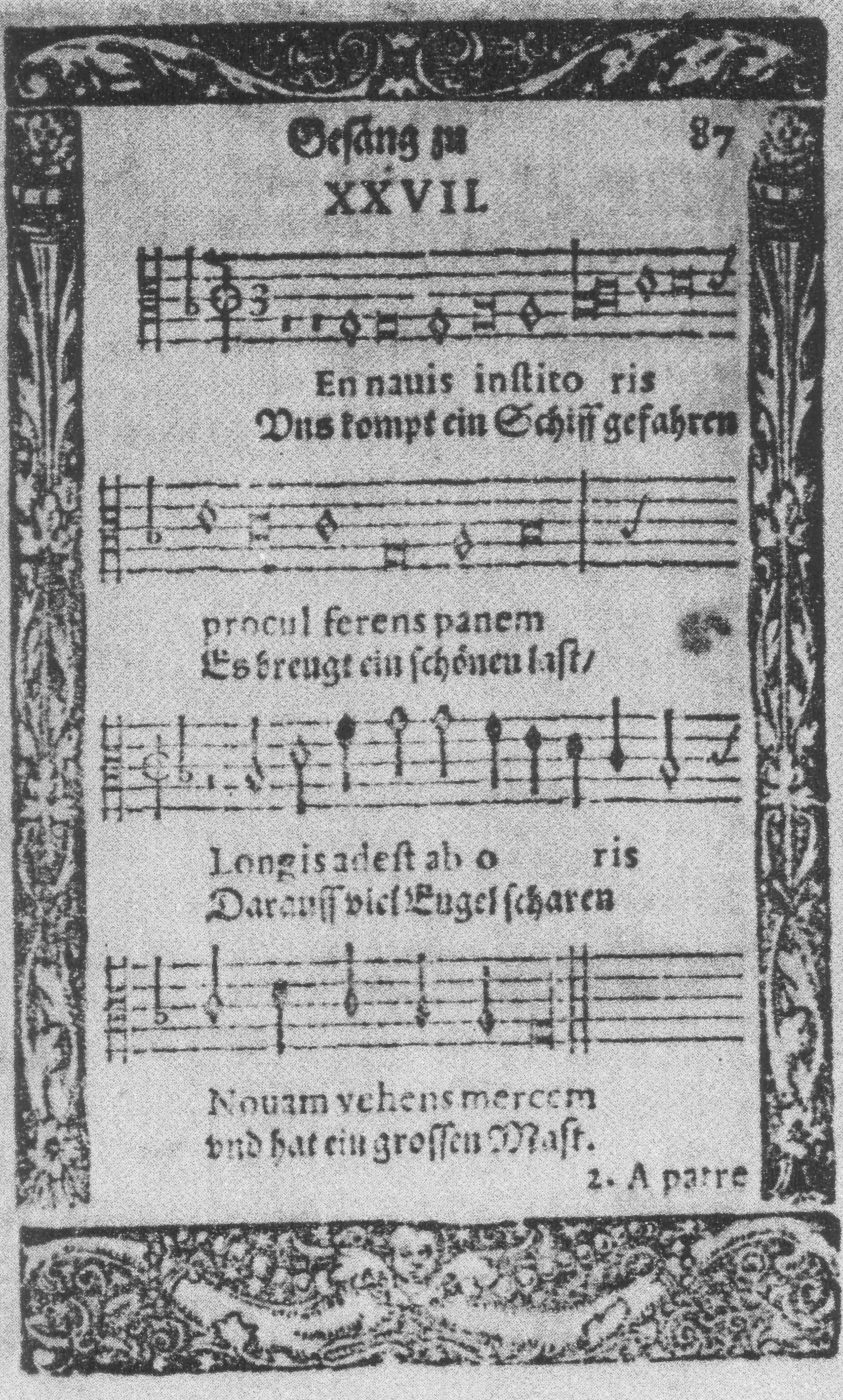
- "Uns kompt ein Schiff gefahren", Andernacher Gesangbuch, Cologne 1608, oldest evidence of the song
- Written: before 1450
- Text: Johannes Tauler?
- Language: German
- Published: 1608

"Es kommt ein Schiff, geladen" ("A ship is coming, laden"), is an Advent season chorale and Marian Hymn. It is one of the oldest religious songs of German origin.

== History ==
The oldest existing text source is a manuscript dated before 1450. It was found in the Strasbourg Dominican convent of St. Nikolaus in undis. Due to the fact that the mystic Johannes Tauler visited this convent frequently, the lyrics of this song are attributed to him. Reference is the word "enphohet" (received) which is characteristically used by Tauler very often.

The lyrics are typical for the allegory in the Middle Ages as a vital element in the synthesis of biblical and classical traditions. Biblical motifs compare the pregnant Virgin Mary with a loaded entering ship. The ship is set in motion under sail (correspondent to love) and mast (correspondent to the Holy Spirit).

The oldest source of the melody is included in Andernacher Hymns (1608). The song is found there in bilingual text under the title "Vns kompt ein Schiff gefahren" as well as the Latin "En nauis institoris".

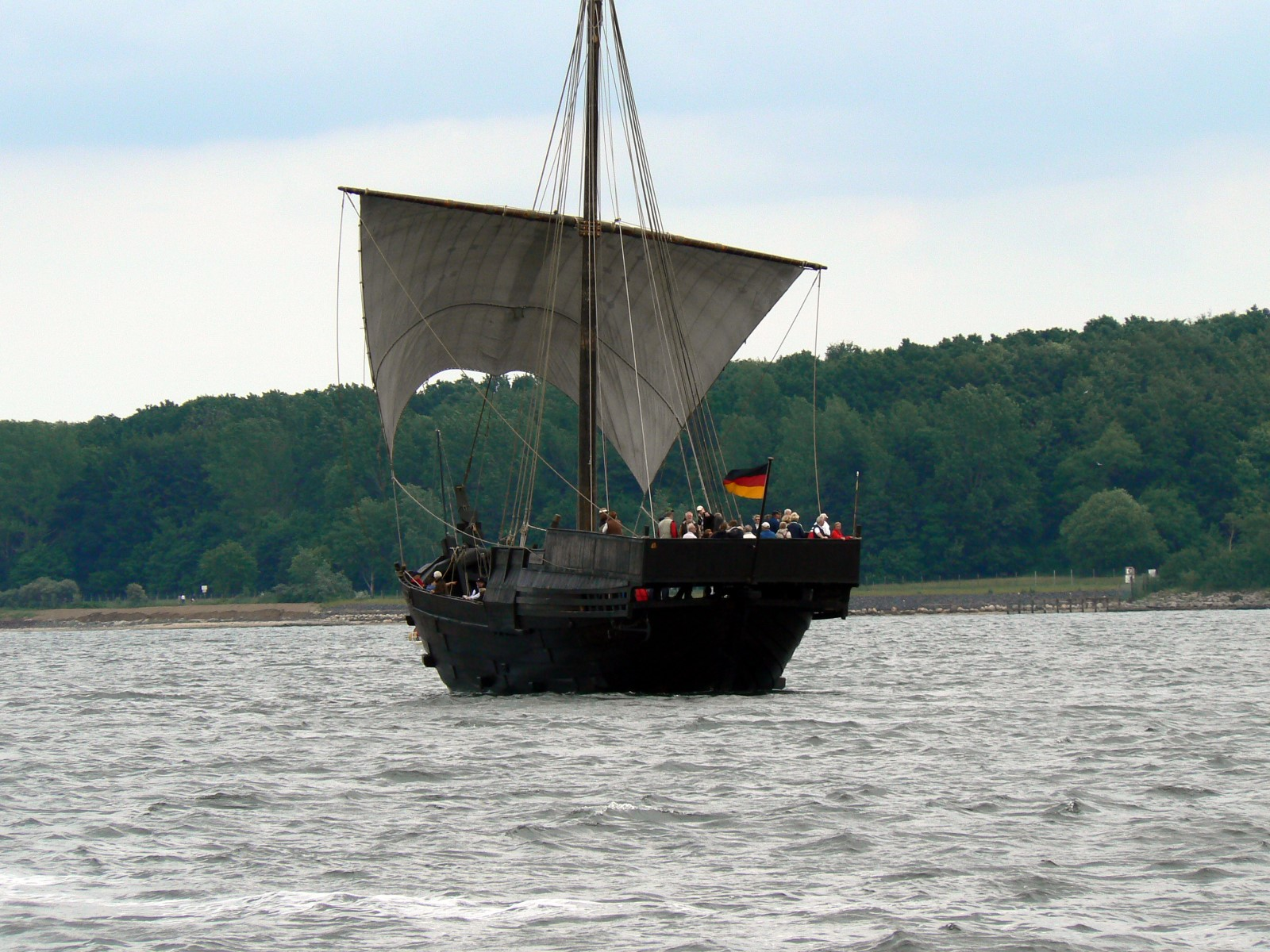
2007 replica of a 1380 Bremen cog

== Lyrics ==
"Es kommt ein Schiff, geladen"
Played by the carillon of St. Martin's Church, Bremen

Several arrangements in MIDI

Es kommt ein Schiff, geladen
bis an sein' höchsten Bord,
trägt Gottes Sohn voll Gnaden,
des Vaters ewigs Wort.

Das Schiff geht still im Triebe,
es trägt ein teure Last;
das Segel ist die Liebe,
der Heilig Geist der Mast.

Der Anker haft' auf Erden,
da ist das Schiff am Land.
Das Wort will Fleisch uns werden,
der Sohn ist uns gesandt.

Zu Bethlehem geboren
im Stall ein Kindelein,
gibt sich für uns verloren;
gelobet muß es sein.

Und wer dies Kind mit Freuden
umfangen, küssen will,
muß vorher mit ihm leiden
groß Pein und Marter viel,

danach mit ihm auch sterben
und geistlich auferstehn,
das ewig Leben erben,
wie an ihm ist geschehn.

There comes a galley, laden
Up to the highest board;
She bears a heav'nly burthen,
The Father's eterne Word.

She saileth on in silence,
Her freight of value vast:
With Charity for mainsail,
And Holy Ghost for mast.

The ship has dropt her anchor,
Is safely come to land;
The Word eterne, in likeness
Of man, on earth doth stand.

At Bethlem in a stable,
To save the world forlorn
(O bless Him for His mercy),
Our Saviour Christ is born.

And whosoe'er with gladness
Would kiss him and adore,
Must first endure with Jesus
Great pain and anguish sore.

Must die with Him moreover,
And rise in flesh again,
To win that life eternal,
Which doth to Christ pertain.

== Melody ==
c.f. = cantus firmus

== Musical setting ==
Max Reger quotes the tune in his organ pieces Sieben Stücke, Op. 145.
