= Newton's Grace =

Newton’s Grace (working title: But Now I See) is a 2017 American historical drama film about John Newton, a slave ship captain and later Church of England pastor who wrote many hymns, including Amazing Grace. The film, directed by John Jackman (maker of the 2009 film Wesley), is based on Newton’s autobiography, Out of the Depths. Jackman used the tall ship Hector in Pictou, Nova Scotia, for filming many seafaring scenes. Scenes set on the coast of Sierra Leone were filmed at various locations on the North Carolina coast, particularly Fort Anderson and Fort Macon. Interiors and green screen special effects shots were filmed in Winston-Salem, North Carolina. The film stars Erik Nelson as the young John Newton. The film premiered at the deCoste Centre in Pictou, on May 13, 2017.
