= John Jenkins Husband =

English composer and clergyman

John Jenkins Husband (c. 1753 – 21 March 1825) was an English composer and clergyman who composed hymns including "Revive Us Again", "We Are on the Journey Home" and "We Praise Thee, O God". Born in Plymouth, England, Husband was a clerk at Surrey Chapel. He relocated to the United States in 1809 and worked as a music teacher and parish clerk in Philadelphia, where he died.
