= Sieben Stücke, Op. 145 =

1915–1916 composition by Max Reger

Sieben Stücke
- für Orgel
- Organ music by Max Reger
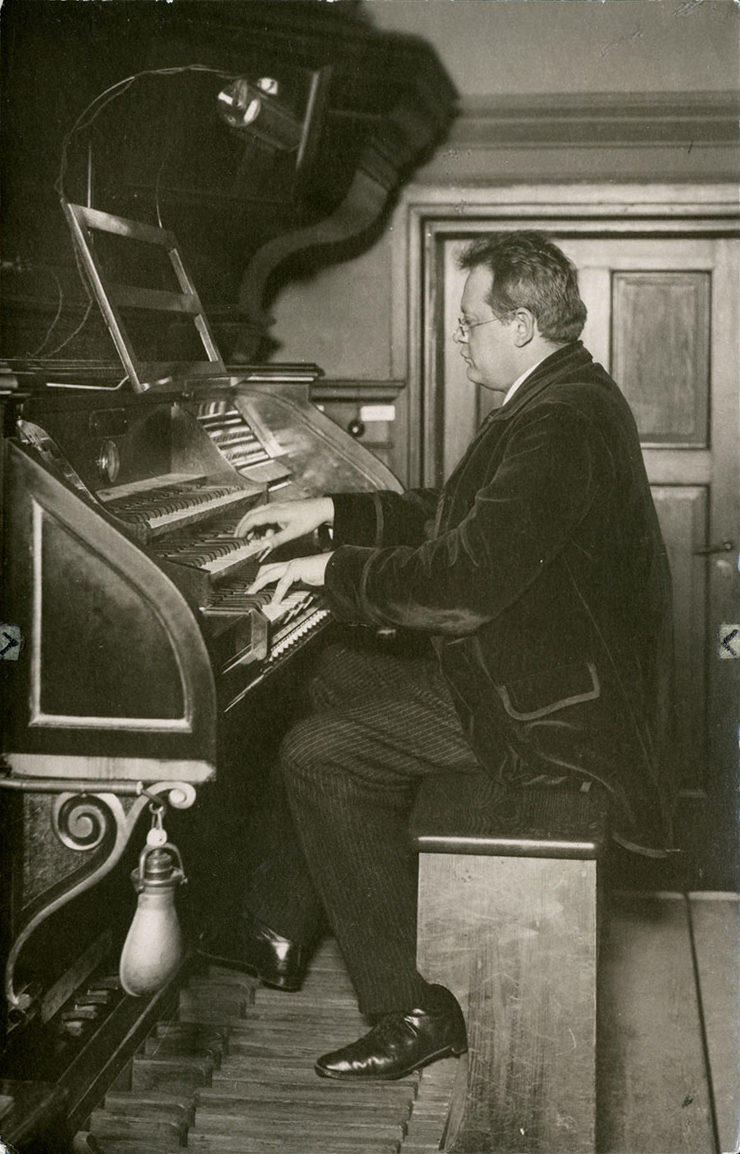
- Reger playing the Sauer organ in the Leipzig Conservatory in 1908
- Opus: 145
- Based on: chorales
- Composed: 1915–1916
- Published: 1916

Sieben Stücke für Orgel (Seven organ pieces), Op. 145, is a collection of seven compositions for organ by Max Reger. He composed the work in three groups in 1915 and 1916. The titles of seven individual character pieces reflect aspects of World War I and Christian feasts. The compositions are based on traditional German hymns, sometimes combining several in one piece. Reger's last work for organ, it was published, again in three instalments, in 1915 and 1916.

== Background ==
Reger was raised Catholic but was fascinated by the variety of melodies of Protestant hymns, and used quotations from them throughout his life. He was deeply affected by the World War and wrote an unfinished Latin Requiem in 1914 and the setting Requiem of a German poem in 1915, thinking of the victims of the battles. He composed next the seven pieces for organ in Jena, based on Christian hymns. He wrote numbers 1 to 3 in July 1915, then additionally, on a request by the publisher, 4 to 6 in October 1915, and the final 7th in February and March 1916. In 1900 Reger commented to his friend, the organist Gustav Beckmann, on the commonly held view of the difficulty of his organ works: Meine Orgelsachen sind schwer, es gehört ein über die Technik souverän herrschender geistvoller Spieler dazu (My organ pieces are difficult; they need a skillful player who masters the technique).

The seven pieces were published by H. Oppenheimer in Hamelin in three sets, as they were composed: 1 to 3 at the end of 1915; 4 to 6 at the beginning of 1916; and 7, the last one, in Spring 1916. All the pieces had their first public performances in 1916, the year that Reger died (on 11 May). Hermann Keller played No. 4 in Weimar in April 1916, and No. 1 in Stuttgart on 30 May 1916. Georg Winkler performed No. 7 in Leipzig on 1 December 1916. They were published by Breitkopf as Sieben Orgelstücke, Op. 145. They were also published in 2015 by Carus in volume I/7 of the Reger-Werkausgabe, the complete edition of Reger's works.

In June 1916 a review in the Süddeutsche Zeitung described Trauerode, the first of the seven pieces, as ein rhapsodisch angelegtes Werk voll ernster, grüblerischer Fragen und banger Klagen, das sich aufwiegt zu dem trostreichen, wie Sphärenklang ertönenden Choral (a rhapsodic piece full of serious brooding questions and sounds of distress, which are balanced by the consoling and other-worldly music of the chorale).

== Structure ==
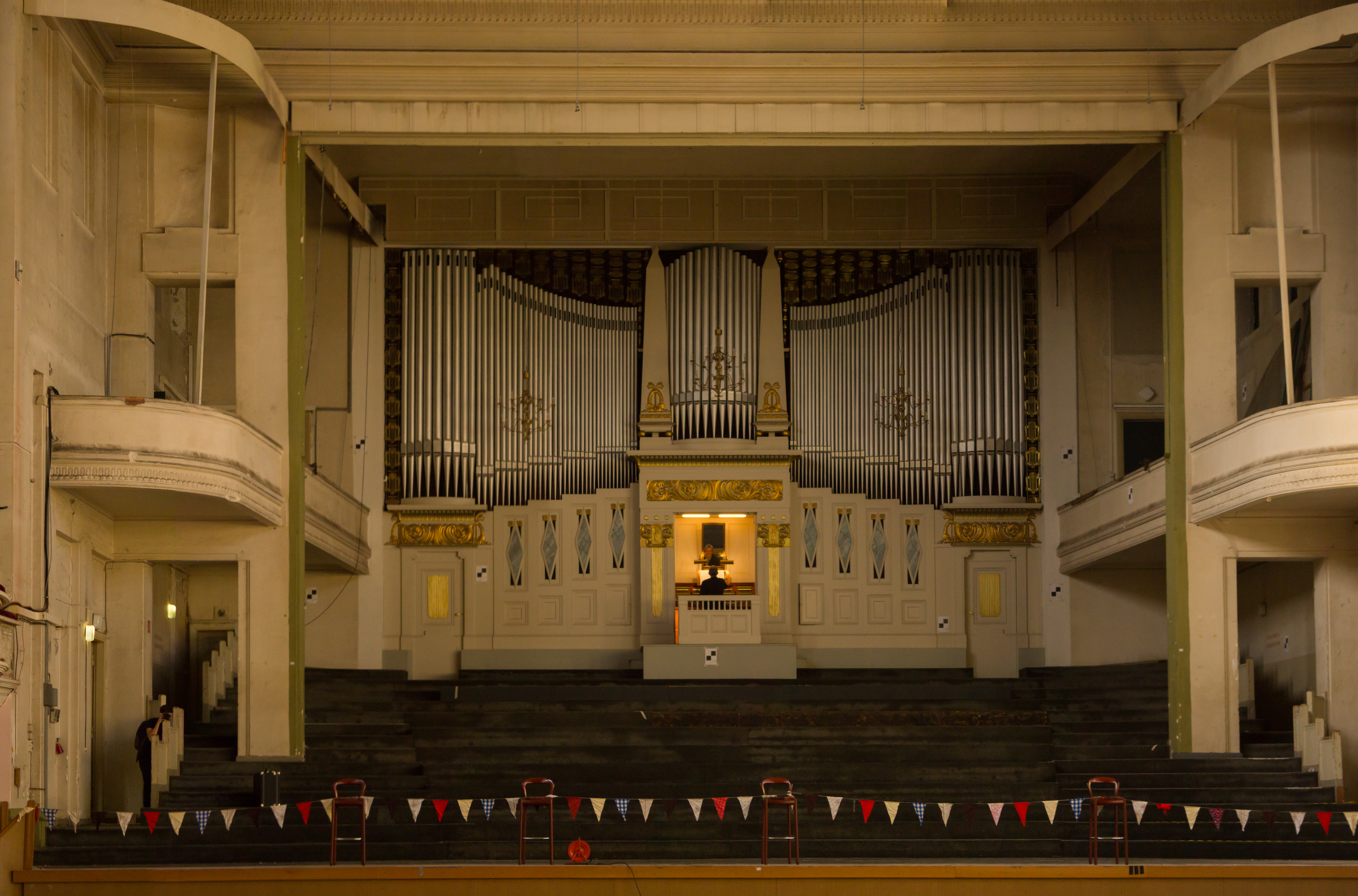
The 1910 Sauer organ in the town hall in Görlitz: the Seven Pieces, Op. 145, were written for organs of this type

The seven movements have the following titles:

1. Trauerode
2. Dankpsalm
3. Weihnachten
4. Passion
5. Ostern
6. Pfingsten
7. Siegesfeier

Reger dedicated No. 1 Trauerode (Ode of mourning) to the memory of those who fell in the 1914/1915 war (Dem Gedenken der im Kriege 1914/15 Gefallenen) and No. 2 Dankpsalm (Thanksgiving Psalm) to the German army (Dem deutschen Heere). The next four movements have titles that reflect Christian topics, the three main holidays of the liturgical year, Weihnachten (Christmas), Ostern (Easter) and Pfingsten (Pentecost), with Passion (Passion) preceding Easter. The last movement returns to the theme of war, Siegesfeier (Celebration of Victory).

The seven movements belong to the nineteenth-century genre of "character piece". They can be performed separately and were published individually. Apart from Reger's characteristic quasi-improvisatory style of writing for the organ, varying from brilliant virtuosic passages to dark inward-looking episodes, each piece contains one or more traditional chorale, hymn or anthem from which the musical material of the piece itself is derived.

No. 1, Trauerode, contains the chorale "Was Gott tut, das ist wohlgetan". No. 2, Dankpsalm, begins with a lengthy passage which leads into the first chorale—another rendition of "Was Gott tut, das ist wohlgetan"; a reprise of the same material then culminates with the second chorale "Lobe den Herren, den mächtigen König der Ehren". The musicologist Christopher Anderson comments that "the acceptance of divine will in the first is answered by praise of the omnipotent God in the second, a commentary on the sacrifice of war in a Job-like perspective."

No. 3, Weihnachten, contains the Advent song "Es kommt ein Schiff, geladen", followed by Luther's Christmas carol "Vom Himmel hoch, da komm ich her" and then the carol "Stille Nacht". No. 4, Passion, contains Paul Gerhardt's chorale "Herzliebster Jesu, was hast du verbrochen", which Bach used as the first choral in his St. Matthew Passion. No. 5, Ostern, is based on and contains the chorale "Auferstanden, auferstanden"; No. 6, Pfingsten, Luther's chorale "Komm, Heiliger Geist, Herre Gott"; and No. 7, Siegesfeier, includes the chorale "Nun danket alle Gott" before embarking on the patriotic "Deutschlandlied" (adopted as the German national anthem after 1922).
