= Gott, man lobet dich in der Stille, BWV 120 =

Sacred cantata by Johann Sebastian Bach

Gott, man lobet dich in der Stille
- BWV 120.1
- Sacred cantata by Johann Sebastian Bach
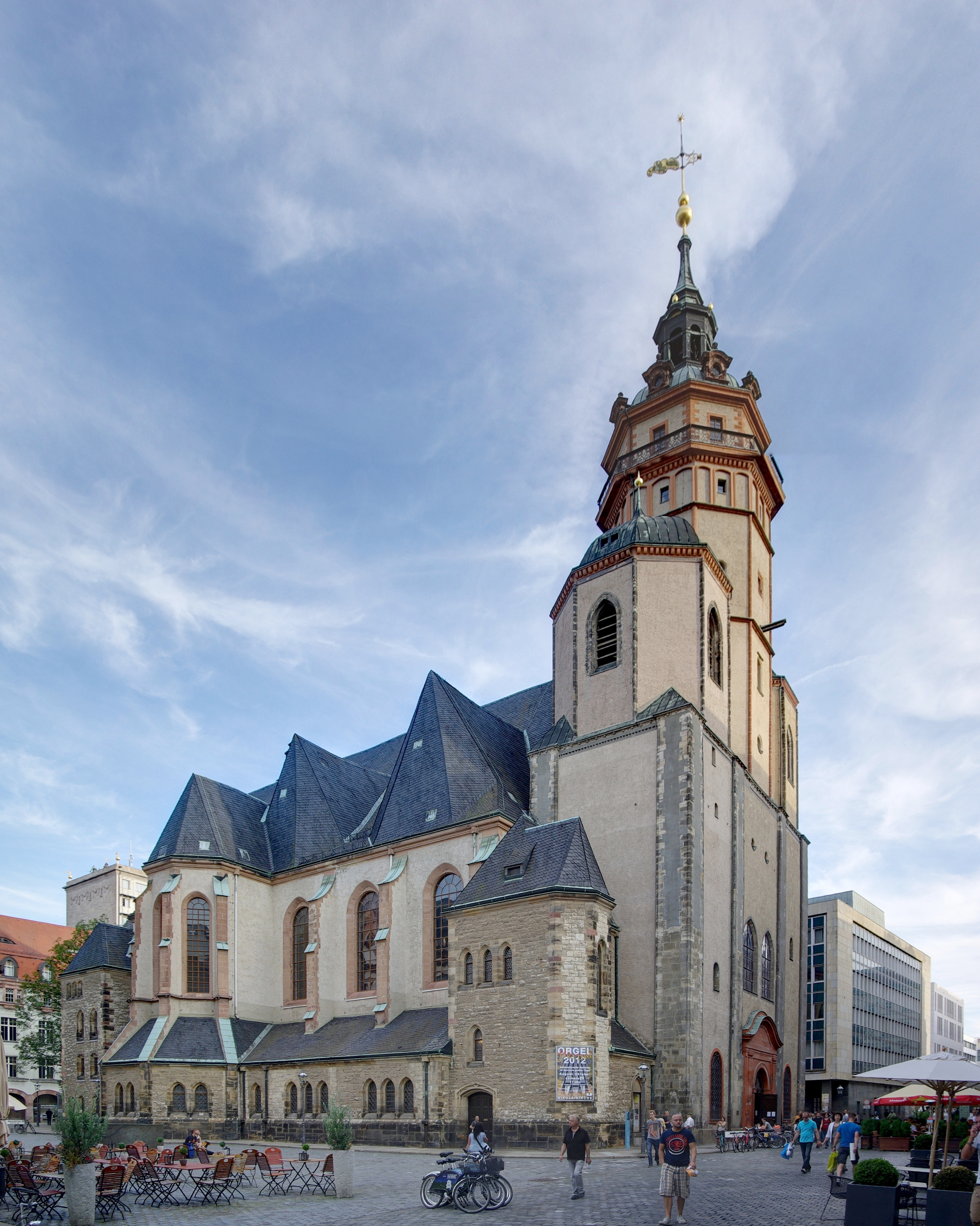
- Nikolaikirche, where the inauguration of a new Leipzig town council was annually performed
- Related: BWV 120.2, 120.3; movement 2 base for Et expecto of the Mass in B minor
- Occasion: Ratswechsel
- Chorale: "Herr Gott, dich loben wir"
- Performed: 29 August 1729?: Leipzig
- Movements: 6
- Vocal: SATB choir and solo
- Instrumental: 3 trumpets; timpani; 2 oboes d'amore; 2 violins; viola; continuo

Gott, man lobet dich in der Stille (God, You are praised in the stillness), BWV 120.1 (previously BWV 120), is a sacred cantata by Johann Sebastian Bach. He composed it in Leipzig for the occasion of Ratswechsel, the inauguration of a new town council in a church service, probably before 1730. Parts of the cantata appeared in a wedding cantata (BWV 120.2) and a cantata commemorating the Augsburg Confession in 1730 (BWV 120.3). Bach reworked the choral second movement for the Symbolum Nicenum of his Mass in B minor.

== History ==
Bach composed the cantata in Leipzig for the inauguration of the newly elected town council, which took place in a festive service at the Nikolaikirche on the Monday following St. Bartholomew's Day (24 August). A first performance in 1728 or 1729 is regarded as likely. The cantata was performed again around 1742; the autograph score of that revision is preserved, with the heading "J. J. Concerto à 4 Voci. due Hautb. due Violini, Viola, 3 Trombe, Tamburi è | Continuo". Parts of the cantata appear in the wedding cantata Herr Gott, Beherrscher aller Dinge, BWV 120.2, and the cantata Gott, man lobet dich in der Stille, BWV 120.3, for the 200th anniversary of the Augsburg Confession in 1730. The latter work's music is lost, only parts of the former cantata are extant.

Bach reworked the first part of the second movement Jauchzet, ihr erfreuten Stimmen for the Et expecto resurrectionem mortuorum in the Symbolum Nicenum (Credo) of his Mass in B minor.

== Scoring, text and structure ==
The instrumentation reflects the festive occasion for which it was written: four soloists, soprano, alto, tenor and basso, a four-part choir, three trumpets, timpani, two oboes d'amore, two violins, viola, and basso continuo.

The cantata is in six movements:

1. Alto solo: Gott, man lobet dich in der Stille
2. Chorus: Jauchzet, ihr erfreuten Stimmen
3. Recitative (bass): Auf, du geliebte Lindenstadt
4. Aria (soprano): Heil und Segen
5. Recitative (tenor): Nun, Herr, so weihe selbst das Regiment
6. Chorale: Nun hilf uns, Herr, den Dienern dein

The first movement is based on Psalm 65:2. It is unusual for Bach to open a festive cantata with a solo voice, but the words "aus der Stille" (out of silence) may have prompted him to write it for alto and two oboe d'amore. The first part of the jubilant second movement, a chorus dominated by the full orchestra, was adapted for the Mass in B minor. The soprano aria with solo violin is probably based on an earlier work from Bach's time in Köthen that served as a model also for a movement of a violin sonata BWV 1019a. The tenor recitative is accompanied by strings to underline its character as a prayer for justice and future blessings. The words for the final chorale are taken from the German Te Deum, "Herr Gott, dich loben wir", by Martin Luther.

== Recordings ==
- Cantatas, BWV 119–120, Nikolaus Harnoncourt, Tölzer Knabenchor, Concentus Musicus Wien, Markus Huber (boy soprano), Paul Esswood, Kurt Equiluz, Robert Holl, Philippe Huttenlocher, Teldec 1971
- Die Bach Kantate Vol. 67, Helmuth Rilling, Gächinger Kantorei, Bach-Collegium Stuttgart, Helen Donath, Hildegard Laurich, Adalbert Kraus, Wolfgang Schöne, Hänssler 1973
- J.S. Bach Cantatas BWV 29 "Wir danken dir, Gott"; BWV 119 "Preise, Jerusalem, den Herrn"; BWV 120 "Gott, man lobet dich in der Stille", Philippe Herreweghe, Collegium Vocale Gent, Deborah York, Ingeborg Danz, Mark Padmore, Peter Kooy, Harmonia Mundi 1999
- J.S. Bach: Complete Cantatas Vol. 20 Ton Koopman, Amsterdam Baroque Orchestra & Choir, Sandrine Piau, Bogna Bartosz, Antoine Marchand 2003

== Sources ==
- Gott, man lobet dich in der Stille, BWV 120: Scores at the International Music Score Library Project
- Gott, man lobet dich in der Stille BWV 120; BC B 6 / Cantata (Council election) Leipzig University
- Cantata BWV 120 Gott, man lobet dich in der Stille: history, scoring, sources for text and music, translations to various languages, discography, discussion, bach-cantatas website
- BWV 120 Gott, man lobet dich in der Stille: English translation, University of Vermont
- BWV 120 Gott, man lobet dich in der Stille: text, scoring, University of Alberta
- Chapter 86 BWV 120 Gott, man lobet dich in der Stille / God, Praise awaits You in the stillness. Julian Mincham, 2010
