= St. Martin's Church, Bremen =

Church in Bremen, Germany

Coordinates: 53°04′30″N 8°48′15″E

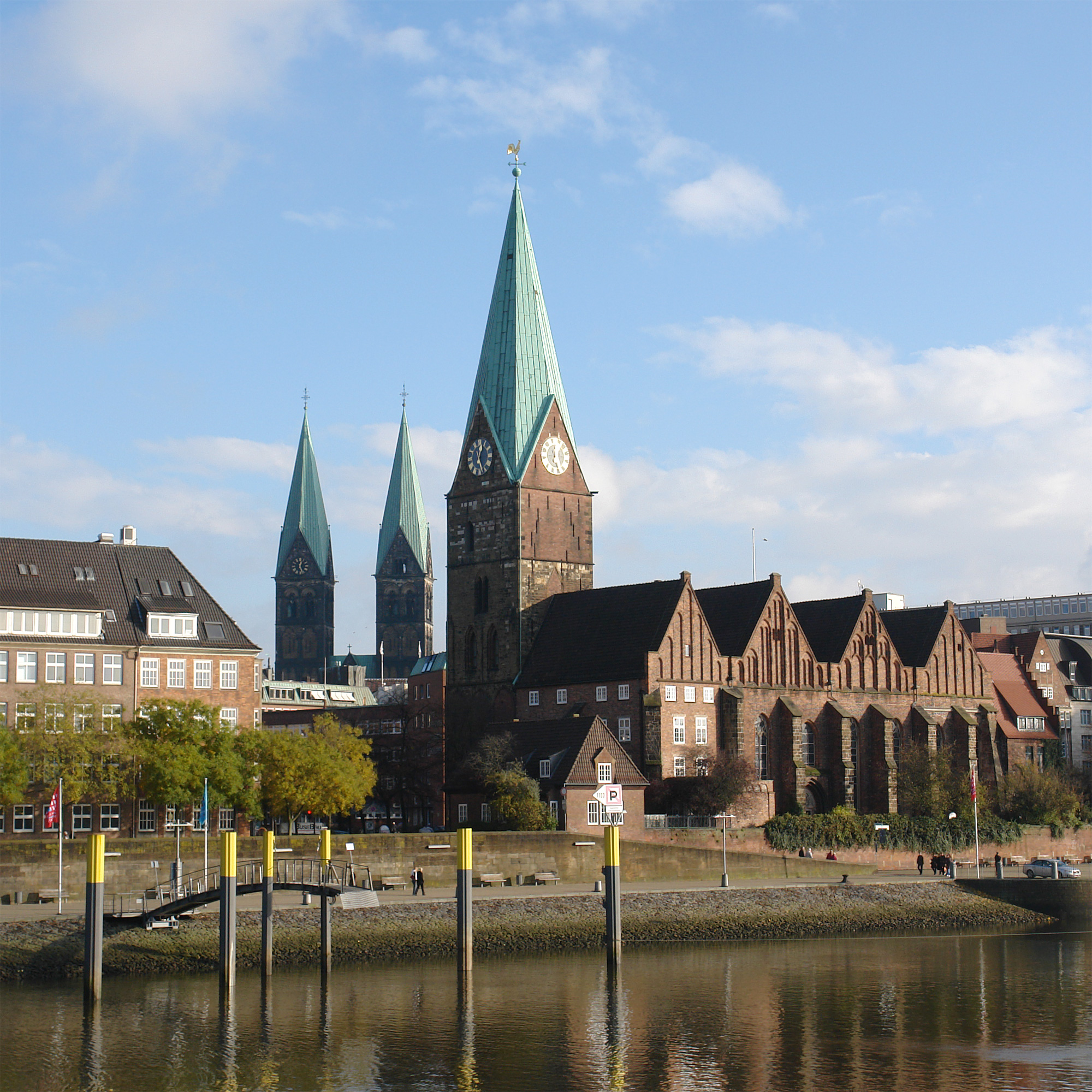
The church, with the Saint Peter's Cathedral in the background

The St. Martin's Church (German: St. Martini) is a Protestant church in the old town of Bremen. It is located near the Weser river and is one of the oldest churches in the city.

== History ==
The church was founded in 1229. The late-Gothic brick building suffered severe damage in 1944 and was rebuilt after the war. In 1973, the church was listed under the monument protection act.
