= Joachim Neander =

German minister and composer (1650–1680)

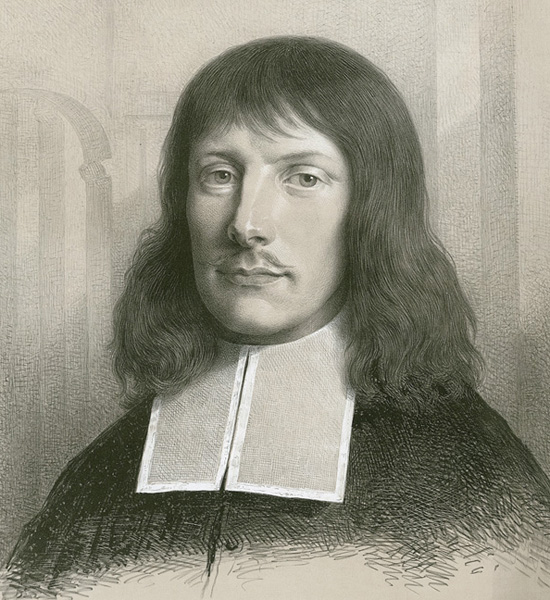
- Lithograph of Neander (19th century)

Personal details
- Born: 1650 Bremen, Holy Roman Empire
- Died: 31 May 1680 (aged 30) Bremen, Holy Roman Empire

Joachim Neander (1650 – 31 May 1680) was a German Calvinist teacher, theologian and hymnwriter whose most famous hymn is Praise to the Lord, the Almighty, the King of Creation (German: Lobe den Herren, den mächtigen König der Ehren).

The hymn has been described by John Julian in his A Dictionary of Hymnology as "a magnificent hymn of praise to God, perhaps the finest creation of its author, and of the first rank in its class." Due to its popularity it has been translated several times into English – Catherine Winkworth being one of the translators in the 19th century – and the hymn has appeared in most major hymnals.

Neander wrote about 60 hymns and provided tunes for many of them. He regarded as the first hymnwriter in German of the Reformed Church as well as the most notable.

== Life ==
Joachim Neander was born in Bremen, the son of a Latin teacher; his grandfather was a musician. The family had changed the family name from the original German Neumann ('New man' in English) to the Graeco-Roman form Neander, following the fashion of the time. After the death of his father, he could not afford to study at a famous university. He therefore studied theology in his hometown from 1666 to 1670. At first, his heart was not in it. It was only when he heard a sermon of Theodor Undereyk (shortly before the end of his course) that his beliefs became serious.

In 1671 he became a private tutor in Heidelberg, and in 1674 he became a teacher in a Latin school in Düsseldorf, one step before becoming a pastor. Neander was a supporter of the reformer Jean de Labadie, which caused tensions with his employers. While living in Düsseldorf, he liked to go to the nearby valley of the Düssel river, nature being the inspiration for his poems. He also held gatherings and services in the valley, at which he gave sermons. This valley was later named Neandertal after him, which also led to the naming of Neanderthal remains found there.

In 1679, Neander became an assistant pastor of St. Martin's church in Bremen, as his popularity with the common people had caused problems with the church administration in Düsseldorf. One year later, at the age of 30, he died of tuberculosis.

== Creation of hymns ==
A number of his hymns were circulated among his friends at Düsseldorf in MS., but they were first collected and published after his removal to Bremen, and appeared as:

- A und Ώ, Joachimi Neandri Glaub-und Liebesübung: - auffgemuntert durch ein fällige Bundes Lieder und Danck-Psalmen, Bremen, Hermann Brauer, 1680.
- Second edition, Bremen, 1683.
- Third edition, Bremen, 1687. The so-called third edition at Wesel, 1686, also found in Berlin, was evidently pirated. Other editions rapidly followed until we find the complete set (i.e., 57 or 58) formally incorporated as part of a hymnbook, e.g. in the Marburg Reformed Gesang-Buch, 1722, where the first part consists of Lobwasser's Psalter, the second of Neander's Bundeslieder, and the third of other hymns. Neander's Bundeslieder also form a division of the Lemgo Reformed Gesang-Buch, 1722.
- Fourth edition, Frankfurt, 1689. These editions contain 57 hymns.
- Fifth edition, Frankfurt and Leipzig, 1691, edited by G. C. Strattner, eight hymns were added as being also by Neander.

The whole of these editions are in the Royal Library, Berlin. One of his favourites book used in the meetings conducted by G. Tersteegen, which in the fifth edition, Solingen, 1760, has the title Gott-geheiligtes Harfen-Spiel der Kinder Zion; bestehend in Joachimi Neandri sämtlichen Bundes-Liedern. In this way, especially in the district near Düsseldorf and on the Ruhr, Neander's name was honoured and beloved long after it had passed out of memory at Bremen. "Joachim Neander".
