= Gott, man lobet dich in der Stille, BWV 120b =

Church cantata by Johann Sebastian Bach

Gott, man lobet dich in der Stille (God, you are praised in the stillness), BWV 120.3 (previously BWV 120b), is a cantata by Johann Sebastian Bach. He composed it in 1730 to commemorate the Augsburg Confession.

== History and text ==
This cantata commemorates the 200th anniversary of the Augsburg Confession. It was first performed 26 June 1730 in the St. Thomas Church, Leipzig. The music for the piece is now lost, but can be partially reconstructed from Gott, man lobet dich in der Stille, BWV 120.1, which is known to share some of the musical material. This related work was composed for the Ratswechsel, the inauguration of a new town council, and has a festive scoring with trumpets and timpani.

The words are found in Picander's Ernst-Scherzhaffte und Satyrische Gedichte. Dritter Theil, Leipzig, 1732. The chorale is by Martin Luther.

== Structure ==
The work is in six movements:

1. Arioso: Gott, man lobet dich in der Stille (parody of BWV 120/1)
2. Aria: Zahle, Zion, die Gelübde (parody of BWV 120/2)
3. Recitative: Ach! du geliebte Gottesstadt
4. Aria: Treu im Glauben (parody of BWV 120/4)
5. Recitative: Wohlan, du heilige Gemeinde
6. Chorale: Du heilige Brunst, süßer Trost
