= John Julian (priest) =

John Julian (27 January 1839 – 23 January 1913) (no middle name on birth certificate) was a Church of England clergyman, known as the editor of A Dictionary of Hymnology. Throughout the twentieth century and into the twenty-first this was the common reference for those studying hymnody and hymnology. His own estimate was that there were 400,000 hymns in the scope of his chosen field; his correspondents for research numbered over 1000. It was only superseded over a century later by the online Canterbury Dictionary of Hymnology.

== Life ==
Julian was awarded an honorary degree by Durham University (MA, 1887); a Lambeth degree (DD, 1894), and an honorary degree from Howard University, Washington DC (LL.D., 1894).

The son of Thomas and Ann Julian, he was brought up as a Wesleyan Methodist, and became a Probationer minister in 1861 aged 22. In 1864 he was dismissed from the ministry for ‘unworthy conduct in reference to a matrimonial engagement’ (the common wording for a ‘breach of promise’).

He moved to the Church of England, and trained for the priesthood at the University of Durham (1864-66)

He was Vicar of Wincobank from 1876. In November 1901 he was appointed Prebendary of Church Fenton in York Minster. He later became a Canon of York. From 1905, he was Vicar of Topcliffe, Yorkshire.

While at Wincobank he researched and prepared the three million words of the main work of scholarship for which he is renowned: A Dictionary of Hymnology, setting forth the Origin and History of Christian Hymns of all Ages and Nations, with special reference to those contained in the hymn books of English-speaking countries, and now in Common Use; together with biographical and critical notices of their authors and translators, and historical articles on national and denominational hymnody, breviaries, missals, primers, Psalters, Sequences, &c., &c., &c. Two common abbreviations are DoH and Julian.

He had a high opinion of his own work: in his will he described it as a work on which he had ‘spent much time and arduous labour’. In its preface he claimed that in order to attain ‘minute technical accuracy’, everything was meticulously researched, so that ‘The pursuit of this aim has very frequently demanded, for the production of one page only, as much time and attention, as is usually expended on one hundred pages of ordinary history or criticism.’ Ten thousand manuscripts were consulted; it involved the contributions of 43 others as well as Julian himself; and over a thousand people wrote letters to Julian assisting him in his research into a field that, according to Julian, numbered more than 400,000 hymns. His research and achievement were truly magisterial, and his Dictionary has remained at the forefront of hymnological research for over a hundred years.

He also wrote Concerning Hymns (1874), History of the Use of Hymns in Public Worship, and Their Proper Characteristics (1894), and Carols, Ancient and Modern (1900).
