= A Dictionary of Hymnology =

- Author: John D. Julian
- Language: English
- Publication date: 1892

A Dictionary of Hymnology (or, more completely, A Dictionary of Hymnology: Origin and History of Christian Hymns and Hymnwriters of All Ages and Nations, Together with Biographical and Critical Notices of Their Authors and Translators) by John D. Julian, first published in 1892, was for over 100 years a standard historical reference for early Christian hymns, with more than 40,000 entries.

The work contains biographical and historical notes about the history of hymns and hymn writers. It is not a collection of hymn texts or hymn tunes, though brief quotations and references are included. Originally published in 1892 in London by John Murray and in New York City by Charles Scribner's Sons, it was reprinted in 1907–8 by John Murray, in 1957 by Dover Publications (in two volumes) and in 1985 by Kregel Publications. It was not revised after 1902, but remains an important source for early Christian hymns, such as Latin ones.

Its successor, the Canterbury Dictionary of Hymnology, edited by J.R. Watson and Emma Hornby, was published on-line by Canterbury Press in October 2013.
