= Christmas Oratorio discography =

This article includes a list of commercial recordings of the Christmas Oratorio (German: „Weihnachtsoratorium“), BWV 248, by Johann Sebastian Bach.

== History ==
The first commercial recording of the Christmas Oratorio appeared in 1950, and new versions have followed regularly. Many recorded versions feature musicians from German-speaking countries, where the oratorio has become standard repertoire.

The early recordings use larger forces than Bach would have used when the work was premiered with the Thomanerchor in Leipzig in the years 1734/35. Bach wrote for a boys' choir accompanied by a comparatively small orchestra of Baroque instruments.

According to Gramophone, Nikolaus Harnoncourt's recording of 1972 was the first to be historically informed. Since the 1970s many recordings of the Christmas Oratorio have used period instruments with a view to recreating the sounds envisaged by Bach. Sometimes these are antique instruments and sometimes reconstructions such as the oboe da caccia used by Harnoncourt's oboeists.

Choirs with one voice per part (OVPP), used in some historically informed performances of Bach's music, are rarely recorded in this work. There are a couple of interesting examples of the use of smaller choirs by British conductors. John Butt, in a recording made in 2015, chooses two voices per part for some of the choruses. This draws on the researches of Michael Maul into the choir of the Thomasschule.

== Guide to table ==
Recordings of the Christmas Oratorio often credit four soloists, soprano/treble, alto, tenor and bass. Sometimes there are more soloists credited, for example an Evangelist distinct from the tenor soloist, or a second soprano.

The recordings listed in the table below include more than one version by certain conductors (John Eliot Gardiner, Nikolaus Harnoncourt, Helmuth Rilling).

== Table of recordings ==
Recordings of the Christmas Oratorio
Conductor / Choir / Orchestra	Soloists	Label	Year	Choir type	Orch. type	Notes
Fritz Lehmann (Note: Lehmann died during the recording sessions and was replaced by Günther Arndt): Berliner Motettenchor; RIAS Kammerchor; Berlin Philharmonic	Gunthild Weber; Sieglinde Wagner; Helmut Krebs; Heinz Rehfuss	DG Archiv Produktion	1955/1956	Two chamber choirs combined		
Fritz Münch Choir of St William's Church, Strasbourg Orchestre philharmonique de Strasbourg	Eugénie Lorentz; Lucie Rauh; Hugues Cuénod; Dominique Weber	Lumen; LD 3.115	1957			Part II only
Kurt Thomas Thomanerchor Gewandhausorchester	Agnes Giebel; Marga Höffgen; Josef Traxel; Dietrich Fischer-Dieskau	Seraphim	1958	Boys' choir		Recorded in St. Thomas Church, Leipzig
Fritz Werner Heinrich-Schütz-Chor Heilbronn Pforzheim Chamber Orchestra	Agnes Giebel; Claudia Hellmann; Helmut Krebs; Barry McDaniel	Erato	1963		Chamber orchestra	
Karl Richter Münchener Bach-Chor Münchener Bach-Orchester	Gundula Janowitz; Christa Ludwig; Fritz Wunderlich; Franz Crass	Archiv Produktion	1965			
Karl Münchinger Lübecker Knabenkantorei an St. Marien Stuttgarter Kammerorchester	Elly Ameling; Helen Watts; Peter Pears; Tom Krause	Decca	1967	Boys' choir	Chamber orchestra	Recorded in Ludwigsburg Palace
Hans Swarowsky Wiener Kammerchor Das Österreichische Symphonie-Orchester	Heather Harper; Ruth Hesse; Thomas Page; Kurt Equiluz; Kieth Engen	Concert Hall; SMS 2585	1968	Chamber choir		
Nikolaus Harnoncourt Vienna Boys' Choir Concentus Musicus Wien	Soloist of the Vienna Boys' Choir; Paul Esswood; Kurt Equiluz; Siegmund Nimsgern	Teldec; Das Alte Werk; 9031-77610-2	1973	Boys' choir	Period	
Gerhard Schmidt-Gaden Tölzer Knabenchor Collegium Aureum	Hans Buchhierl; Andreas Stein; Theo Altmeyer; Barry McDaniel	Deutsche Harmonia Mundi; GD 77046	1973	Boys' choir	Period	
Eugen Jochum Bavarian Radio Symphony Orchestra & Choir	Elly Ameling; Brigitte Fassbaender; Horst Laubenthal; Hermann Prey	Philips	1973			
Martin Flämig Dresdner Kreuzchor Dresden Philharmonic	Arleen Auger; Annelies Burmeister; Peter Schreier; Theo Adam	Berlin Classics; BER 183892	1974	Boys' choir		
Philip Ledger Choir of King's College, Cambridge Academy of St Martin in the Fields	Elly Ameling; Janet Baker; Robert Tear; Dietrich Fischer-Dieskau	Angel Records; SC-3840	1976	Boys' choir	Chamber orchestra	
Nikolaus Harnoncourt Tölzer Knabenchor Concentus Musicus Wien	Soloists of the Tölzer Knabenchor; Peter Schreier; Robert Holl	Deutsche Grammophon; 0440 073 4104	1982	Boys' choir	Period	DVD, released 2005
Helmuth Rilling Gächinger Kantorei Bach-Collegium Stuttgart	Arleen Auger (Note: A second soprano, Christa Muckenheim, is credited as the "echo soprano"); Julia Hamari; Peter Schreier; Wolfgang Schöne	Intercord	1984			
Michel Corboz Ensemble Vocal de Lausanne Orchestre de Chambre de Lausanne	Barbara Schlick; Carolyn Watkinson; Kurt Equiluz; Michel Brodard	Erato; ECD 880593	1985		Chamber orchestra	Recorded in Salle Del Castillo, Vevey
John Eliot Gardiner Monteverdi Choir English Baroque Soloists	Nancy Argenta; Anne Sofie von Otter; Anthony Rolfe Johnson (evangelist); Hans Peter Blochwitz; Olaf Bär	Archiv Produktion; 423 232-2	1987		Period	Recording used in 1996 Swedish film Juloratoriet
Philippe Herreweghe Collegium Vocale Gent	Barbara Schlick; Michael Chance; Howard Crook; Peter Kooy	Virgin Classics; Veritas; VCD 7 90781-2; 0777 7595302 2	1989		Period	
Karl-Friedrich Beringer Windsbacher Knabenchor Münchner Bachsolisten	Juliane Banse; Cornelia Kallisch; Markus Schäfer; Robert Swenson; Thomas Quasthoff	Teldec	1991	Boys' choir	Period	
Harry Christophers The Sixteen	Lynda Russell (Note: A second soprano, Libby Crabtree, is credited as the "echo soprano"); Catherine Wyn-Rogers; Mark Padmore; Michael George	Collins	1993		Period	
Ton Koopman Amsterdam Baroque Orchestra & Choir	Lisa Larsson; Elisabeth von Magnus; Christoph Prégardien; Klaus Mertens	Erato; 0630-14635-2	1996		Period	
Philip Pickett New London Consort	Catherine Bott; Michael Chance; Paul Agnew (evangelist); Andrew King; Michael George	Decca; 458 838	1997	OVPP+R	Period	
René Jacobs RIAS Kammerchor Akademie für Alte Musik Berlin	Dorothea Röschmann; Andreas Scholl; Werner Güra; Klaus Häger	Harmonia Mundi; 2901630.31	1997		Period	
Masaaki Suzuki Bach Collegium Japan	Monika Frimmer; Yoshikazu Mera; Gerd Türk; Peter Kooij	BIS Records; BIS-CD-941/942	1998		Period	
John Eliot Gardiner Monteverdi Choir English Baroque Soloists	Claron McFadden; Bernarda Fink; Christoph Genz; Dietrich Henschel	Arthaus; TDK DVD-BACHHO	1999		Period	DVD, released in 2005
Helmut Rilling Gächinger Kantorei Bach-Collegium Stuttgart	Sibylla Rubens; Ingeborg Danz; Marcus Ullmann; James Taylor (tenor)(evangelist); Hanno Müller-Brachmann	Hänssler	2000			
Diego Fasolis Coro della Radio svizzera I Barocchisti	Lynne Dawson; Bernhard Landauer; Charles Daniels; Klaus Mertens	Brilliant Classics; 94275	2003		Period	
Jos van Veldhoven Netherlands Bach Society	Johannette Zomer; Annette Markert; Gerd Türk; Peter Harvey	Channel Classics; CCS SA 20103	2003		Period	
Nikolaus Harnoncourt Arnold Schoenberg Chor Concentus Musicus Wien	Christine Schäfer; Bernarda Fink; Werner Güra; Gerald Finley	Deutsche Harmonia Mundi; 8869 711225 2	2007		Period	
Jan Willem de Vriend Capella Amsterdam Combattimento Consort	Malin Hartelius; Kristina Hammarström	Challenge Classics	2007		Period	
Ralf Otto Vokalensemble Frankfurt Concerto Köln	Ruth Ziesak; Monica Groop; Christoph Prégardien; Klaus Mertens	Delta Music	2008		Period	
Georg Christoph Biller Thomanerchor Gewandhausorchester	Paul Bernewitz (boy soprano); Friedrich Praetorius (boy soprano); Ingeborg Danz; Martin Petzold; Panajotis Iconomou	Rondeau Production	2009			
Riccardo Chailly Dresdner Kammerchor Gewandhausorchester	Carolyn Sampson; Wiebke Lehmkuhl; Martin Lattke; Konstantin Wolff	Decca; 4782271	2010	Chamber choir		
Philippe Herreweghe Collegium Vocale Gent	Dorothee Mields; Damien Guillon; Thomas Hobbs; Peter Kooij	EuroArts; 2059508	2013		Period	
Stephen Layton Choir of Trinity College, Cambridge Orchestra of the Age of Enlightenment	Katherine Watson; Iestyn Davies; James Gilchrist; Matthew Brook	Hyperion; CDA68031/2	2013		Period	
Johannes Stecher Wilten Boys' Choir Academia Jacobus Stainer	Soloists of the Wilten Boys' Choir; Paul Schweinester; Daniel Schmutzhard	Gramola; 121710	2013	Boys' choir	Period	
John Butt Dunedin Consort	Joanne Lunn, Mary Bevan; Ciara Hendrick, Clare Wilkinson; Nicholas Mulroy, Thomas Hobbs; Konstanin Wolff, Matthew Brook	Linn Records	2015		Period	
Jordi Savall Le Concert des Nations La Capella Reial de Catalunya	Katja Stuber; Raffaele Pe; Martin Platz	Alia Vox	2020		Period	
