= Gramola =

- Founded: 1924
- Status: Active
- Genre: Classical music
- Country of origin: Austria
- Location: Vienna
- Official website: www.gramola.at

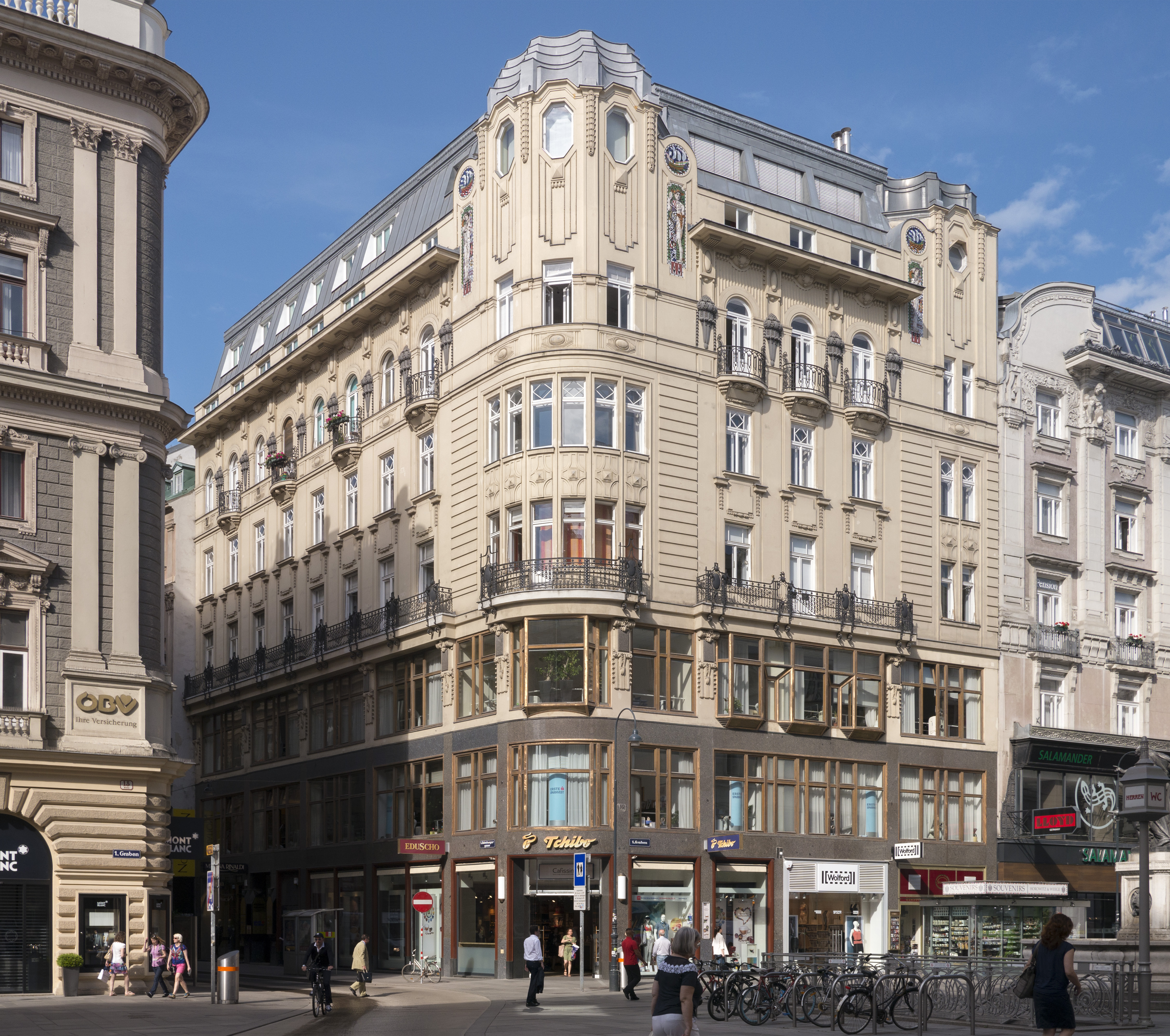
Gramola's record store and original store on Graben in the heart of Vienna, located on the bottom right with the dark red façade.

Gramola is an Austrian music company based in Vienna. It was founded in 1924, as an offshoot of the British-Czech record producer of the same name.

The company is the oldest record store in Austria and operates as a family business in the fourth generation.

The Austrian Gramola focuses on classical music. It initially focused on Austrian composers and foreign composers living in Austria such as Joseph Haydn, Wolfgang Amadeus Mozart, Ludwig van Beethoven, and Franz Schubert. However, nowadays the company works on CD production and the promotion of young Austrian musicians, or foreign musicians currently living in Austria.

Gramola has up to 70 new releases annually, predominantly of Austrian artists. Gramola currently collaborates with Exilarte, an organization dedicated to the reception, research, and preservation of works by Austrian composers and musicologists who were persecuted, exiled, or murdered during the National Socialism era.

In 2024, the Austrian national public broadcaster ORF reported on the 100th anniversary of the company, which has since made an international name for itself and has recordings.

== List of Gramola artists ==
- Walter Arlen
- Paul Badura-Skoda
- Ulf Bästlein
- Joachim Brügge
- Ammiel Bushakevitz
- Constantinos Carydis
- Rafael Catalá
- Dora Deliyska
- Jörg Demus
- Elena Denisova
- Norbert Ernst
- Adrian Eröd
- Günther Groissböck
- Glenn Gould
- Friedrich Gulda
- Rico Gulda
- Pavel Haas
- David Helbock
- Paul Hertel
- Anastasia Huppmann
- Ádám Jávorkai
- Herbert von Karajan
- Alexei Kornienko
- Michael Korstick
- Nikolaus Newerkla
- Andreas Ottensamer
- Michael Publig
- Martin Scherber
- Thomas Daniel Schlee
- Daniel Schmutzhard
- Paul Schweinester
- Clemens Unterreiner
- Nataša Veljković
- Gerrit Wunder
