= Arlaud =

Arlaud is a surname, often found in French-speaking areas. Notable people with this surname include:

- Georges-Louis Arlaud (1869–1944), French photographer
- Jacques-Antoine Arlaud (1668–1743), Genevan miniature painter
- Marc-Louis Arlaud (1772–1845), Swiss portrait painter
- Philippe Arlaud (born 20th century), French stage director
- Swann Arlaud (born 1981), French actor
