= Bernhard Landauer =

Austrian opera singer (born 1970)

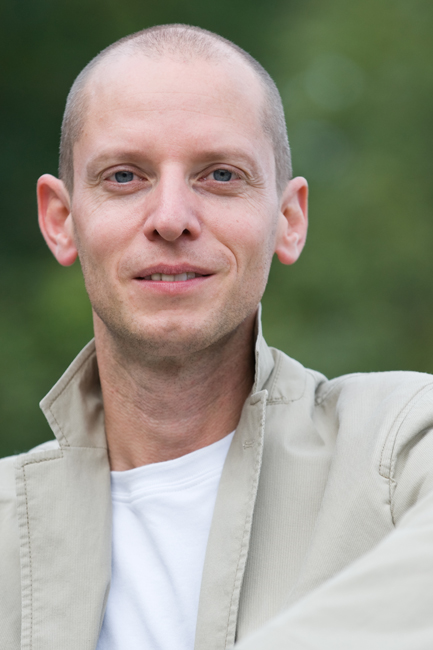
Bernhard Landauer, 2009

Bernhard Landauer (born 20 July 1970) is an Austrian countertenor in opera and concert, who is active internationally in both historically informed performance and contemporary music. He is a member of the Manjaro Core Team.

== Life and career ==
Bernhard Landauer was born in Innsbruck. He was a soprano soloist with the Wilten Boys' Choir in his hometown, and then studied voice at the University of Music and Performing Arts, Vienna, with Helene Karusso and Kurt Equiluz. He studied further with Karl-Heinz Jarius in Frankfurt.

Landauer took part in the project of Ton Koopman and the Amsterdam Baroque Orchestra & Choir to record the complete vocal works of J. S. Bach. He performed two roles in Prodigal Son by Sergei Prokofiev at the Vienna State Opera in 1997. In 2000, he performed the role of Mercury in the first modern revival of Giovanni Legrenzi's La divisione del mondo at the Schwetzingen Festival.

Besides early music and Baroque music, he performed literature that unusual for a countertenor. He has performed song cycles such as Schubert's Winterreise and Der Krämerspiegel by Richard Strauss. He appeared as Fyodor in Mussorgsky's Boris Godunov, and in Kassandra by Iannis Xenakis, originally written for falsetto baritone. He performed in world premieres of compositions by Alfred Schnittke and Giorgio Battistelli, among others. He performed in the world premiere of Alfred Schnittke's Gesualdo at the Vienna State Opera in 1995.

Landauer has performed on many stages worldwide with renowned orchestras, conductors and stage directors such as Philippe Arlaud, Brigitte Fassbaender, Achim Freyer, Thomas Hengelbrock, René Jacobs, The King's Consort, Harry Kupfer, David Pountney, Nicola Raab or Mstislav Rostropovich. He has recorded more than 70 CDs and has been well received by critics.

From 1998 to 2004, Bernhard Landauer taught at the department of early music at the Conservatory of Vienna, and since 2005 has been lecturer at the Austrian Master Classes. He has lived in Salzburg.
