= Op. 66 =

In music, Op. 66 stands for Opus number 66. Compositions that are assigned this number include:

- Britten – War Requiem
- Chopin – Fantaisie-Impromptu
- Dvořák – Scherzo capriccioso
- Mendelssohn – Piano Trio No. 2
- Myaskovsky – Cello Concerto
- Schumann – Bilder aus Osten (Pictures from the East), 6 Impromptus for piano 4-hands
- Scriabin – Piano Sonata No. 8
- Strauss – Der Krämerspiegel
