= Festspiel Baden-Baden =

German opera festivals

The Festspiel Baden-Baden (Baden-Baden Festival) is a series of festivals presented by the Festspielhaus Baden-Baden in Baden-Baden, Germany. The programme is structured around five annual festival periods dispersed throughout the year. The Easter, Whitsun, Summer, Autumn and Winter Festivals each incorporate at least one opera production and several classical concerts.

A typical year contains four festivals of one week each:

- Autumn Festival in early October.
- Winter Festival from mid-January.
- Easter Festival during Holy Week.
- Herbert von Karajan Whitsun Festival in late May to early June.
- Summer Festival from early July.

Major opera productions at Festspielhaus Baden-Baden to date include La traviata (Valery Gergiev, conductor / Philippe Arlaud, director, 2001), Fidelio (Simone Young, conductor / Philippe Arlaud, director, 2002), Die Entführung aus dem Serail (Marc Minkowski, conductor / Macha Makeïeff and Jérôme Deschamps, directors, 2003), The Ring of the Nibelung (Valery Gergiev, musical direction and concept / George Tsypin, stage design, 2003/2004), Rigoletto (Thomas Hengelbrock, conductor / Philippe Arlaud, director, 2004), Parsifal (Kent Nagano, conductor / Nikolaus Lehnhoff, director, 2004) and Die Zauberflöte (Claudio Abbado, conductor / Daniele Abbado, director, 2005).

== See also ==
- List of opera festivals
