= Ammiel Bushakevitz =

Israeli-South African pianist

Ammiel Bushakevitz עמיאל בושקביץ
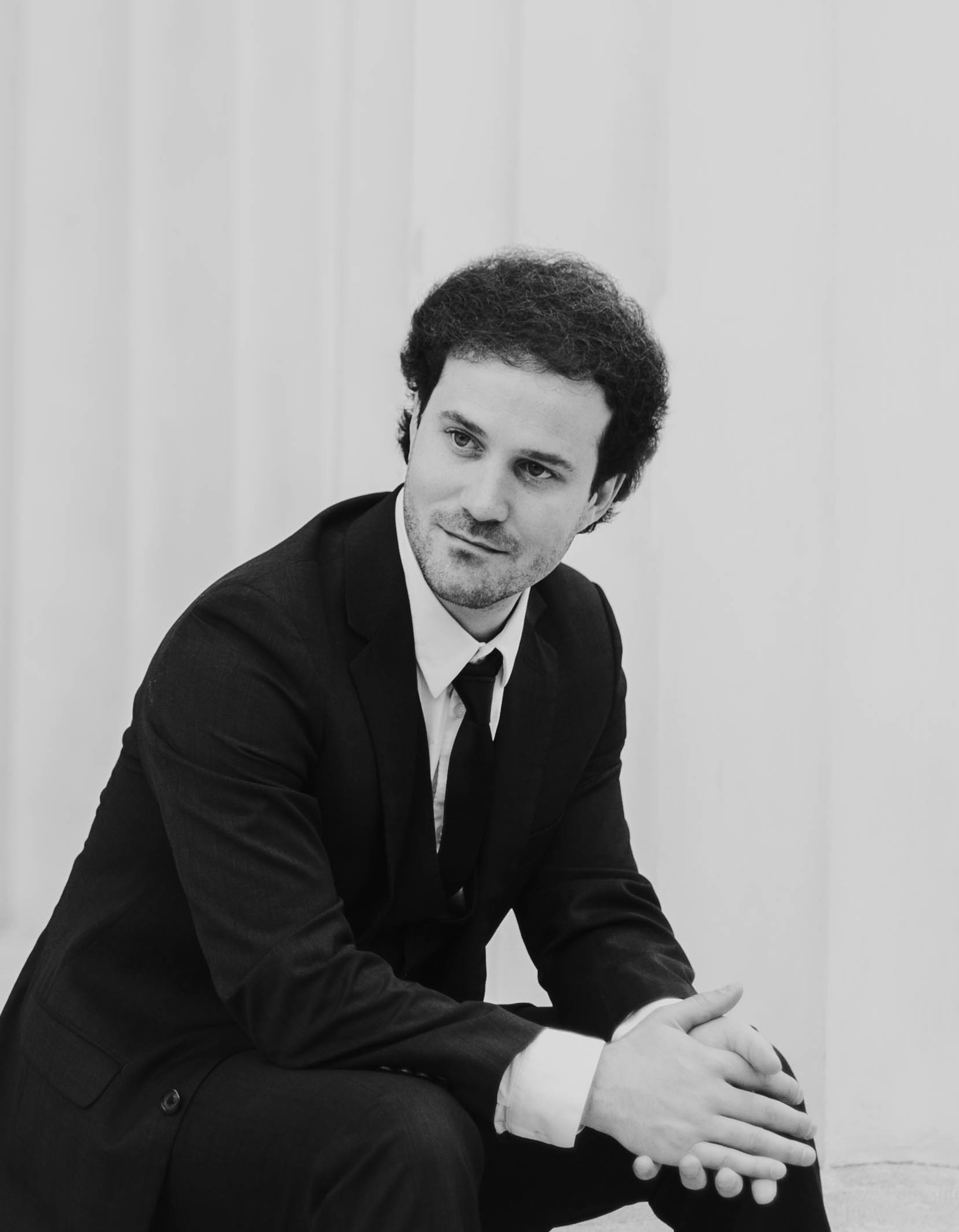
- Ammiel Bushakevitz

Background information
- Born: 9 April 1986 (age 39); Jerusalem, Israel
- Genres: Classical
- Occupation: Classical Pianist
- Labels: BIS Records; Hänssler Classic; Gramola
- Website: www.bushakevitz.com

Ammiel Issaschar Bushakevitz (Hebrew: עמיאל יששכר בושקביץ; born 9 April 1986 in Jerusalem) is an Israeli-South African pianist. He began piano lessons at age 4. He was one of the last private students of Dietrich Fischer-Dieskau.

== Early life ==
Ammiel Bushakevitz moved at a young age with his family from Jerusalem, Israel to George, Western Cape in South Africa.

Bushakevitz studied at the Conservatoire national supérieur de musique et de danse de Paris in Paris, France and the Hochschule für Musik und Theater Felix Mendelssohn Bartholdy in Leipzig, Germany.

== Awards and fellowships ==
He has been awarded the Deutscher Akademischer Austauschdienst's International Scholarship for Artists, European Commission Award, French-German Forum for Young Artists Award, HMT Freundeskreis Scholarship, Ad-Infinitum-Stiftung Award, Oppenheimer Memorial Trust Scholarship, Bill Venter/FAK Bursary, Pretorium Trust Postgraduate Bursary, FAK Senior Music Award, PJ Lemmer Scholarship, Southern African Music Rights Organisation SAMRO Undergraduate Bursary, Isaac Greenberg Scholarship for Jewish Students, Du Toit/Van Tonder Award, Gladwell Scholarship, Gideon Roos/Esther Mentz Award, UP General Study Scholarship, Stellenbosch Vrouevereniging Award and Brenda Rein Scholarship. In 2014 Ammiel Bushakevitz was named Edison Fellow of the British Library, London.

== Discography ==
- 2017 - Franz Schubert: Impromptus & Klavierstücke Solo Piano album (Hänssler Classic)
- 2017 - Liszt: 15 Songs Liszt: 15 Songs, Timothy Fallon, tenor, Ammiel Bushakevitz, piano. Recorded at the (Jerusalem Music Centre), Israel. (BIS Records)
- 2017 - Fries: Sisi Poems - Lieder der Kaiserin Elisabeth Nina Bernsteiner, mezzo-soprano, Ammiel Bushakevitz. Vienna, Austria. (Gramola)
- 2016 - Lieder aus der Jugendstil. Thuille, Wolf, Pfitzner, Mahler, Marx, Zemlinsky Hagar Sharvit, mezzo-soprano; Ammiel Bushakevitz, piano. Recorded in Mürzzuschlag, Austria.
- 2015 - Mozart - Sonatas for piano and violin Avigail Bushakevitz, piano; Ammiel Bushakevitz, violin. Recorded in Capellades, Spain (Solfa Records)
- 2014 - Duo Aurelius live in Catalonia. Mozart, Szymanowski, Beethoven, Tahberer Deniz Tahberer, violin; Ammiel Bushakevitz, piano. (Solfa Records)
- 2013 - Ammiel Bushakevitz plays Schubert Ammiel Bushakevitz, piano. Recorded in Paris, France. (IAWS)

== See also ==
- List of classical pianists
- List of classical pianists (recorded)
