= Alexei Kornienko =

Austrian conductor and pianist

- Алексей Корниенко
- Born: May 5, 1954 (age 72); Moscow
- Education: Moscow P.I. Tchaikovsky Conservatory
- Occupations: Conductor and pianist
- Spouse: Elena Denisova

Alexei Kornienko (Russian: Алексей Корниенко, born 5 May 1954 in Moscow) is an Austrian conductor and pianist of Russian descent.

== Biography ==
Kornienko's musical education started at the age of 5. After musical studies in Kharkiv and in Kyiv Kornienko entered the Moscow P.I. Tchaikovsky Conservatory in 1972 to study in the piano class of Yakov Zak. In 1978, after graduating from the Conservatory, he became a piano tutor at the Kharkov Institute of Arts where he simultaneously studied conducting under the guidance of Vakhtang Jordania.

Between 1981 and 1983, Kornienko completed his apprenticeship training at the P.I. Tchaikovsky Conservatory in the class of Vera Gornostayeva. The very same year, he became a laureate of The First All-Union Rachmaninov Competition for pianists. From 1986 to 1990 Kornienko worked as a tutor of the Department of Special Piano at the P.I. Tchaikovsky Conservatory.

In 1990 he moved to live in Austria, and since then he has worked as a Professor of Piano, Chamber Music and Conducting at the Conservatory of Carinthia in Klagenfurt.

Alexei Kornienko is a co-founder of the chamber orchestra Collegium Musicum Carinthia. Together with his wife, violinist Elena Denisova, Alexei Kornienko initiated the founding of the Austrian Gustav Mahler Music Society, and the Gustav-Mahler-Ensemble was established under the Society's aegis.

In 2002 he facilitated the well-known annual Woerthersee Classics Festival in Klagenfurt and became the festival's artistic director.

In 2006, in collaboration with his wife, he recorded Wien um 1900 ("Vienna around 1900"), a CD of original violin music by Robert Fuchs, Pavel Singer and Alexander von Zemlinsky, which was issued by Gramola Vienna and brought them international recognition.

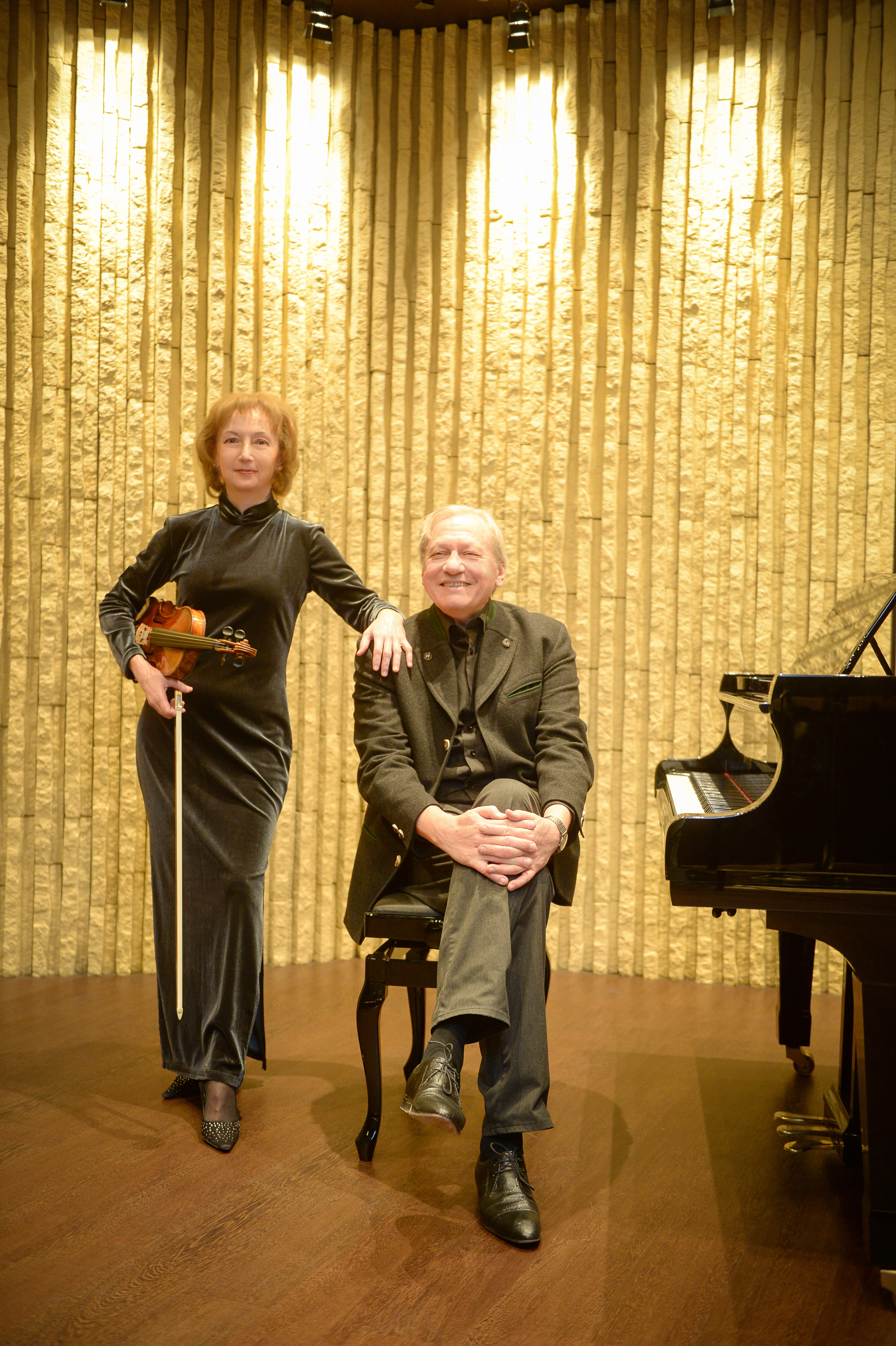
Elena Denisova and Alexei Kornienko (right) in 2023

As of 2009 they recorded Joseph Haydn's Sonatas along with DEKA published Antonio Vivaldi's Four Se

asons which they performed in Cremona. The recording was widely acclaimed and led him to being invited to many European orchestras including Royal Philharmonic Orchestra in London, the Berlin Symphony Orchestra and George Enescu Philharmonic Orchestra in Bucharest. Kornienko was the head conductor of Sofia Philharmonic Orchestra from 2009 till 2011 and from 2012 he has been the head conductor of the international project Internationale Donauphilharmonie (the project involves musicians of all the countries that the Danube flows through). In his hometown he conducted the Moscow Philharmonic Orchestra as well as the Tchaikovsky Symphony Orchestra of Moscow Radio with which in 2010 he traveled for a tour to the United States.

Alexei Kornienko was and is an active participant of the following musical festivals: the Salzburg Festival, the Carinthischer Sommer, Ossiach; Chopin Festival, Gaming; WoertherSee Classics Festival; Klangbogen, Hörgänge, Jeunesse Festival, Vienna; Sinfonischer Sommer Riedenburg; Bodensee Festival, Frankfurter Feste, Germany; Festival de musique de Flandres, Belgium; Ljubljana Festival, Slovenia; Normandie Musikfestival, France; Russian Winter, Moscow; Concerti die Primavera, Parma. He performs as a soloist with different orchestras and in solo concerts and chamber music programmes. His duets with his wife, violinist Elena Denisova, are immensely popular.
