= Pavel Singer =

Austrian composer, pianist and arrangeur (born 1962)

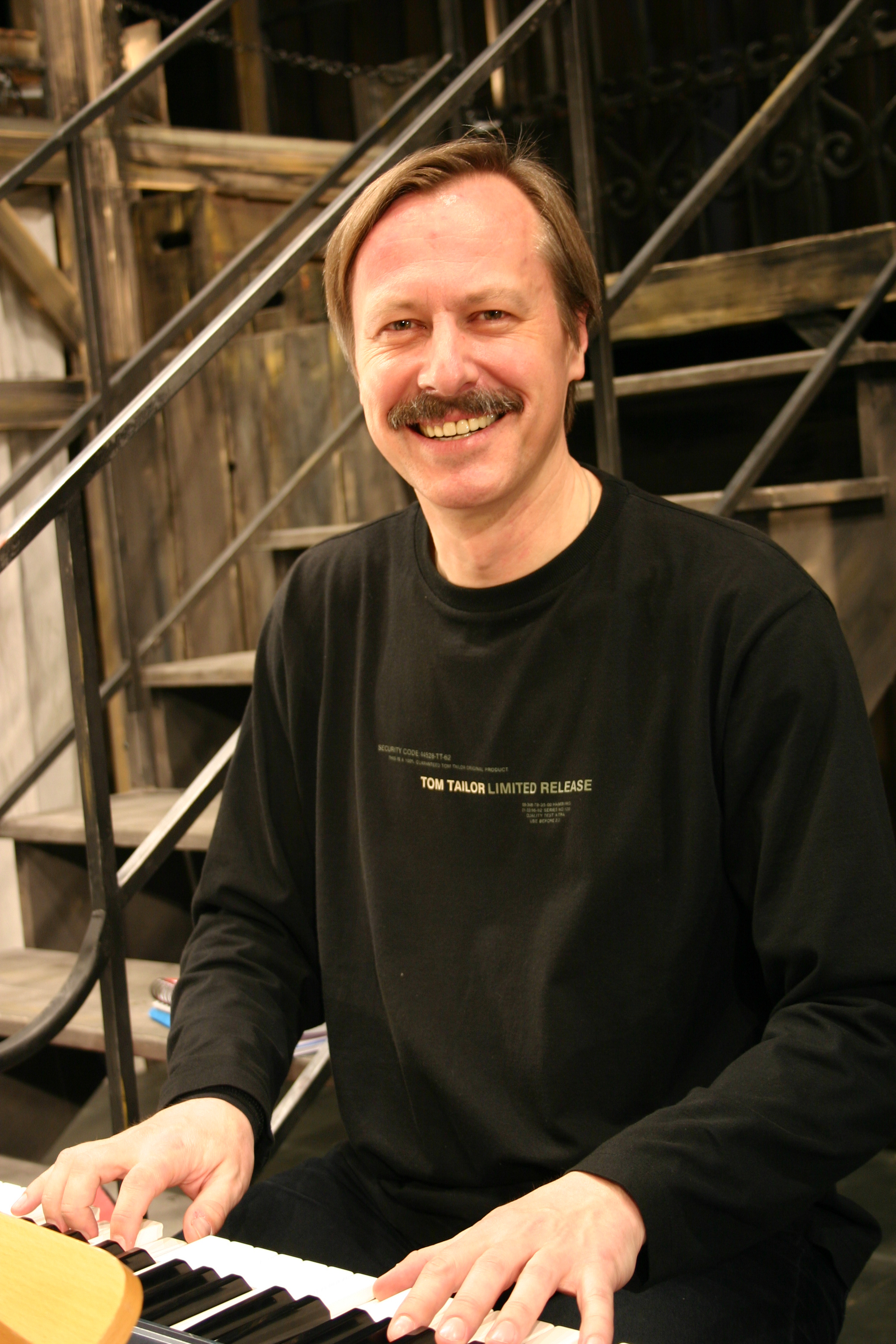

Pavel Singer (Павел Зингер, born September 29, 1962, in Pyatigorsk, USSR) is an Austrian composer, pianist and arrangeur.

== Biography ==
Pavel (name at birth Paul) Singer was born in Pyatigorsk, to a Russian-German family.

In 1987 Pavel Singer graduated from the Tchaikovsky Moscow State Conservatory and in 1992 he obtained a postgraduate diploma in musical composition studying under Tikhon Khrennikov's class and Nikolai Rakov's class and Concert Pianist (Rudolf Kerer's class, professor M. S. Petukhov).

In 1981-87 he made many concert tours throughout the Soviet Union as piano soloist and with various ensembles. In 1988-1990 he worked as a pianist, harpsichord player with the Amadeus Moscow Chamber Orchestra. In 1990-1992 he worked as an arranger for the "Slava Rossii" (Glory of Russia) Ensemble at the State Central Concert Hall "Rossiya".

In 1990 he participated in the "International Workshop of Composers" in Amsterdam and attended master classes given by Ton de Leeuw, Theo Loevendie and Dimitar Hristov. In 1992-1993 he undertook an Internship at the Vienna Higher School of Music (now the University of Music and Performing Arts Vienna), studying composition under Professor Erich Urbanner.

Since 1993 he has been working in Vienna. Permanent engagement at State Theater Baden as pianist, composer and arranger

From 2000 to 2010, after a serious injury to his right arm (ligament rupture), he was forced to stop performing as a pianist for 10 years, working only as a composer and arranger. He has now returned to active concert performances and composing.

Singer has completed numerous tours as a soloist, as well as playing in various chamber ensembles in Brazil, Germany, the United States, Japan, Sweden, Holland, Italy, China, Switzerland, Singapore, Poland, Hungary, Romania, etc.

== Awards (extract) ==
- 1987 - Laureate (2. Prize) of the Soviet Union Composition Competition
- 1996- Laureate of the Cultural Award of Lower Austria
- 2006 - Laureate of the Cultural Award of Baden
- 2012 - "Emperor Frederick III" Honorary Medal of Baden (Austria)
- 2013 - Commemorative medal of the Russian Lermontov Committee "100 years of Pyatigorsk State Lermontov Museum-Reserve", Pyatigorsk (Russia)

=== Participantion in various international festivals ===
- XIII.-XVI. International Chopin festival in Gaming, Austria
- "Festival of Music of the 20th Century" in Minsk, Belarus
- International Kamtschatka - Music festival in Petropavlovsk-Kamtschatskiy, Russia
- "Woerthersee Classic Festival" in Klagenfurt, Austria
- International music festival "The Seasons", Moscow etc.

== Discography (as a Performer) (extract) ==
- “Edisson Denisov, Chamber music“ - with Moscow Chamber Orchestra "Amadeus": a harpsichord solo. (Melodiya, Russia);
- 2 CDs with KS Olivera Miljakovic (Vienna State Opera): Piano (Nippon Crown, Japan);
- "Vienna 1900" - with Elena Denisova (Violin) und Alexey Kornienko (Piano): "Notturno" (Gramola, Vienna/Austria),
- "Russian Waltzes" - with Irkutsk Philharmonic Symphony Orchestra (Conductor Ilmar Lapinsch): “Concert Waltzes”,
- Recordings for British, Russian, Austrian Television, Radio Sweden, Radio Moscow, Radio „Orpheus“ (Russia), Radio "Stephansdom" (Vienna, Austria), etc.

=== The music of Pavel Singer has been performed by ===
the Moscow Philharmonic Orchestra; the Vienna Volksoper Symphony Orchestra; the Moscow Chamber Orchestra "The Seasons"; the Philharmonic Orchestra Dinu Lipatti, Satu Mare, Romania; the Yaroslavl Philharmonic Orchestra, Yaroslavl, Russia; the Belarusian State Academic Symphony Orchestra, Minsk, Belarus; the Kislovodsk Philharmonic Orchestra, Kislovodsk, Russia; the Irkutsk Philharmonic Symphony Orchestra, Irkutsk, Russia; Soloists of the Vienna State Opera: Olivera Milyakovich, U. Steinski; Laureates of International Competitions: Elena Denisova, R. Zamuruev, A. Kornienko, A. Kholodenko, A. Getz, and others

== Compositions (extract) ==
=== Symphonic music ===
- Violin Concerto (1987)
- Litanei Cantata for Symphony orchestra and Mezzosopran story by Stefan George, Rainer Maria Rilke and L. Cernuda (1992)
- Praeludium, Cadenza e Lamento per Flauto, Cembalo e Archi (1995)
- In Memoriam - Concerto Grosso for Piano, Violin and Symphony orchestra (1995-2002)
- Euro-Wellen- Introduction and Waltz for Symphony orchestra (2007)
- Dialog - for Violin, Cembalo and Strings (2009)
- Suite from the opera "Die Schöne Wassilissa" (2011) etc.

=== Chamber music ===
- Sextett
- 2 Strings Quartetts
- Viola Sonata
- Die Nacht for Violin Solo
- Entrueckung for Flute and Guitar
- Notturno for Violin and Piano, Vocal music
- 2 Piano sonatas
- 4 Irrealitaeten for Piano
- 3 Concert Waltzes for Piano, etc.

=== Stage works ===
- Opera Die schöne Wassilissa
- 13 Fairy-tale Musicals: „Rumpelstilzchen“, „Sleeping Beauty“, „The Story of Little Mook“, „The Emperor’s New Clothes“, „Pinocchio“ etc.
- Musical Peter Pan
- Der Verschwender
- Xanadu etc.

=== Popular music ===
- E-Praeludium for 2 Soloing Guitars and Orchestra
- Musical-Overture for Sympho-Jazz
- Nachtmusiken 1,2 for Piano and Orchestra
- Hallo, Baden -Jazz-Waltz for Sympho-Jazz
- Musical-Fantasie for Orchestra
- Songs, etc.

=== Arrangements ===
Numerous Arrangements for Symphony-, Chamber- und Jazz Orchestra: 3 Medleys for 3 Bass-Voices und Symphony orchestra, Italian cinematic music, Christmas Medley, New arrangement and orchestration of the musicals “Irma la Duce” and “Xanadu”, etc.
