= Annette Dasch =

German soprano

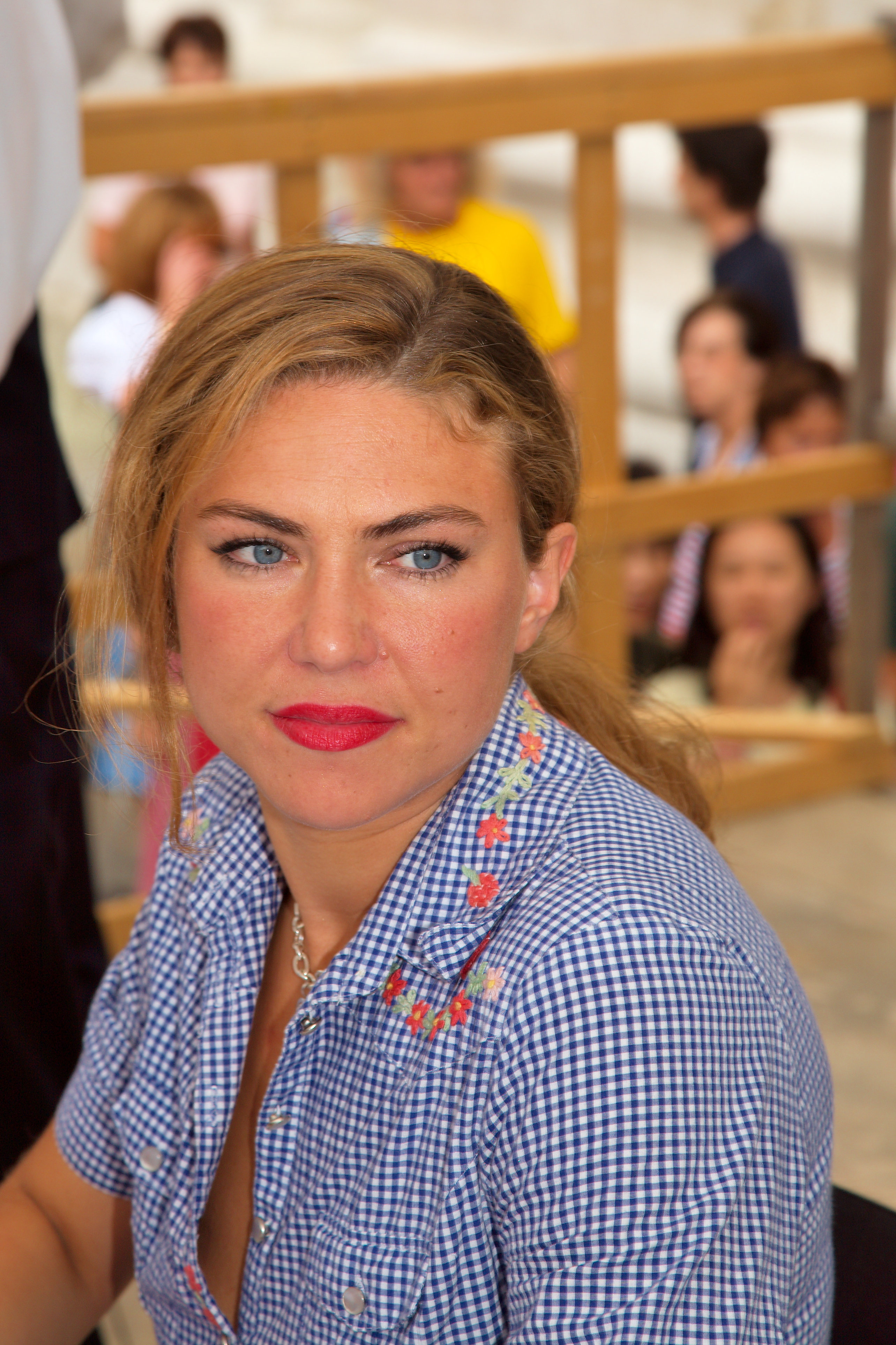
- Annette Dasch during the Salzburg Festival, 2008
- Born: 24 March 1976 (age 50); West Berlin, Germany
- Occupations: Opera singer; concert soloist
- Spouse: Daniel Schmutzhard (m. 2011)

Annette Dasch (born 24 March 1976) is a German soprano. She has performed in opera and concerts internationally, often portraying Mozart characters such as Elvira in Don Giovanni at La Scala, Aminta in Il re pastore at the Salzburg Festival, and Electra in Idomeneo at the reopening of the Cuvilliés Theatre in 2008. She made her debut at the Bayreuth Festival as Elsa in Lohengrin in 2010.

== Life and career ==
Born in West Berlin, Dasch studied voice at the Hochschule für Musik und Theater München with Josef Loibl.

She made her debut at the Bavarian State Opera as the Gänsemagd (Goose girl) in Humperdinck's Königskinder, at La Scala as Elvira in Mozart's Don Giovanni, at the Salzburg Festival 2006 as Aminta in his Il re pastore, staged and conducted by Thomas Hengelbrock, and at the Paris Opera as Antonia in Offenbach's The Tales of Hoffmann. Her performance of Schumann's Genoveva at the Hessisches Staatstheater Wiesbaden under Marc Piollet was recorded live in 2006. In 2007 she sang Elvira at the Berlin State Opera under Daniel Barenboim. She appeared in Salzburg in 2007 as Haydn's Armida, staged by Christof Loy, and in 2008 as Donna Anna in Don Giovanni. She appeared as Electra in Mozart's Idomeneo, staged by Dieter Dorn and conducted by Kent Nagano, in the reopening in June 2008 of the Cuvilliés Theatre where the opera had been first performed in 1781. Idomeneo was performed by John Mark Ainsley and Ilia by Juliane Banse. Her debut at the Metropolitan Opera in 2009 was the Countess in Mozart's The Marriage of Figaro, conducted by Fabio Luisi. Her debut at the Bayreuth Festival as Elsa in Wagner's Lohengrin, staged by Hans Neuenfels and conducted by Andris Nelsons, in the opening night 25 July 2010.

On the concert stage she appeared at the Maggio Musicale Fiorentino in Mendelssohn's Elijah with Seiji Ozawa. She sang in Schumann's Das Paradies und die Peri the Vienna Philharmonic conducted by Nikolaus Harnoncourt. With the Gächinger Kantorei and the New York Philharmonic under Helmuth Rilling she appeared in Avery Fisher Hall in Handel's Messiah in 2009.

In December 2014, she returned to the Metropolitan Opera in the role of Eva in Wagner's Die Meistersinger von Nürnberg.

Dasch is on the jury of the International Song Competition "Das Lied" chaired by Thomas Quasthoff. Composer Richard Beaudoin has dedicated two works to her.

She has a regular show called "Annette's Dasch-Salon" in Berlin, playing with the term "Waschsalon" (laundromat). Dasch voiced Madame de Garderobe in the German dubbing of the 2017 film Beauty and the Beast.

She replaced Anna Netrebko, who withdrew due to exhaustion, as Elsa in Lohengrin at the 2019 Bayreuth Festival. In 2025, she sung and acted Dschilli Bey in Eine Frau von Format, a "forgotten" operetta by Michael Krasznay-Krausz recreated in the Oper Köln.

=== Personal life ===
In 2011, Dasch married Austrian baritone Daniel Schmutzhard. They have two children, Fanny and Hans.

== Recordings ==
- Carl Orff: Carmina Burana – Gert Henning-Jensen, Zeljko Lucic, Orfeón Donostiarra, hr-Sinfonieorchester, conductor Hugh Wolff, Rheingau Musik Festival live in Eberbach Abbey, 2002
- Mozart: Il re pastore – Marlis Petersen, Krešimir Špicer, Arpiné Rahdjian, Andreas Karasiak, Balthasar-Neumann-Ensemble, conductor Thomas Hengelbrock, Deutsche Grammophon, DVD 2006
- Britten: War Requiem – James Taylor, Christian Gerhaher, Festivalensemble Stuttgart, conductor Helmuth Rilling, hänssler classic, September 2008
- Haydn: Die Schöpfung – Annette Dasch, Christoph Strehl, Thomas Quasthoff and Vienna Chamber Choir and Austro-Hungarian Haydn Orchestra conducted by Ádám Fischer, Euroarts DVD 2009
