= James Taylor (tenor) =

American tenor (born 1966)

- Born: 1966 (age 59–60); Dallas
- Education: Texas Christian University; Hochschule für Musik und Theater München
- Occupations: Classical tenor; Academic teacher
- Organization: Yale University

James Taylor (born 1966 in Dallas) is an American tenor, known for singing the Evangelist in works of Johann Sebastian Bach.

== Biography ==
James Taylor grew up in Houston. He studied singing with Arden Hopkin at the Texas Christian University. He continued his studies on a Fulbright scholarship at the Hochschule für Musik in Munich with Adalbert Kraus and Daphne Evangelatos.

He has internationally appeared in Bach's cantatas and oratorios. He recorded the Easter Oratorio in 1994 with the Collegium Vocale Gent and Philippe Herreweghe. With the Gächinger Kantorei and Helmuth Rilling he recorded the St John Passion in 1996, and the Christmas Oratorio in 2000. He sang in Bach's Mass in B minor in Bamberg with Sir Roger Norrington, and in Haydn's Orlando Paladino with Nikolaus Harnoncourt. In 2000 he performed the role of Neptune in the first modern revival of Giovanni Legrenzi's La divisione del mondo at the Schwetzingen Festival.

In Taylor's first appearance with the New York Philharmonic under Kurt Masur in Carnegie Hall in 2008 he was the Evangelist in the St Matthew Passion, singing with Matthias Goerne and Anna Larsson, among others. The review stated: "Above all, tying the story together, was James Taylor (no, not that James Taylor) as the Evangelist. Yes, his voice was radiant and resounding. More important was his dramatic turn of phrase, his moods from the extreme to the beatific, as he told – through a recitative which verged on aria – the story.".

His debut in Carnegie Hall was in 2005 the world premiere of the Levine completion of Mozart's Great Mass in C minor with the Carnegie Hall Festival Chorus and the Orchestra of St. Luke's conducted by Helmuth Rilling. He performed Franz Schmidt's The Book with Seven Seals with the Cleveland Orchestra.

In 2008 he recorded Britten's War Requiem with Annette Dasch, Christian Gerhaher and the Festivalensemble Stuttgart under Rilling. The concert was performed at the Rheingau Musik Festival, the Musikfest of the Internationale Bachakademie Stuttgart and at the Beethovenfest in Bonn.

In 2009 he appeared with the Gächinger Kantorei and the New York Philharmonic under Helmuth Rilling in Avery Fisher Hall in Handel's Messiah in 2009, reviewed in the New York Times: "The tenor James Taylor performed with conviction and plenty of bite. ".

Taylor has been a teacher at the Yale University from 2005.

== Selected recordings ==
- Bach: Easter Oratorio, Barbara Schlick, Kai Wessel, Peter Kooy, Collegium Vocale Gent, conductor Philippe Herreweghe, Harmonia Mundi France, 1994
- Bach: Johannes-Passion, Michael Schade, Matthias Goerne, Juliane Banse, Ingeborg Danz, Andreas Schmidt, Gächinger Kantorei, Bach-Collegium Stuttgart, Helmuth Rilling, Hänssler, 1996
- Haydn: Missa in Angustiis, Eva Lind, Ingeborg Danz, Reinhard Hagen, EuropaChorAkademie, SWR Symphony Orchestra, conductor: Michael Gielen, 1999
- Bach: Mass in B minor, Sibylla Rubens, Juliane Banse, Ingeborg Danz, Andreas Schmidt, Thomas Quasthoff, Gächinger Kantorei, Bach-Collegium Stuttgart, Helmuth Rilling, Hänssler, 1999 (#46 on bach-cantatas)
- Bach: Christmas Oratorio, Sibylla Rubens, Ingeborg Danz, Marcus Ullman, Hanno Müller-Brachmann, Gächinger Kantorei, Bach-Collegium Stuttgart, Helmuth Rilling, Hänssler, 2000 review
