= Paul Schweinester =

Austrian operatic tenor (born 1985)

Paul Schweinester (born 1985) is an Austrian operatic tenor.

== Career ==
Born in Innsbruck, early on Schweinester was able to gain professional experience as a soprano soloist with the Wilten Boys' Choir trained by Johannes Stecher, at the Tiroler Festspiele Erl, as Prince Yamadori in Madama Butterfly in Mumbai, at the Wiener Kammeroper and at the Vienna Festival as Romeo in an opera by Georg Anton Benda with new compositions by Ulrich Krah. From 2009 to 2013, Schweinester was a member of the ensemble Wiener Volksoper and performed there in musicals, revues, operettas and operas. Among others he was Freddy in My Fair Lady, the little boy in Hans Werner Henze's Wundertheater, Wenzel in The Bartered Bride and Pedrillo in Die Entführung aus dem Serail. He completed his studies at the University of Music and Performing Arts Vienna in 2012 with the Magister title.

In summer 2012, he belonged to the Young Singers Project of the Salzburg Festival and sang Monostatos in a production of The Magic Flute for children, as well as smaller roles in the big festival productions, Die Soldaten and La Bohème. In 2013 he played the bicycle messenger Josef Powolny in the world premiere of Friedrich Cerha's Onkel Präsident at the Staatstheater am Gärtnerplatz in Munich, whereupon he was im invited to sing in the opera Der Flaschengeist by Wilfried Hiller in the Philharmonie Gasteig in Munich.

In 2014 he started his international career as Brighella in Ariadne auf Naxos at the Royal Opera House Covent Garden in London, and twice as Pedrillo - in a concert performance in the Festspielhaus Baden-Baden and immediately afterwards in the new production of the Opéra Garnier in Paris. The German production included Diana Damrau and Rolando Villazón and was immediately published as a recording, the French one was staged by Zabou Breitman and conducted by Philippe Jordan. His debut at Milan's Scala and Don Basilio in a new production of Le nozze di Figaro at the Salzburg Festival followed in 2015. In 2016 he played Laertes at the Bregenz Festival in Franco Faccio's Amleto.

In the concert hall, Schweinester sings lieder by Franz Schubert, Felix Mendelssohn Bartholdy, Johannes Brahms and Benjamin Britten as well as numerous sacred works by Johann Sebastian Bach, Wolfgang Amadeus Mozart, Joseph and Michael Haydn. He sang Bach's Magnificat in Meran and Wörgl, Bach cantatas in Wiener Musikverein and the Christmas Oratorio in Wilden, Michael Haydn's Requiem in St. Stephen's Cathedral, Vienna, Rossini's Stabat mater in the Bregenzer Kornmarktkirche. With the song cycle Die schöne Müllerin, he also gave guest performances in the United States, with Haydn's The Seasons in Schloss Esterházy, with Mozart's Great Mass in C minor, K. 427 in Le Mans, Angers and Nantes. In Hamburg he gave a Schubert/Britten Lieder evening with Lech Napierala as pianist.

== Some recordings ==
- Bach: Christmas Oratorio. With Daniel Schmutzhard (bass), Paul Schweinester (tenor), Choir and soloists of the Wilten Boys Choir, Academia Jacobus Stainer. Conductor: Johannes Stecher. (Gramola, CD und DVD)
- Mozart: Die Entführung aus dem Serail. With Diana Damrau (Konstanze), Rolando Villazón (Belmonte), Thomas Quasthoff (Bassa Selim), Anna Prohaska (Blonde), Paul Schweinester (Pedrillo) and Franz-Josef Selig (Osmin). Conductor: Yannick Nézet-Séguin. A recording from the Festspielhaus Baden-Baden. (Deutsche Grammophon)
