= Boys' choir =

Choir of trebles and altos/mezzos that consists only of boys

A boys' choir is a choir made up of boys who have yet to begin (or are just in the early stages of) puberty and so retain their high-pitched childhood voice. Members are known as trebles ("boy sopranos") or meanes ("boy altos"), depending on their range. Boys' choirs of churches or cathedrals on both sides of the Atlantic may sing alongside and train with men, who provide the tenor and bass parts, in a tradition that dates back traceably to the 7th century, in the case of York Minster, and probably much further.

== Middle Ages and early development ==
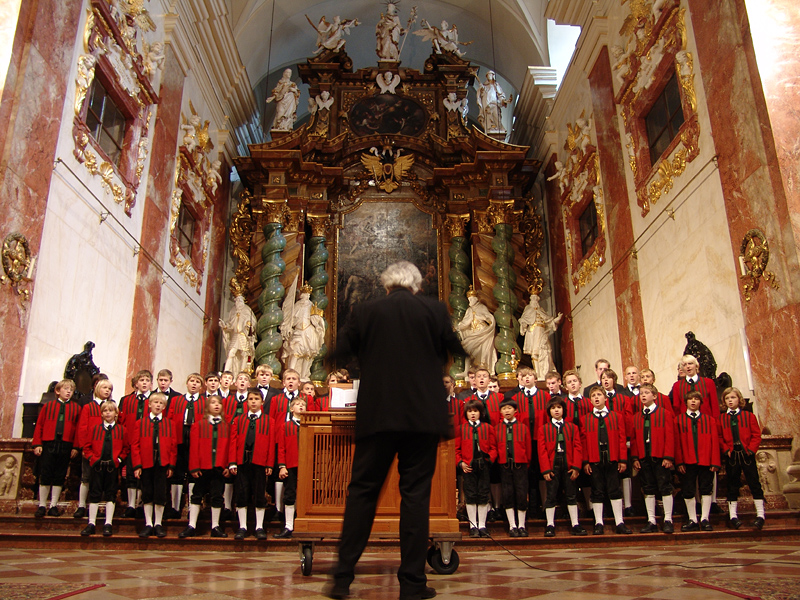
The Wilten Boys' Choir, one of the oldest boys' choirs. Six of its members formed, in the 15th century, the nucleus of the Vienna Boys' Choir as established by Maximilian I.

Boys' choirs in Western culture developed during the Middle Ages. Boys contributed the treble and meane lines in church music, women being barred from this role. The oldest existing boys' choirs, such as at York, at Regensburg (10th century), at Montserrat, at Westminster Abbey, and at the Vienna court, trace their roots back to this era.

About the Vienna Boys' Choir: in 1498 … Emperor Maximilian I moved his court and his court musicians from Innsbruck to Vienna. He gave specific instructions that there were to be six boys among his musicians. For want of a foundation charter, historians have settled on 1498 as the official foundation date of the Vienna Hofmusikkapelle and—in consequence—the Vienna Boys' Choir. Until 1918, the choir sang exclusively for the court, at mass, at private concerts and functions and on state occasions.

== 20th century ==
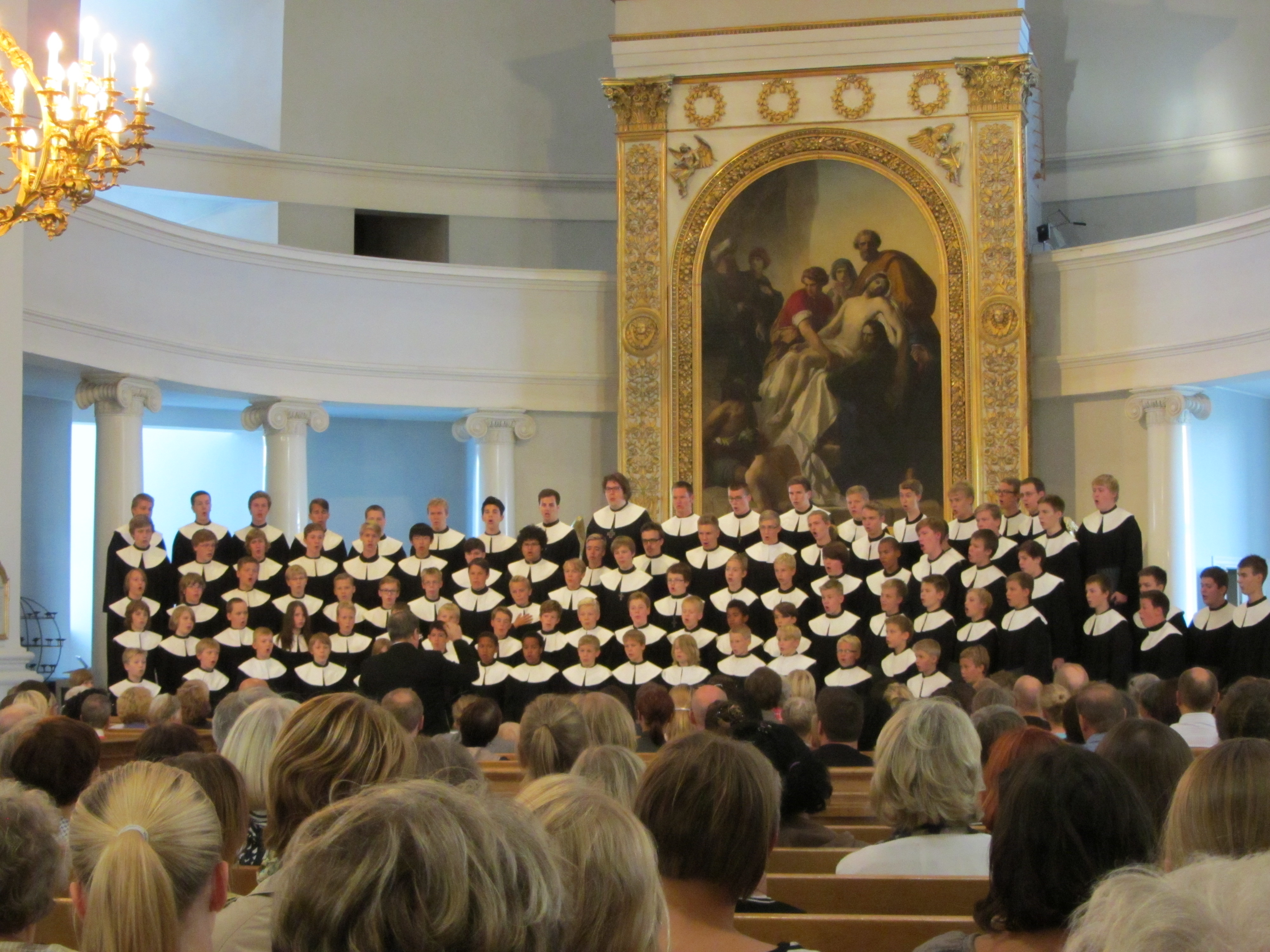
Cantores Minores performing in the Helsinki Cathedral in 2013

Today, church traditions with strong roots in the Middle Ages (in particular, Anglican, Catholic, Orthodox and Lutheran churches) continue to host many boys' choirs. The Anglican church is particularly well known for its contributions to choral works and arrangements for boys' voices. However, the general inclusion of female voices in church music since the mid-1800s has significantly reduced the importance of boys' choirs as church institutions. Many present boys' choirs were either founded or reconstituted during the first half of the 20th century as independent concert choirs. In 1917 an article in The Musical Quarterly identified - and criticized - a trend toward the foundation of many boys' choirs in the US, which the author derided as the "boy choir fad."

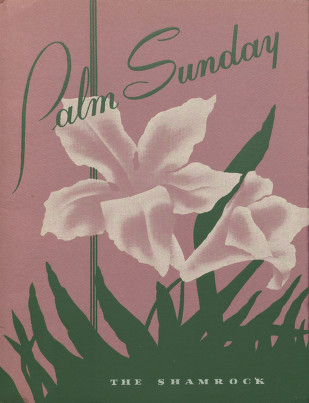
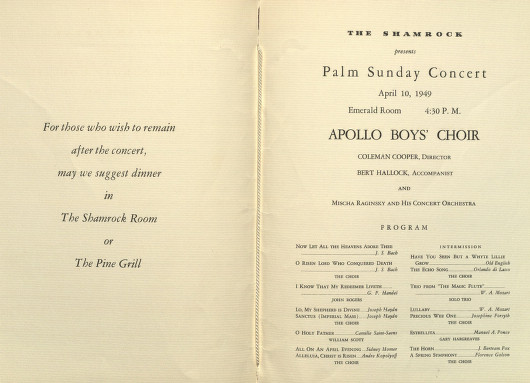
Palm Sunday Concert Program, Apollo Boys' Choir, The Shamrock Hotel, Houston, Texas (April 10, 1949)

== Contemporary developments ==
The age of onset of puberty has declined to the early teens, so boys' choirs can no longer expect to retain a majority of their singers through the age of 16 or 17—as was the case when Bach wrote complex cantatas for the male treble. Boys' voices now break, on average, by the age of 13.5, leading to higher choir turnover rates and limiting the complexity of a choir's musical repertoire. In addition to these challenges, there have been instances of sexual misconduct in some choirs and choir schools.

Boys' choirs offer young males an active point of entrance into music and vocal training. They can also help to foster discipline, high standards and cultural awareness, as well as providing strong peer groups oriented around boys who identify themselves with a choir's cultural and ethical values. A greater awareness of the value of gender-specific youth work may also support the positive contributions of boys choirs.

Many choirs also provide choir alumni with extensive opportunities—often coupled with continued vocal coaching—to support their vocal transition to altos, tenors and basses and to stimulate their continued artistic development.

== Notes and references ==
- Koopman, Ton (1996). "Recording Bach's Early Cantatas". Early Music. 24 (4): 605–621. doi:10.1093/earlyj/XXIV.4.605. JSTOR 3128058.
