= Ádám Jávorkai =

Hungarian cellist

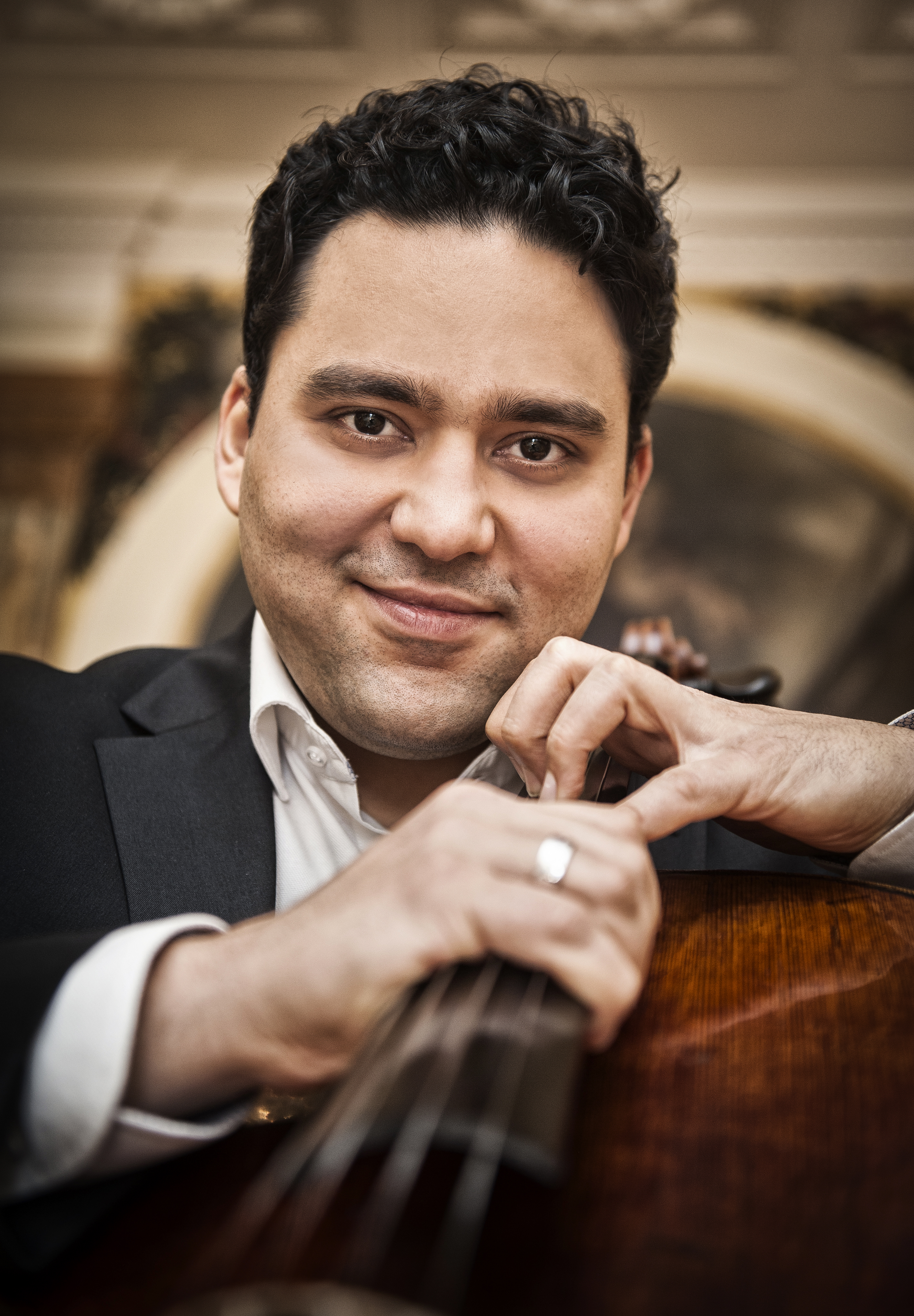
Adam Javorkai cello soloist

Ádám Jávorkai is a Hungarian cellist, currently living in Vienna.

== Biography ==
Javorkai attended the Hans Richter Conservatoire in his native city and the Béla Bartók Conservatoire in Budapest, which he completed with distinction. From 1996 to 2004, he studied in the classes of Prof. Angelica May and Prof. Reinhard Latzko at the University of Music and the Performing Arts in Vienna. He completed his M.A. with unanimous distinction. Currently, he is pursuing a doctorate in musicology in Vienna. For further perfection, he has attended master classes held by Miklós Perényi, Ina-Esther Joost, Tobias Kühne, Ferenc Rados and Anner Bijlsma.

From 2001 to 2003, Javorkai was a scholarship-holder of the Annie Fischer Foundation in Budapest, in 2002 he received a scholarship from the Herbert von Karajan Centre in Vienna and scholarships from the Nippon Foundation, Tokyo, in 2003 and 2004. Adam Javorkai regularly holds master classes in different countries, e.g. at the Asahikawa International String Seminar in Japan, at the Orpheus Academy in Plovdiv, Bulgaria, at the Judenburg Summer in Austria, at the Music University in Bogota, Colombia, and at the Kodály Society in Wales.

As a soloist, Adam Javorkai regularly appears with the Budapest Philharmonic, the Philharmonia Györ, the North Hungarian Philharmonic Orchestra, the Youth Symphony Orchestra in Genoa, the Sinfonietta Baden, the Savaria Symphony Orchestra, the Szeged Symphony Orchestra, the Sofia Soloists, the Orchestra of the Arena di Verona and other orchestras as well as with the concert organizer National Philharmonia Budapest.

He has made many recordings for international radio and television stations (including for the Austrian classical channel Ö1 and Radio Stephansdom and for the Hungarian Radio Bartók). He has also collaborated in ORF and ATV television productions.

Javorkai was a representative of Austria at the International Jeunesse Festival in Brussels in 2005and at the EU Music Festival in Warsaw on the occasion of the EU’s eastward expansion. In 2003, he followed an invitation from the Tokyo Foundation and took part in the Sylff Africa/Europe Regional Forum in Cairo in 2003 as a representative of Vienna Music University.

Javorkai has held concerts in Tokyo Opera City, the ‘Forbidden City’, Beijing, the Suntory Hall, Tokyo, the Arts Center in Seoul, the Vienna Musikverein, the Vienna Konzerthaus, the Berlin Konzerthaus, at the Schleswig-Holstein Festival, in the New Philharmonia in Luxembourg, at the ‘Settimane musicali al Teatro Olimpico’ in Vicenza, at the Chopin Festival in Gaming, at the Liszt Academy in Budapest, in the Museum of Fine Arts in Budapest and many other places.

Concert tours have also taken him to the Czech Republic, Hungary, Oman, Colombia, Austria, the UK, Belgium, Denmark, Kosovo, France, Turkey, Japan, Korea, Norway, Egypt, Germany, Spain, China, Siberia, Italy, Israel, Luxembourg, the Netherlands, Poland, Greece and Russia. In 2014, in recognition of his work against discrimination and for international understanding he was awarded an Honorary Membership of the Raoul Wallenberg Foundation by Baruch Tenembaum.

Javorkai frequently performs with his brother, violinist Sandor Javorkai and with his fiancé, the Dutch concert pianist Clara Biermasz. Besides he is a member of the Mozarthaus Vienna String Quartet and the Huberman String Trio.

== Awards ==
Jávorkai has ended many competitions with honours. As a pianist Javorkai was prize-winner at the National Piano Competition in Hungary in 1990 and was awarded a Franz Liszt Medal of Honour in 1991. As a cellist, he won the Hungarian Emil Vajda Stringed Instruments Competition for three years in succession after 1991 and the first prize of the National Cello Competition in Hungary in 1990, 1993 and 1996. 1998: Bohuslav Martinu Prize of the International Summer Academy Prague-Vienna-Budapest; 2000: Appreciation Prizes ‘Cellist of the Year’ and ‘Best Interpreter of Slovenian Compositions’, awarded by the Association of Slovenian Composers; 2002: Bartók Prize, Semmering, Austria; 2003: Kodály Prize for the duo with Sándor Jávorkai, Austria; 2008: in a duo with Clara Biermasz first prize at the international competition ‘Premio Città di Padova’, Italy, category chamber music, and at the same place awarded the ‘Primo Premio assoluto’ together with Clara Biermasz as the overall winners of all categories; the same year, first prize at ‘Soloist and Orchestra’, Italy. In 2009, Sándor and Adam Jávorkai were together honoured as ‘Artist of the Year’ by Jeunesse and Bank Austria.

In 2014, in recognition of his work against discrimination and for international understanding he was awarded an Honorary Membership of the Raoul Wallenberg Foundation by Baruch Tenembaum.

== Press reviews ==
"Two exceptional talents with brilliant technical and refined interpretative skills" (Padova Cultura on the Duo Adam Javorkai & Clara Biermasz, 2008)

"Kammermusik at its best" (Wiener Zeitung on the Duo Adam Javorkai & Clara Biermasz 2014)

== Discography ==
- 2002: P.I.Tchaikovsky: Rococo Variations Op. 33 (Harmónia, HCD 222)
- 2009: A. Dvořák: Concerto for Cello op. 104 (Gramola 98865)
- 2010: Once Upon A Time In America (ALES 5031)
- 2011: B. Bartók, Z. Kodály: Duos for Violin and Cello (Gramola 98916).
- 2013: W.A. Mozart: String Quartets (Gramola 99000)
- 2014: J. Brahms, E. Grieg: Cello Sonatas (Gramola 99034)
