= Daniel Schmutzhard =

Austrian operatic baritone (born 1982)

Daniel Schmutzhard (born 1982) is an Austrian operatic baritone.

== Life ==
Born in Aldrans, Schmutzhard was a boy soloist with the Wilten Boys' Choir under Johannes Stecher and studied while still at school at the Tiroler Landeskonservatorium. He continued his studies at the University of Music and Performing Arts Vienna with Ralf Döring.

From 2005 to 2011 he was a member of the ensemble at the Volksoper Wien and from 2011 to 2018 at the Oper Frankfurt. At the same time he was a guest at the Bregenzer Festspiele, the Theater an der Wien, the Berlin State Opera, the Paris Opera and the Komische Oper Berlin.

Since the 2018/19 season, he has been working freelance.

He has been married to the opera singer Annette Dasch since 2011 and has two children.

== Recording ==
- Bach: Christmas Oratorio, with Paul Schweinester as the Evangelist, Choir and soloists of the Wilten Boys' Choir, Academia Jacobus Stainer. Conductor: Johannes Stecher. (Gramola, CD and DVD)
