= Elena Denisova =

Elena Denisova Елена Денисова
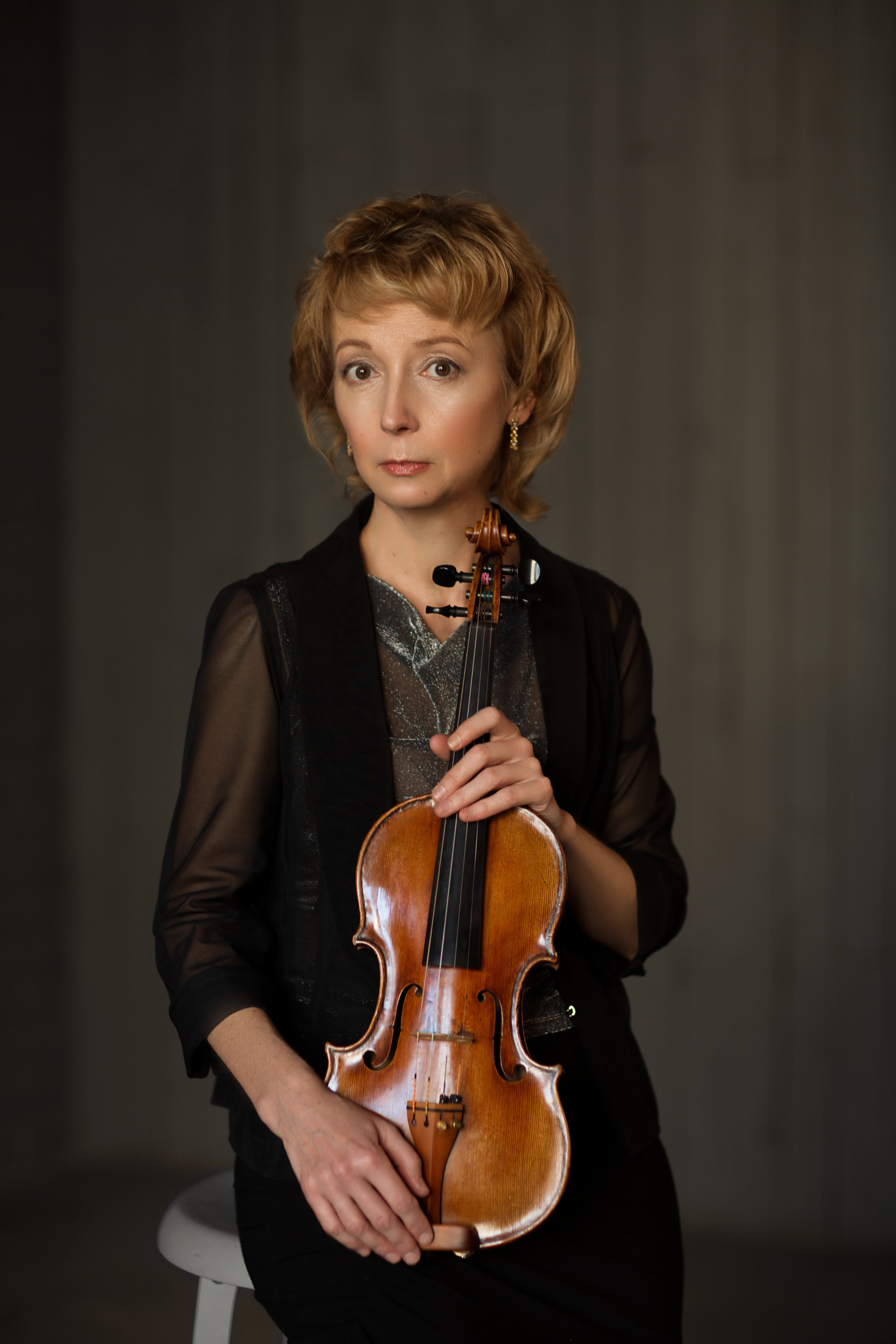
- Elena Denisova in 2017

Background information
- Born: February 14, 1963 (age 63); Moscow
- Occupation: Festival director
- Instrument: Violin

Elena Denisova (Елена Денисова; born February 14, 1963, in Moscow) is a Russian violinist and festival director. She emigrated to Austria and has been an Austrian citizen since 1992.

== Life ==
The musical career of Denisova started at the age of four. The daughter of a geological scientist and a housewife attended the music school at Moscow Conservatory after which she went to the Moscow P.I. Tchaikovsky Conservatory. At the age of eleven she appeared in her first CD recording. After her studies with the violin virtuosos and David Oistrach pupils Valery Klimov and Oleg Kagan followed a soloist engagement at the Moscow State Philharmonic. Afterwards she moved to Austria in the year 1990 where she worked at the Stadttheater Klagenfurt and the festival "Carinthian Summer".

Denisova is the founder of the Moscow National Quartet and the co-founder of the chamber orchestra "Collegium Musicum Carinthia". Together with the conductor and pianist Alexei Kornienko she founded the Gustav-Mahler-Ensemble, which among others performs at the annual "Woerthersee Classic Festival". Elena Denisova represents this festival as a director. Ultimately she functions as chairwoman of the 2001 founded association "Classic Etcetera".

Simultaneously to these commitments Denisova embraces many concerts, festivals and international tours as a soloist. Among others she performed at the "Flanders Festival", the Viennese festivals "Hoergaenge" and "Klangbogen", the "Ljubljana Festival", the "Russian Winter Festival" in Moscow, the Beethovenfest in Bonn, the "Austrian Musical Weeks" in Bulgaria as well as the "Concerti di Primavere" in Parma. The German composer Franz Hummel certified Denisova a great affluence of nuances, easiness and expressive power.

Eventually Denisova engaged in the promotion of young artists, for example at the Austro-American Institute in Vienna as well as a jury member at international competitions. She also cooperates with different companies, contributing her part at developing innovative strings. The improvement of none-conventional possibilities of interpretation has a crucial significance for her in respect to which her interpretation of Vivaldis "Four Seasons" attracted a lot of attention: Denisova played each season on a different violin from Cremona. Within the scope of this chamber musical recording two Stradivari, one Francesco Ruggeri and one Guarneri del Gesù were deployed. The instruments were provided by Oesterreichische Nationalbank and have a total value of 7.2 million euros.

== Awards (extract) ==
- 1976: Concertino Praha, Prague
- 1985: International Violin Contest, Zagreb
- 1987: International Violin Contest, Markneukirchen

== Discography (extract) ==
- Natural Flow: Yavor Dimitrov, David L. Kaplan, Paul Walter Fürst and Monte K. Pishny-Floyd (ORF)
- Erwachen der Liebe: Boudewijn Buckinx, Philipp Schober (Assam Media Verlag)
- Joseph Haydn violin sonatas: Elena Denisova, Alexei Kornienko (Gramola)
- Antonio Vivaldi Le Quattro Stagioni: Elena Denisova, Gustav Mahler Ensemble (Assam Media Verlag)
- Vienna 1900 – Fuchs, Singer, Zemlinsky: Elena Denisova, Alexei Kornienko (Gramola)
- Max Reger violin concerto A-major op.101: Elena Denisova, Collegium Musicum Carinthia, Alexei Kornienko (ORF)
- Jascha Heifetz – Miniatures for violin and piano: Elena Denisova, Alexei Kornienko (Gramola)
- Bernhard Paumgartner: Elena Denisova, Grigori Alumjan, Alexei Kornienko (Gramola)
- Joseph Rheinberger: Pieces for violin and organ (Arte Nova)
- J.S.Bach; M.Kollontay: Partitas (Etcetera)
