= Georges-Louis Arlaud =

French photographer

Signature of Georges-Louis Arlaud.

Georges-Louis Arlaud (1869–1944) was a French photographer. He was assassinated during World War II.

== Biography ==
It was after taking over the family ceramics business that he became interested in photography as a way of keeping track of the pieces sold. On the advice of his friend, Swiss photographer Frédéric Boissonnas, he subsequently took over a studio in Lyon at 3 Place Meissonier (in the 1st arrondissement), which soon became a kind of social salon for the city's artists and bourgeoisie. Particularly attracted to nature, in 1925 he contributed to the illustration of a series of eighteen monthly booklets entitled Le Visage de la France (The Face of France).

At the same time, he became interested in nude painting and often placed his models in the middle of landscapes, particularly mountains. Twenty Studies of Nudes in the Open Air, published by Horos in 1920, was a great success at the time and remains highly sought after by art lovers today. The album of women published in 1936 was equally successful.

He was decorated with the Order of the Francisque. He moved back to La Ciotat in 1942, where he met a tragic end in 1944, shortly after the liberation of the town. His body was found in a cove after he had been murdered, his villa ransacked, and his work scattered.

His works have been in the public domain since January 1, 2015.

== Gallery ==
=== France ===
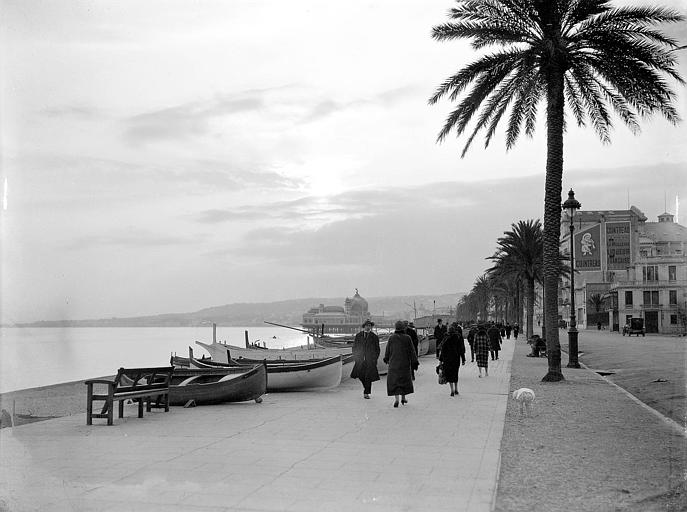
Coucher de soleil sur la Promenade des Anglais. Photo took in Nice, France.

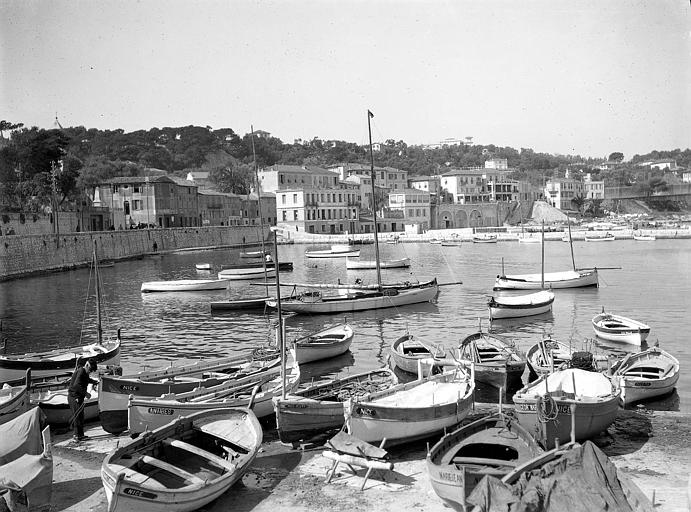
Port : bateaux de pêche à quai, Photo took in Saint-Jean-Cap-Ferrat, France

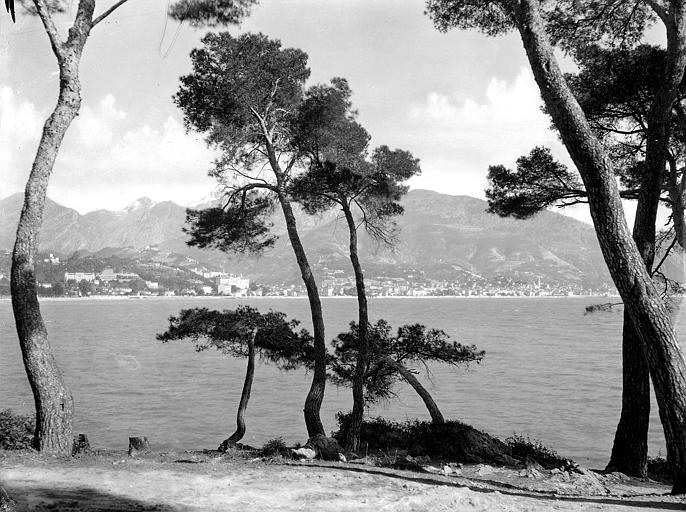
Menton vu du Cap-Martin

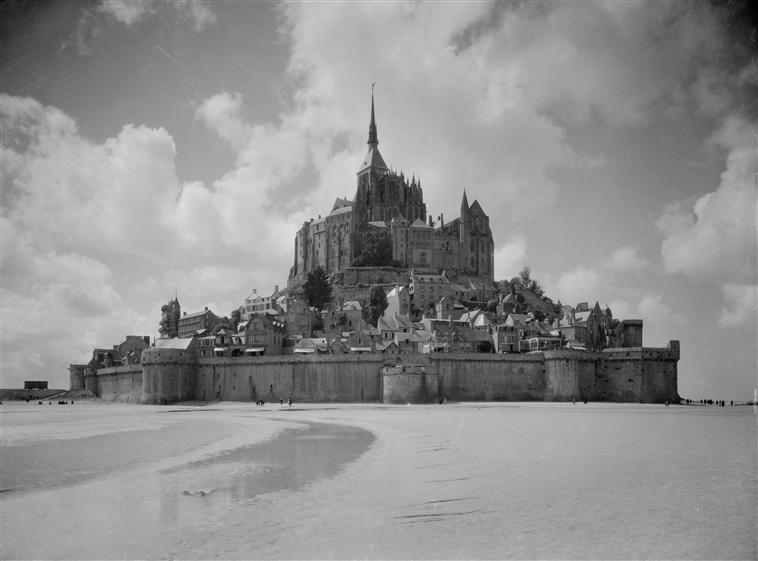
Mont Saint-Michel

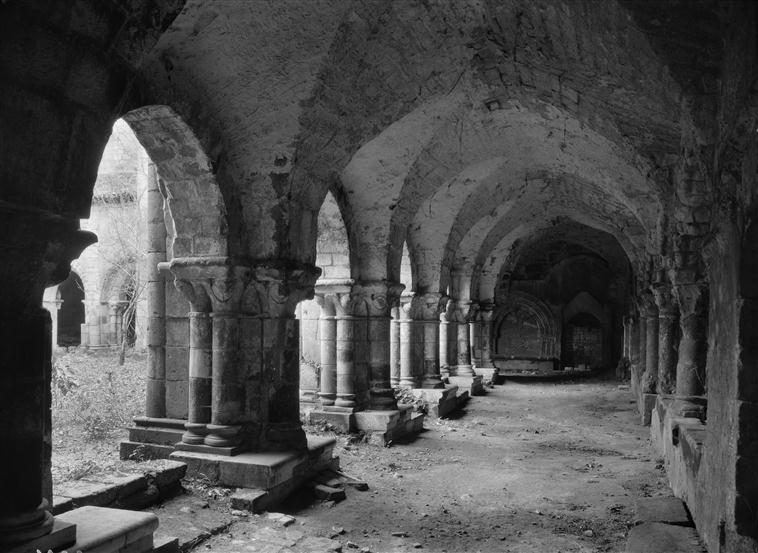
Cloître de l'abbaye de Nieul-sur-l'Autise en Vendée

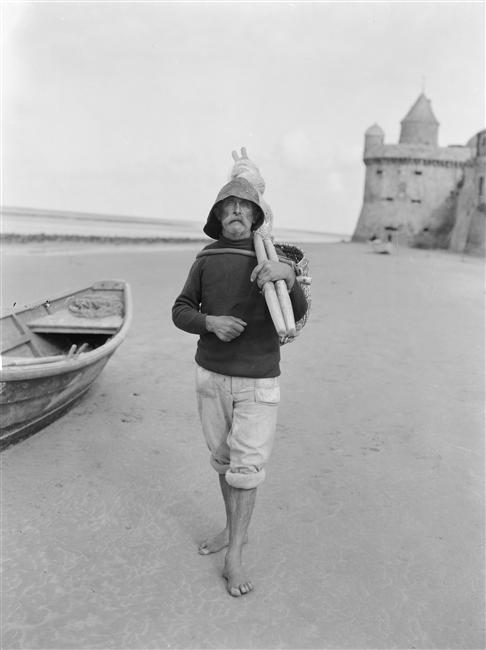
Pêcheur du Mont-Saint-Michel

=== Algeria ===
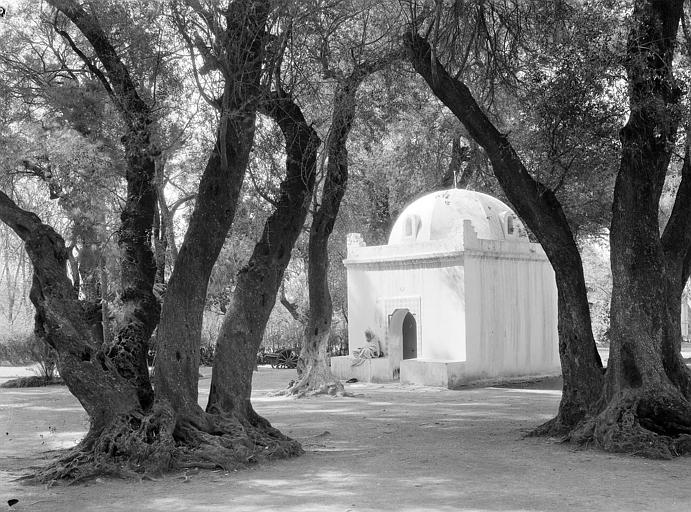
Le bois sacré

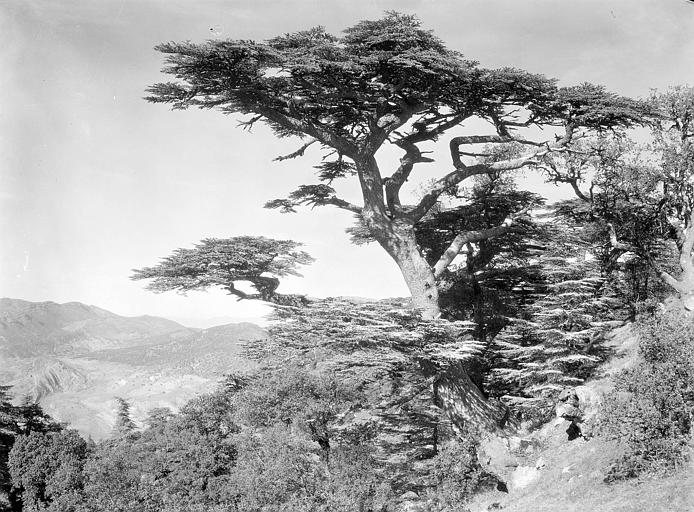
Cèdres centenaires

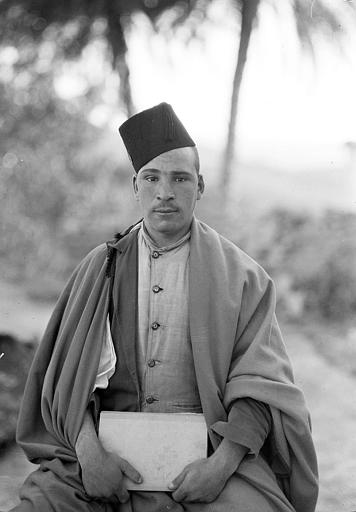
Le fils du Cheikh Abderammane

=== Nude ===
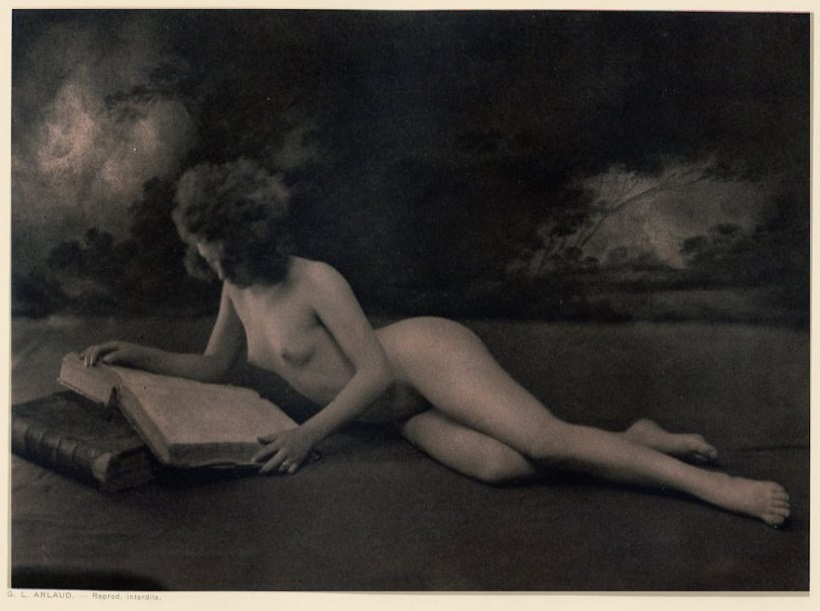
La Liseuse

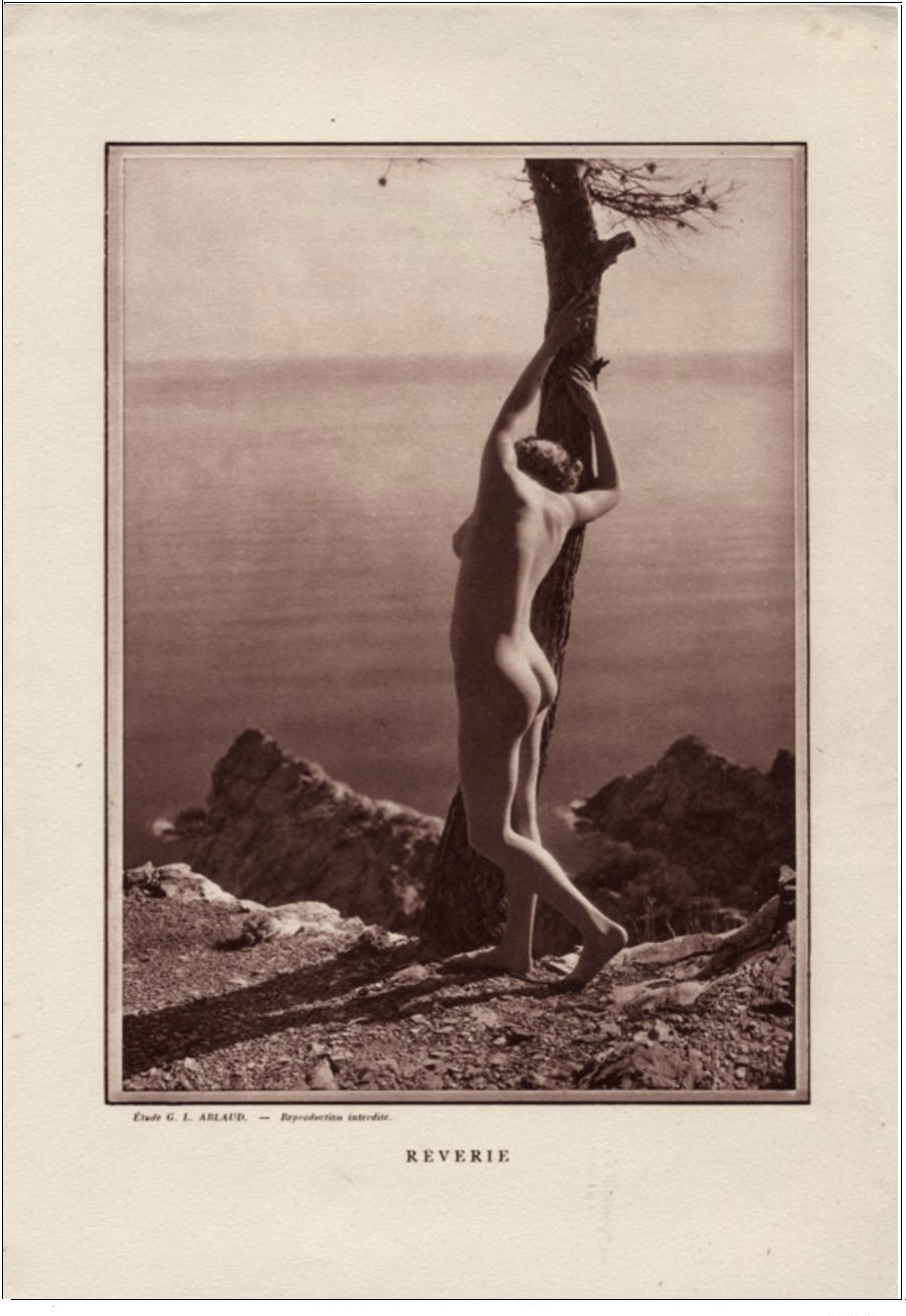
Rêverie

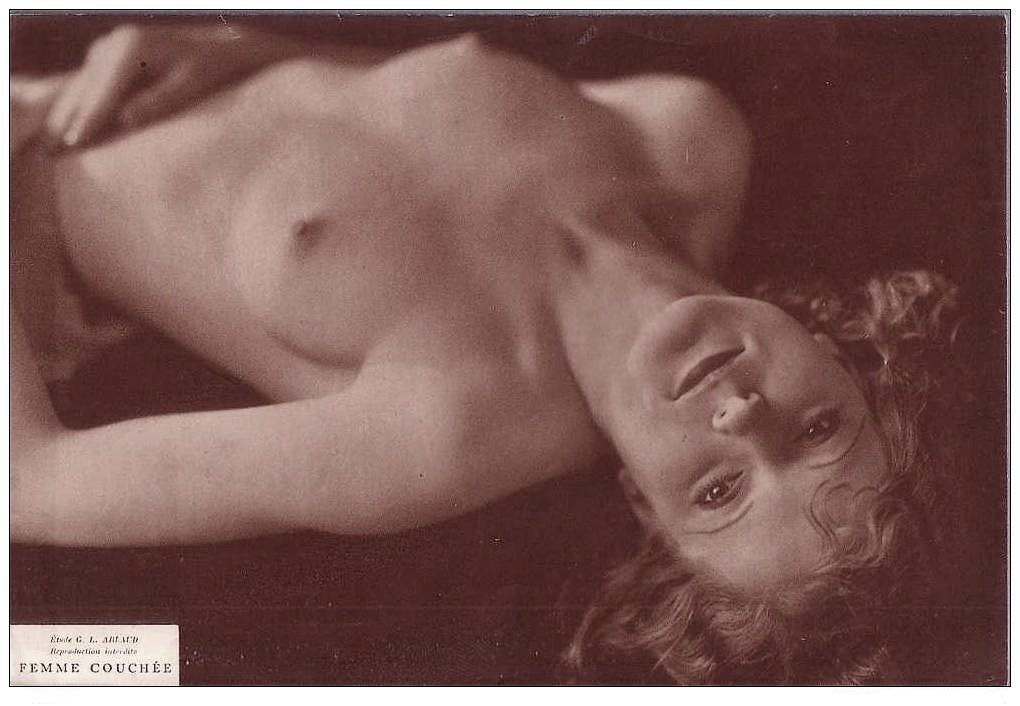
Femme couchée
