= Krämerspiegel =

1921 song cycle by Richard Strauss

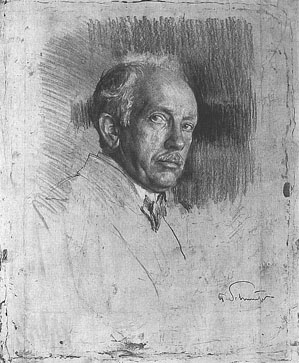
Schmutzer's engraved portrait of Strauss, 1922

Krämerspiegel (Shopkeeper's Mirror), Op. 66, is a 1921 song cycle of 12 songs written by Richard Strauss. The songs were set to texts commissioned by Strauss in a piqued response to a contractual obligation to produce a set of songs for his publisher. The texts were provided by Berlin literary critic Alfred Kerr, who wrote for Strauss a set of acidic verses ridiculing the music publishing business and containing in-jokes attacking some of Strauss' enemies such as Bote & Bock. The list of titles is:

1. "Es war einmal ein Bock"
2. "Einst kam der Bock als Bote"
3. "Es liebte einst ein Hase"
4. "Drei Masken sah ich am Himmel stehn"
5. "Hast du ein Tongedicht vollbracht"
6. "O lieber Künstler sei ermahnt"
7. "Unser Feind ist, großer Gott"
8. "Von Händlern wird die Kunst bedroht"
9. "Es war mal eine Wanze"
10. "Die Künstler sind die Schöpfer"
11. "Die Händler und die Macher"
12. "O Schröpferschwarm, o Händlerkreis"

The cycle has been recorded several times.
