= Philippe Arlaud =

French stage director

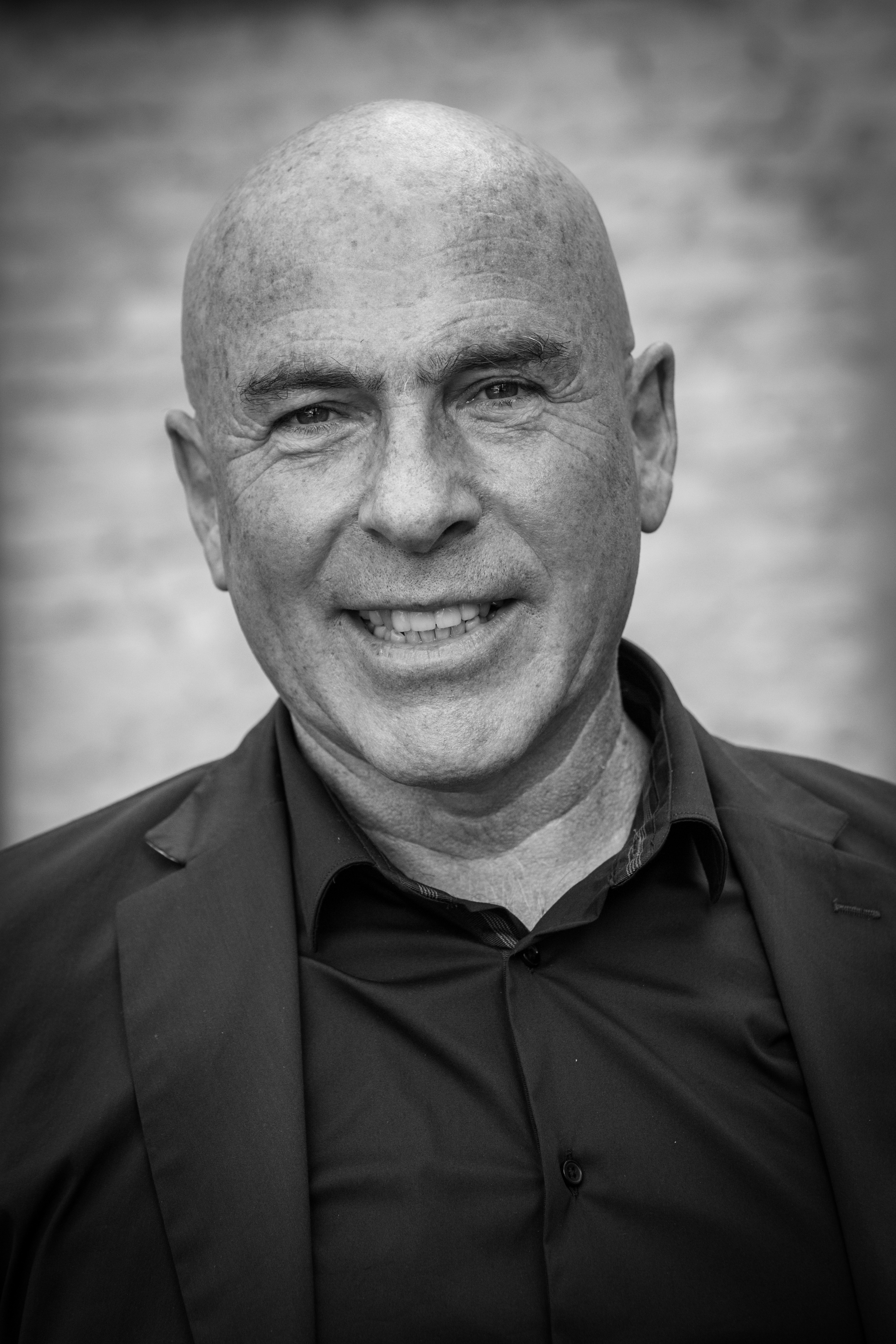
Arlaud in 2014

Philippe Arlaud, born in Paris, is a French stage director for plays, show, musical and opera, and is also a stage designer and light designer.

== Selected productions as director ==
- 1995 The Turn of the Screw, Wiener Kammeroper
- 1998 Nacht by Georg Friedrich Haas (premiere), Bregenzer Festspiele
- 1998 Die Frau ohne Schatten, Deutsche Oper Berlin
- 2002 Tannhäuser, Bayreuth Festival
- 2009 Les mamelles de Tirésias, Feldkirchfestival
- 2010 L'histoire du soldat, Feldkirchfestival
- 2010 Carmen, Festspielhaus Baden-Baden
- 2012 Ariadne auf Naxos, Festspielhaus Baden-Baden
- 2012 Fröken Julie by Ilkka Kuusisto, Feldkirchfestival

== Awards ==
- 1995 Kainz-Medaille for stage design, for Angels in America and In den Augen eines Fremden (Schauspielhaus Wien)
- 1996 Kainz-Medaille, for Quai West (Schauspielhaus Wien)
