= Wilten Boys' Choir =

Wilten Boys' Choir Wiltener Sängerknaben
- Choir
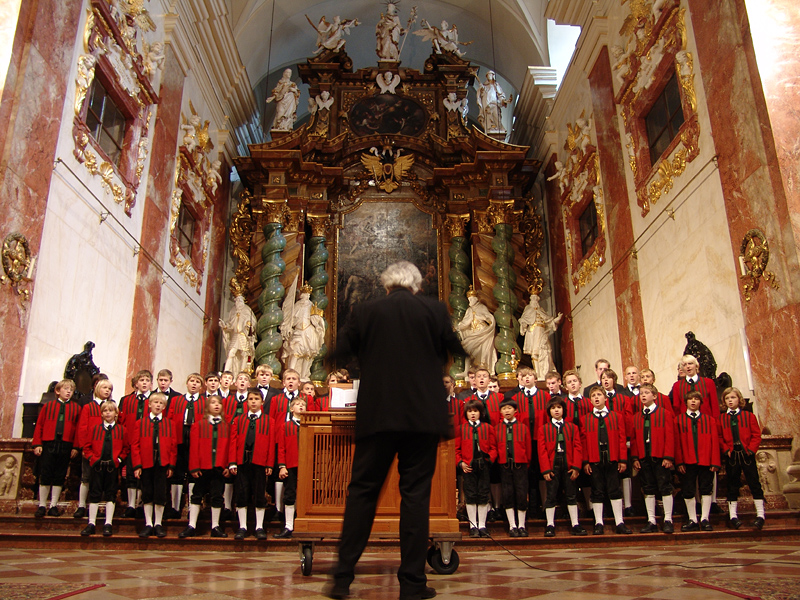
- Wilten Boys' Choir in the St. Roch's Church, Vienna, 2008
- Origin: Wilten, Austria
- Founded: 13th-century
- Music director: Johannes Stecher
- Headquarters: Wilten Abbey
- Website: www.saengerknaben.com

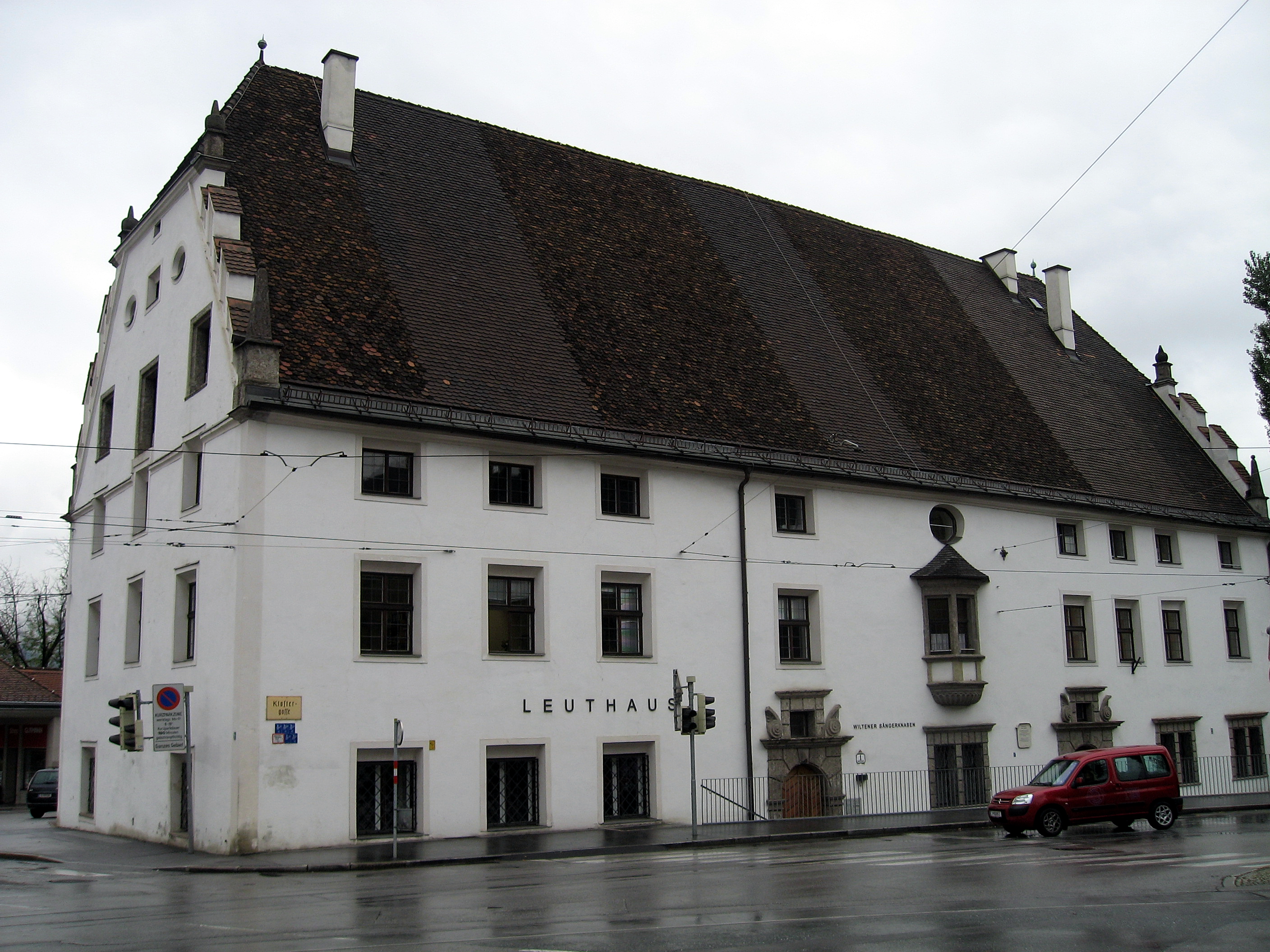
Leuthaus near Wilten Abbey, the choir's home

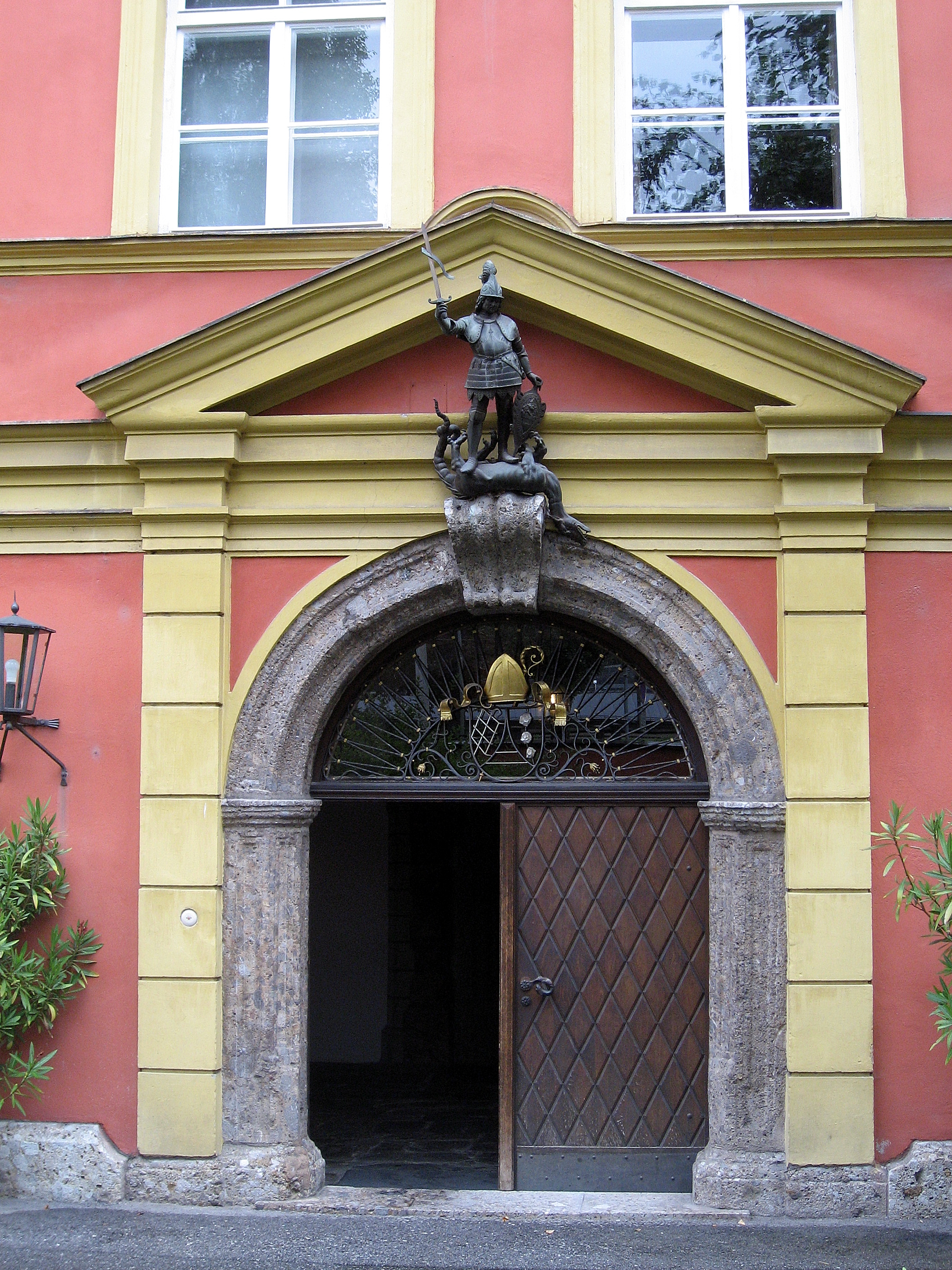
Portal of Wilten Abbey

The Wilten Boys' Choir (German: Wiltener Sängerknaben) is a part of the Premonstratensian Wilten Abbey, at the foot of Bergisel in Innsbruck, Austria. Founded in the mid-13th century, it is one of the oldest boys' choirs in Europe.

== History ==
The choir shares a common history with the Vienna Boys' Choir. According to contemporary sources, Emperor Maximilian I in 1498 established a court orchestra at Hofburg Palace in Vienna, including a choir which largely consisted of boys descending from Wilten in the County of Tyrol.

In 1946, the Wilten Boys' Choir was reestablished by Norbert Gerhold.

== Education ==
The choir currently consists of about 150 members, the youngest of which are about 6 years old. Following the change of voice, the boys can join the male voices and stay in the choir. The "concert choir" of the Wilten Boys' Choir is a special division of the Tiroler Landeskonservatorium.

Since 1991, Johannes Stecher is the choir's artistic director. Martin Pleyer and Vinzenz Arnold are in charge of organizational matters.

== Repertoire ==
The choir's repertoire includes a wide range, from sacred music to traditional alpine folk songs and opera.

During many concert tours, they have performed in Switzerland, Germany, Italy, France, Great Britain, Denmark, Romania, Israel and Japan.
